= Nevada Department of Cultural Affairs =

State agency in Nevada, United States

The Nevada Department of Cultural Affairs (DCA) was a governmental agency in the U.S. state of Nevada.

The Department of Cultural Affairs headquarters was located in Carson City, Nevada.

== History ==
The Department of Museums, Library, and Arts was created in 1993. In 2001, it was renamed as the Department of Cultural Affairs.

The Department was eliminated by the legislature for budgetary reasons in 2011, and its components were moved to other departments. The Nevada Arts Council and the Division of Museums and History were moved into the newly established Department of Tourism and Cultural Affairs, while the Nevada State Library and Archives was moved to the Department of Administration, and the Nevada State Historic Preservation Office became part of the Department of Conservation and Natural Resources.

== Division of Museums and History ==
The Division of Museums and History operates 6 facilities with one in development.

- East Ely Railroad Depot
- Lost City Museum, Overton
- Nevada Historical Society, Reno
- Nevada State Museum, Las Vegas
- Nevada State Museum, Carson City
- Nevada State Railroad Museum, Carson City
- Nevada State Railroad Museum, Boulder City
