= Nevada State Museum =

Nevada State Museum may refer to:

- Nevada State Museum, Carson City
- Nevada State Museum, Las Vegas
