= Lake Shore Electric Railway (disambiguation) =

Lake Shore Electric Railway is an interurban railway that ran between Cleveland and Toledo, Ohio.

Lake Shore Electric Railway may also refer to:

- Lake Shore Electric Railway (museum) in Ohio 2005–2009
- Lake Shore Electric Railway (California) in Elsinore, a California street railroad
