= Wing Park Golf Course =

- U.S. National Register of Historic Places
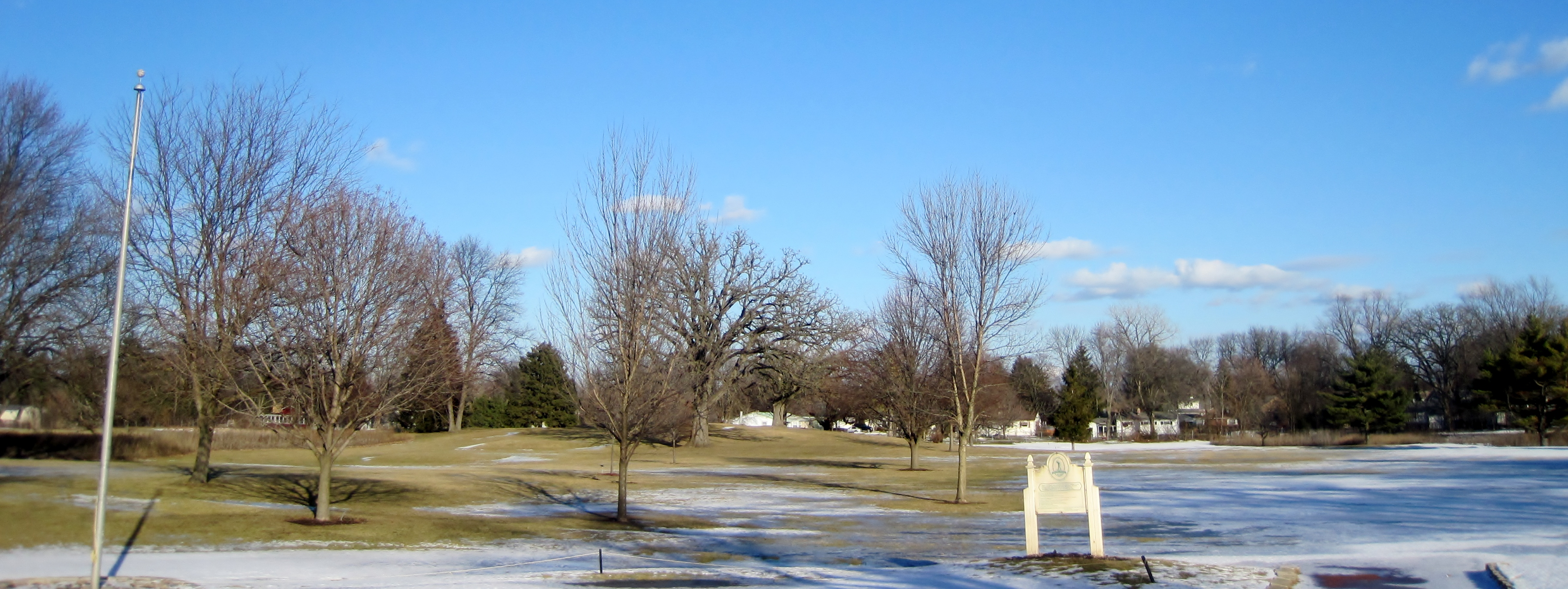

- Location within Illinois
- Location: 1000 Wing St., Elgin, Illinois
- Coordinates: 42°2′51″N 88°18′17″W
- Area: 52 acres (210,000 m^{2})
- Built: 1908
- NRHP reference No.: 09000027
- Added to NRHP: February 18, 2009

Wing Park Golf Course in Elgin, Illinois, is the "oldest and best preserved nine-hole municipal golf course in Illinois." The course was constructed during a golf course boom in the Chicago area during first few years of the 1900s. The course was named after William H. Wing, who donated the land for a park in 1902. When the Elgin and Belvidere Electric Company was built only a few blocks away, Elgin developed the southern portion of the property to a golf course. The course was developed by Tom Bendelow, a prolific designer who laid out over six hundred golf courses. Wing Park Golf Course opened on September 5, 1908, and has been in continuous operation since. The Wing Park Golf Club was organized in 1912 to help manage the property. The course was listed on the National Register of Historic Places in 2009.

== History ==
Golf is a sport that was brought to America by Scottish immigrants in the 1890s. It was immediately recognized as a sport of the wealthy, and moguls such as William Kissam Vanderbilt built their own courses. Charles B. Macdonald was a stockbroker who learned the sport while he attended school at the University of St Andrews in Scotland. Macdonald built the first golf course, the Onwentsia Club, in the Chicago area in Lake Forest in 1892. A year later, he built the Chicago Golf Club, the nation's first 18-hole golf course. The Chicago Golf Club was a great success, and prompted the construction of several new courses; by 1900, Chicago and its suburbs boasted twenty-six courses. Golf became a sport not only for the wealthy, but also for the public. In 1895, New York City opened a course at Van Cortlandt Park, the nation's first municipal course. Chicago followed suit in 1899, opening Jackson Park Golf Club to the public.

Elgin was founded in 1830s and became an important manufacturing town after the Galena and Chicago Union Railroad reached it in 1850. The Elgin National Watch Company and Gail Borden Condensed Milk factories dramatically increased the local population by providing jobs. Decreasing work hours at the turn of the century resulted in more recreational time for employees. The first golf course in Elgin was the nine-hole Elgin Country Club in 1901, a private course designed by Tom Bendelow west of the city. Bendelow designed over 600 golf courses in his career. He was a strong advocate for public golf courses, and taught course design at the college level.

Wing Park was named for William H. Wing, a descendent of the Wing family who moved to Elgin in 1846. Wing was a successful attorney and donated 121.5 acres (49.2 ha) of this estate to Elgin for use as a public park in 1902. The park officially opened to the public on August 2, 1903, and was split between land that had been used for farming and land that was covered in native woods. The park remained relatively undeveloped until 1907, when the Elgin and Belvidere Electric Company extended to State Street, four blocks east of the park. Among this plan was the construction of the Wing Park Golf Course. Elgin hired Bendelow, who staked the Wing Park course in only one day, and the course was built in two months at a cost of $1,250. The course was simple, but was primarily intended to be playable to beginning golfers. The course featured parallel fairways, small greens, and incorporated the natural terrain into the course design. When Wing Park Golf Course opened on September 5, 1908, Elgin became the smallest city in the country with a public golf course.

The Wing Park Golf Club was established on September 14, 1912, with 88 charter members. They purchased the property across from the course entrance and built a club house the next year. The club house was an American Craftsman bungalow with a veranda facing the course. The club sold an additional 200 memberships for $25 each. By 1921, Wing Park was so successful that Elgin had to ban non-residents from playing the course on weekends. Non-residents still flocked to the field, prompting Elgin in the mid-1920s to impose a fifty cent fee to residents and a dollar fee for non-residents to further increase availability to residents. In 1926, plans were made to buy and adjacent property and convert Wing Park to an 18-hole course, but these were halted by the Great Depression. It was listed on the National Register of Historic Places on February 18, 2009. The property was the Highlighted Property of the Week when the National Park Service released its weekly list of February 27, 2009. Today, it is the second-oldest extant golf course in Illinois (next to Jackson Park), and the oldest to retain its original conformation.

All holes were named in the early days of the golf course.

Hole #	Name	Yards
1	The Lark	320
2	Purgatory	410
3	East View	320
4	Hoot Mon	405
5	Speedway	237
6	Boulevard	530
7	Dress Parade	465
8	Highlands	450
9	A Wee Drop	150
