= FM H-12-44 =

American diesel locomotive

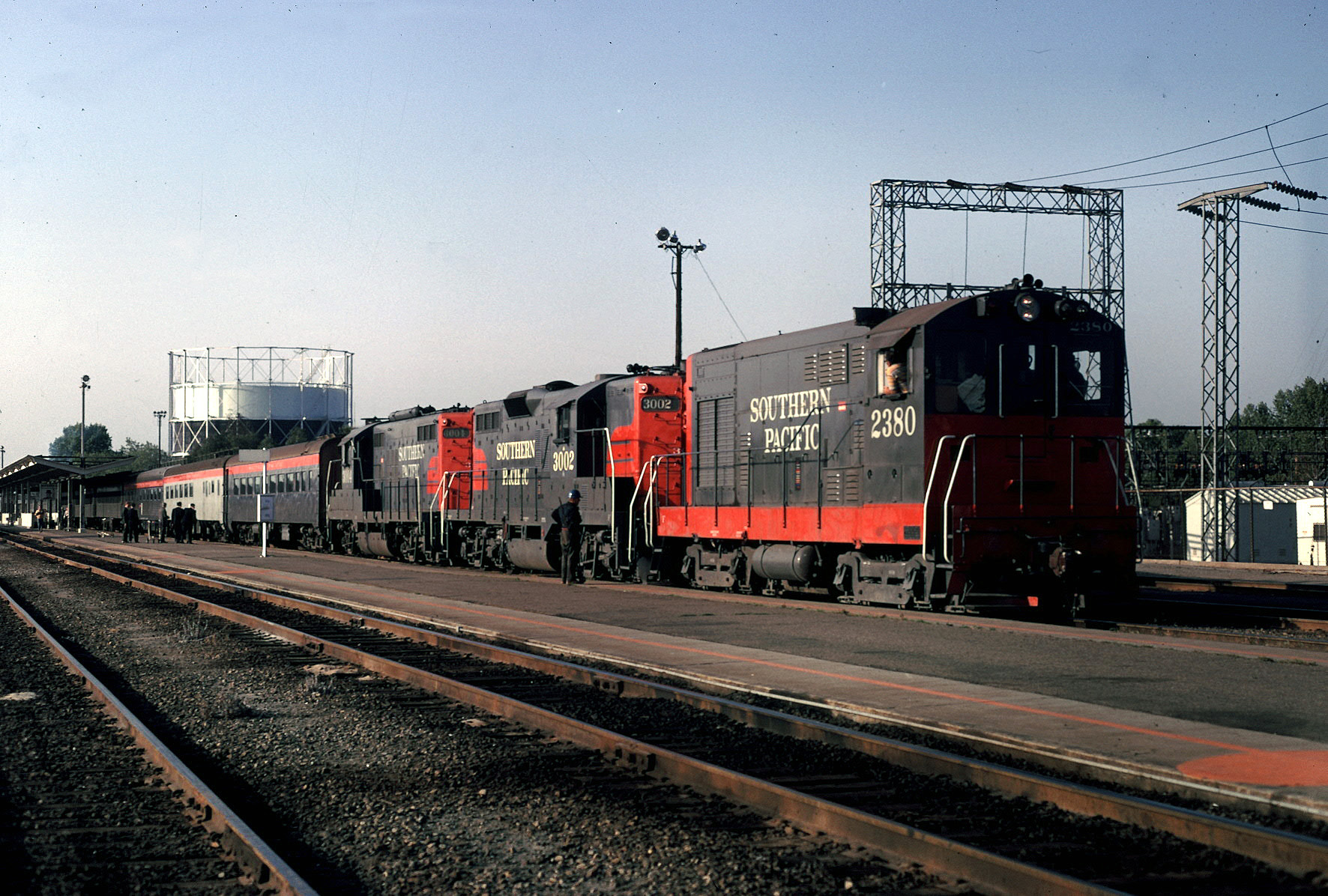
- SP #2380 backs the Del Monte into San Jose in April 1971, a week before the Amtrak takeover.
Type and origin
- Power type: Diesel-electric
- Builder: Fairbanks-Morse
- Model: H-12-44
- Build date: May 1950 – March 1961
- Total produced: 336
Specifications
- Configuration
  - AAR: B-B
- Gauge: 4 ft 8 1/2 in (1,435 mm)
- Trucks: AAR type A
- Wheel diameter: 40 in (1,016 mm)
- Minimum curve: 29.50 (194 ft (59.13 m) radius)
- Wheelbase: 33 ft 6 in (10.21 m)
- Length: 48 ft 10 in (14.88 m)
- Width: 10 ft 4 in (3.15 m)
- Height: 14 ft 6 5/8 in (4.44 m)
- Loco weight: 240,000 lb (108.9 t)
- Prime mover: FM 38D-8 1/8
- Engine type: Opposed piston Two-stroke diesel
- Aspiration: Roots blower
- Displacement: 6,222 cu in (101.96 L)
- Generator: FM DGZJ
- Traction motors: (4) FM DRZH
- Cylinders: 6 (Opposed piston)
- Cylinder size: 8.125 in × 10 in (206 mm × 254 mm)
- Loco brake: Straight air
- Train brakes: Air
Performance figures
- Maximum speed: 60 mph (97 km/h)
- Power output: 1,200 hp (895 kW)
- Tractive effort: 40,440 lbf (179.9 kN))
Career
- Locale: North America
- Disposition: Most scrapped, sixteen examples preserved

The FM H-12-44 was a switcher locomotive produced by Fairbanks-Morse from May 1950 until March 1961. The units had a 1,200-horsepower (890 kW), six-cylinder opposed piston engine prime mover, and were configured in a B-B wheel arrangement mounted atop a pair of two-axle AAR Type-A switcher trucks, with all axles powered and geared for a top speed of 60 miles per hour (97 km/h).

Of the 336 H-12-44 locomotives produced, 303 were for American railroads, 30 were made between August 1951 to June 1956 by the Canadian Locomotive Company for use in Canada, and one was exported to Mexico.

H-12-44s were visually indistinguishable from the predecessor FM H-10-44 until September 1952, when the Raymond Loewy design elements were removed to reduce production costs. Cab lines were squared-off, the slanted-nose styling was discontinued, and the roof visor was eliminated. The following year, the fairing over the battery box was removed and louvers added to reduce the chance of battery explosions. Production paused from May to October 1956, after which the carbodies were shortened by some three feet and outfitted with a deeper side skirt.

Sixteen intact examples of the H-12-44 are known to survive, all of which are owned by railroad museums or historical societies.

== Units produced by Fairbanks-Morse (1950–1961) ==
Image	Railroad	Quantity	Road numbers	Notes
	Fairbanks-Morse (demonstrator)	1	76	to Yankeetown Dock Corporation 1
	Atchison, Topeka and Santa Fe Railway	59	503–540, 544–564	3 custom-built FM H-12-44TS locomotives 541-543. 543 survives today
	Ayrshire Collieries Corporation	1	1	to Thunderbird Collieries 1; to Yankeetown Dock 3
	Baltimore and Ohio Railroad	17	196–197, 310–319, 9722–9726	310–319 renumbered 9710–9719, 196–197 renumbered 9720–9721
	Canadian National Railway	30	1630–1659	built by Canadian Locomotive Company
	Central of Georgia Railway	4	315–318	
	Chicago and North Western Railway	9	1071–1072, 1110–1116	
	Chicago, Milwaukee, St. Paul and Pacific Railroad ("Milwaukee Road")	48	1826–1847, 2309–2325	Renumbered 700–710, 715–744, 750–756 (not in order)
	Columbia and Cowlitz Railway	1	D-2	Renumbered #700)
	Ferrocarril de Chihuahua al Pacífico	1	70	
	Indianapolis Union Railway	3	19–21	
	Kentucky and Indiana Terminal Railroad	7	60–66	
	Minneapolis, St. Paul and Sault Ste. Marie Railroad ("Soo Line")	5	315–319	
	Minnesota Western Railway	1	10	to Minneapolis, Northfield and Southern Railway 10
	New York Central Railroad	27	9111–9137	To Penn Central 8300-8326
	New York, Chicago and St. Louis Railroad ("Nickel Plate Road")	22	134–155	to Norfolk and Western Railway 2134–2155
	Pennsylvania Railroad	16	8708–8723	to Penn Central 8327–8342
	Sandersville Railroad	1	100	Renumbered 10
	St. Louis-San Francisco Railway ("Frisco")	4	282–285	
	Southern Pacific Company	43	1486–1491, 1529–1574, 1577–1596	
	Southern Pacific (Texas and New Orleans Railroad)	2	119–120	to Southern Pacific 1575–1576; renumbered 2373–2374
	Tennessee Valley Authority	1	22	
	United States Army	20	1843–1862	
	U.S. Steel, Morrisville, Pennsylvania	8	GE9–GE16	
	Wabash Railroad	3	384–386	to Norfolk and Western 3384–3386
	White River Lumber Company(Weyerhaeuser Timber Company)	1	WTC 1	To Pacific Transportation Services 121 then transferred to Northwest Railway Museum where it is preserved in running condition
	Yankeetown Dock Corporation	1	2	
	Total	336		

== Preservation ==
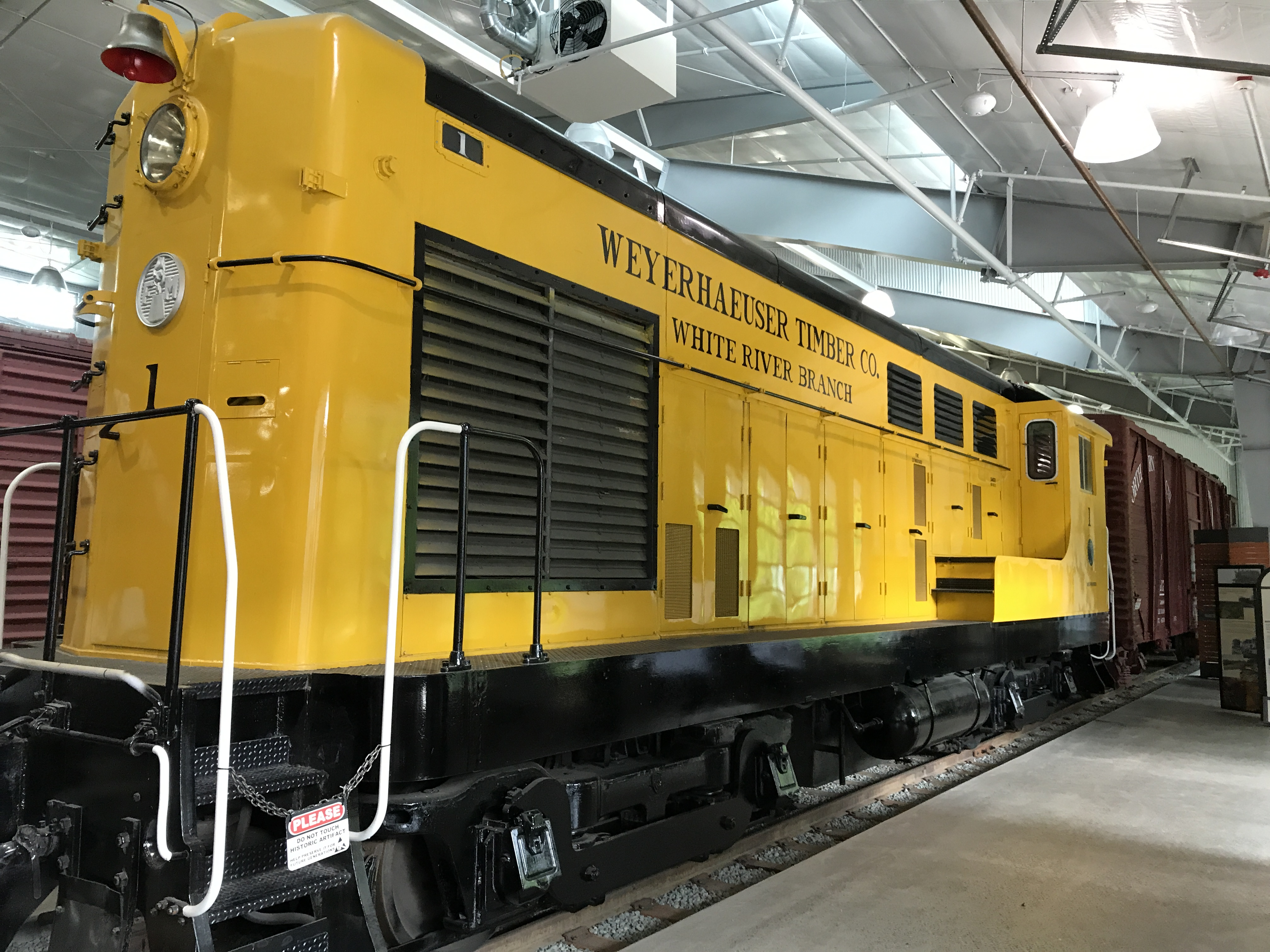
WTC 1

Several examples of the H-12-44 model have been preserved around the U.S. and Canada.

- Weyerhaeuser Timber Company #1 is preserved at the Northwest Railway Museum in Snoqualmie, Washington. After undergoing a full rebuild and engine overhaul, the locomotive is now run only for special events with its partner caboose, White River Logging Company number 001.
- Former US Army #1843 is a part of the collection at the Rochester & Genesee Valley Railroad Museum in Rush, New York (south of Rochester). It is in operable condition and is a key locomotive at the RGVRRM.
- Former US Army later US Steel #1845 is currently stored at Fairless Hills, Pennsylvania, undergoing restoration. It is privately owned.
- Former US Army #1847 is preserved at the Golden Gate Railroad Museum in Sunol, California. It is currently operational and has been painted in "Tiger Stripe" scheme to represent Southern Pacific #1487.
- Former US Army #1849 is preserved for static display at the Bluegrass Railroad Museum in Versailles, Kentucky.
- Former US Army #1850, #1853 and #1861 are stored out of service at the Heart of Dixie Railroad Museum in Calera, Alabama.
- Former US Army #1854 owned by the city of Ogden, Utah. The engine is stored at the Business Depot Ogden, former Defense Depot in Utah, as of March, 2024. It is currently lettered as Defense Logistics Agency #53205. This locomotive has been scrapped without proper permission as of June, 2025
- Former US Army #1855 preserved and operated (on excursion trains) by the Nevada State Railroad Museum Boulder City in Boulder City, Nevada.
- Former US Army #1857 is preserved at the Western Pacific Railroad Museum at Portola, California. It was used at the Sierra Army Depot at Herlong, California, located along the former Western Pacific Railroad. It is used in the museum's famous "Rent-A-Locomotive" program.
- Former US Army unit #1860, worked at Sunny Point Military Ocean Terminal. It later went to Beaufort & Morehead Railroad in North Carolina as #1860, based at the Morehead City State Ports. The North Carolina Transportation Museum acquired the locomotive in 2004 after disposition from the State Ports. It is now on run occasionally on excursions.
- Former US Steel #9121 is preserved by the United Railroad Historical Society of New Jersey. Restoration is underway at SMS Railroad in Bridgeport, New Jersey.
- Atchison, Topeka and Santa Fe #608 (formerly #508) is at the Museum of the American Railroad in Frisco, TX, following a 2017 transfer from the California State Railroad Museum in Sacramento, California.
- Atchison, Topeka and Santa Fe #560 is preserved at the Southern California Railway Museum in Perris, California
- Milwaukee Road 740 is preserved at the Mad River and NKP Railroad Museum in Bellevue, Ohio. It was originally numbered 2310.
