= FM H-12-44TS =

Model of American switcher locomotive

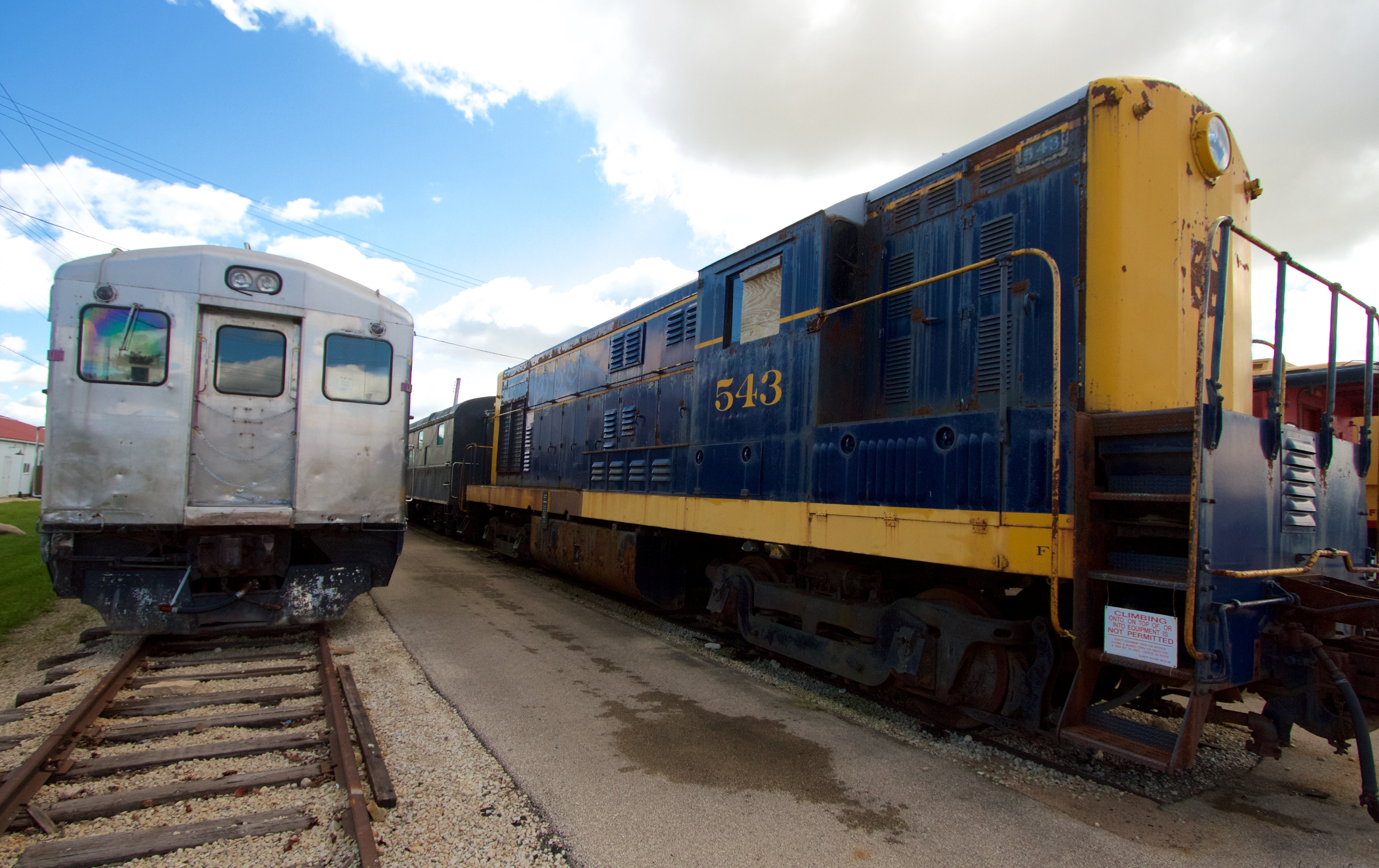
- Santa Fe #543, an FM H-12-44TS road switcher, at the Illinois Railway Museum in September of 2015.
Type and origin
- Power type: Diesel-electric
- Builder: Fairbanks-Morse
- Serial number: 12L1021–12L1023
- Model: H-12-44TS
- Build date: May 1956
- Total produced: 3
Specifications
- Configuration
  - AAR: B-B
- Gauge: 4 ft 8 1/2 in (1,435 mm) standard gauge
- Prime mover: FM 38D-8 1/8
- Engine type: Opposed piston Two-stroke diesel
- Aspiration: Roots blower
- Displacement: 6,222 cu in (101.96 L)
- Generator: DC
- Traction motors: 4 DC
- Cylinders: 6
- Cylinder size: 8.125 in × 10 in (206 mm × 254 mm)
- Transmission: Diesel-electric
- Loco brake: Straight air
- Train brakes: Air
Performance figures
- Maximum speed: 60 mph (97 km/h))
- Power output: 1,200 hp (895 kW)
Career
- Operators: Atchison, Topeka and Santa Fe Railway
- Numbers: 541–543
- Locale: North America
- Retired: 1972–1974
- Disposition: One preserved, two scrapped

The FM H-12-44TS was a light road switcher version of the Fairbanks-Morse H-12-44 yard switcher locomotive. Only three of the 1,200-horsepower (890 kW), six-cylinder opposed piston engine locomotives (builder numbers 12L1021–12L1023) were manufactured especially for the Atchison, Topeka and Santa Fe Railway in May, 1956. The units had an extended frame to accommodate the addition of a short hood behind the cab, and were configured in a B-B wheel arrangement and mounted atop a pair of two-axle AAR Type-A switcher trucks with all axles powered. H-12-44TSs also came equipped with steam generator units as they were acquired solely for shuttling passenger cars in and around the Dearborn Station terminal in Chicago, Illinois.

The locomotives (#541–#543) were delivered in the road's Zebra Stripe paint scheme, though all three would finish out their days on the Santa Fe dressed in the switcher version of the blue and yellow Billboard livery. Coinciding with the end of Santa Fe passenger train service in Chicago, #541 was retired on June 1, 1972, and sold to the Allison Steel Manufacturing Company in October of that year; #542 and #543 were both retired on May 7, 1974, though #543 (the only example to have evaded the scrap yard) was subsequently preserved in Albuquerque, New Mexico and donated to the California State Railroad Museum in March 1986. It has since been moved to the Illinois Railway Museum.
