= Nevada State Railroad Museum Boulder City =

Railroad museum in Nevada, USA

Coordinates: 35°58′13″N 114°51′24″W

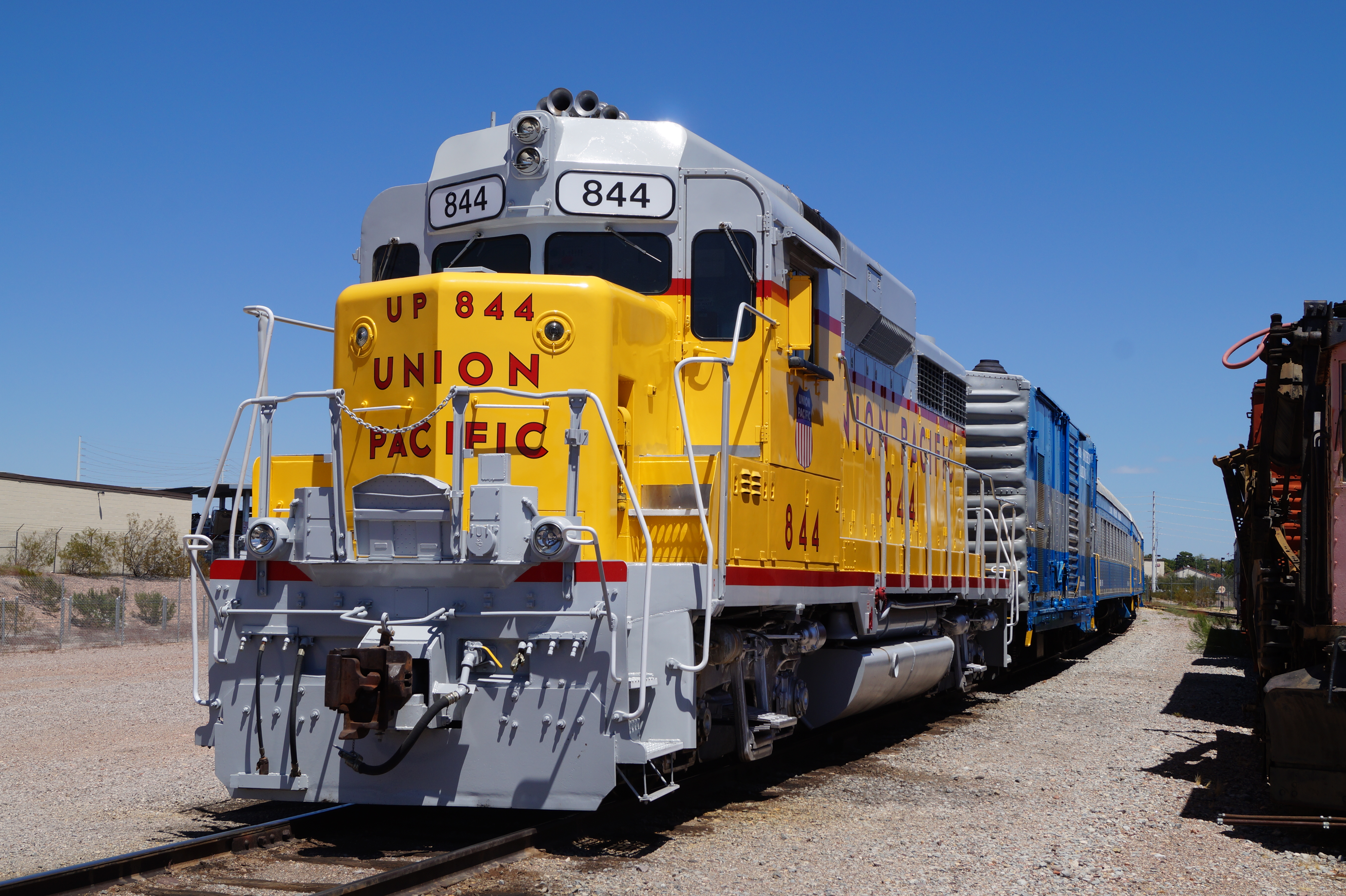
- Union Pacific EMD GP30 No. 844: The primary road power of the heritage railroad

Overview
- Headquarters: 1000 Boulder City Pkwy, Boulder City, NV 89005
- Reporting mark: NVSV
- Locale: Boulder City, Nevada
- Dates of operation: 1991–present

Technical
- Track gauge: 4 ft 8 1/2 in (1,435 mm) standard gauge
- Length: 7 mi (11 km)

Other
- Website: www.boulderrailroadmuseum.org

The Nevada State Railroad Museum Boulder City is a railroad museum in Boulder City, Nevada which is an agency of the Nevada Department of Tourism and Cultural Affairs. The museum campus is one-mile long by a city block wide with a visitor center, outdoor displays, a heritage railroad as well as a 7.5" gauge live steam railroad. The museum campus occupies the former Boulder City rail yard, and the heritage railroad operates on the Boulder Branch Line which both were built to support construction activities at the Hoover Dam. The State of Nevada obtained the tracks and right of way from Union Pacific Railroad in 1985.

== Visitor Center ==
Nevada State Railroad Museum Boulder City Visitor Center

The museum's visitor center opened to the public on September 19, 2026. The $25 million project was funded through Nevada Conversation Bonds and took 20 months to construct.

The visitor center houses exhibit displays and a small theater for visiting guests. Additionally, the facility also houses the museum's archival collection with thousands of documents, photographs, and historic artifacts. A research room and library is adjacent to the archive and available for researchers by appointment. The visitor center also has a classroom for school tours and community meeting space, and houses the museum's administrative offices.

=== Exhibits ===
Nevada State Railroad Museum Boulder City Visitor Center interior

The museum's visitor center houses exhibits that display artifacts from the museum's collection, provide information pertaining to railroading in Nevada, and contain various interactive elements to engage with audiences of all ages. The permanent exhibits focus on the connection between railroads and Nevada's mining industry and boom towns; the construction of Hoover Dam; operation of the Jackass & Western Railroad at Area 25 of the Nevada Test Site; and railroading in the present and future. There is an additional exhibit that explains how steam and diesel-electric locomotives work.

A seven minute video plays every half hour in the theater that traces Nevada's rail history from the 19th century to present.

An audio guide is available in multiple languages through the Nevada State Museums app.

== Nevada Southern Railway ==
The museum's excursion train pauses at Henderson before returning to Boulder City with the Las Vegas Strip in the background.

The museum operates a heritage railroad which offers passenger excursion trains using historic railroad equipment on a 10-mile, 45 minute round trip. Operations began in 2001, and the museum also offers the opportunity for passengers to ride in the locomotive cab, the caboose and to operate trains (subject to reservations and availability).

This ride is powered by one of four operating locomotives in the museum's collection. The primary operating locomotive is Union Pacific EMD GP30, No 844, which became famous for necessitating the renumbering of steam locomotive 844 to 8444 from 1962 to 1989. It weighs approximately 125 tons and has a turbocharged V16 engine that develops 2250hp. It was donated to the museum and refurbished in Union Pacific colors.

The museum also operates United States Army Transportation Corps No. 1855, a Fairbanks-Morse H12-44 built in 1953; Union Pacific No. DS1000 an EMC NW2 built in 1939; and Jackass & Western No. L-3 a General Electric 80-ton switcher built in 1953.

As part of the Interstate 11 project NDOT has replaced the bridge over Interstate 11 that was taken out of service in 1998 during the widening of Highway 93 into Interstate 515. In April 2018, a grade separation was put in place at Dawson Avenue re-linking Boulder City and Henderson together. The museum utilizes one-mile of track between Interstate 11 and Paradise Hills Drive during its excursions and can interchange with Union Pacific Railroad at Paradise Hills.

== 7½ inch miniature railway ==
The museums 7.5 inch (190.5mm) miniature railway.

The museum operates a 7 1/2 in (190.5 mm) gauge railroad. The miniatures are 1/8th full size and accommodate children and adults easily. Rides on the miniature railroad are included with museum admission and normally operate on the second and fourth Saturdays of the months between September and May.

== Equipment ==
Locomotives
| Name | Class | Locomotive Type | Images | Manufacturer | Year built | Status | Notes |
|---|---|---|---|---|---|---|---|
| Eureka 12 | | Steam | | Baldwin Locomotive Works | 1896 | Awaiting restoration | Narrow gauge (3 ft) |
| Union Pacific 264 | C2 | Steam | | Baldwin Locomotive Works | 1903 | On display | |
| Pacific Lumber 35 | | Steam | | Baldwin Locomotive Works | 1923 | On display | Was also used on the Heber Valley Railroad |
| United States Bureau of Reclamation | 30-tonner | Gasoline | A small gasoline powered grey locomotive with Bureau of Reclamation written in black on the side of the cab. | Davenport | 1936 | On display | Used for the construction of the Hoover Dam |
| Union Pacific 1000 | NW2 | Diesel | | EMD | 1939 | Operational | Painted in the Nevada Southern Railway livery |
| Jackass & Western L-3 | 25 tonner | Diesel | | GE | 1943 | On display | Also operated on the Nevada Test Site |
| US Army Transportation Corps 1855 | H-12-44 | Diesel | A black railroad locomotive with diagonal yellow safety stripes and white text reading United States Army | Fairbanks-Morse | 1953 | Operational | Operated at the Sierra Army Depot. Donated to the museum in 1991. Restored by the museum 2022-2026. |
| Jackass & Western L-2 | 80 tonner | Diesel | | GE | 1953 | Operational | Also operated on the Nevada Test Site |
| Union Pacific 844 | GP30 | Diesel | | EMD | 1963 | Operational | |
| Amtrak 315 | F40PHR | Diesel | | EMD | 1979 | Awaiting cosmetic restoration | This locomotive is inoperable as it lacks a prime mover. |

== See also ==
- Nevada State Railroad Museum – A railroad museum located in Carson City, Nevada
