= Milwaukee & Suburban Transport Corporation =

Former public transport company

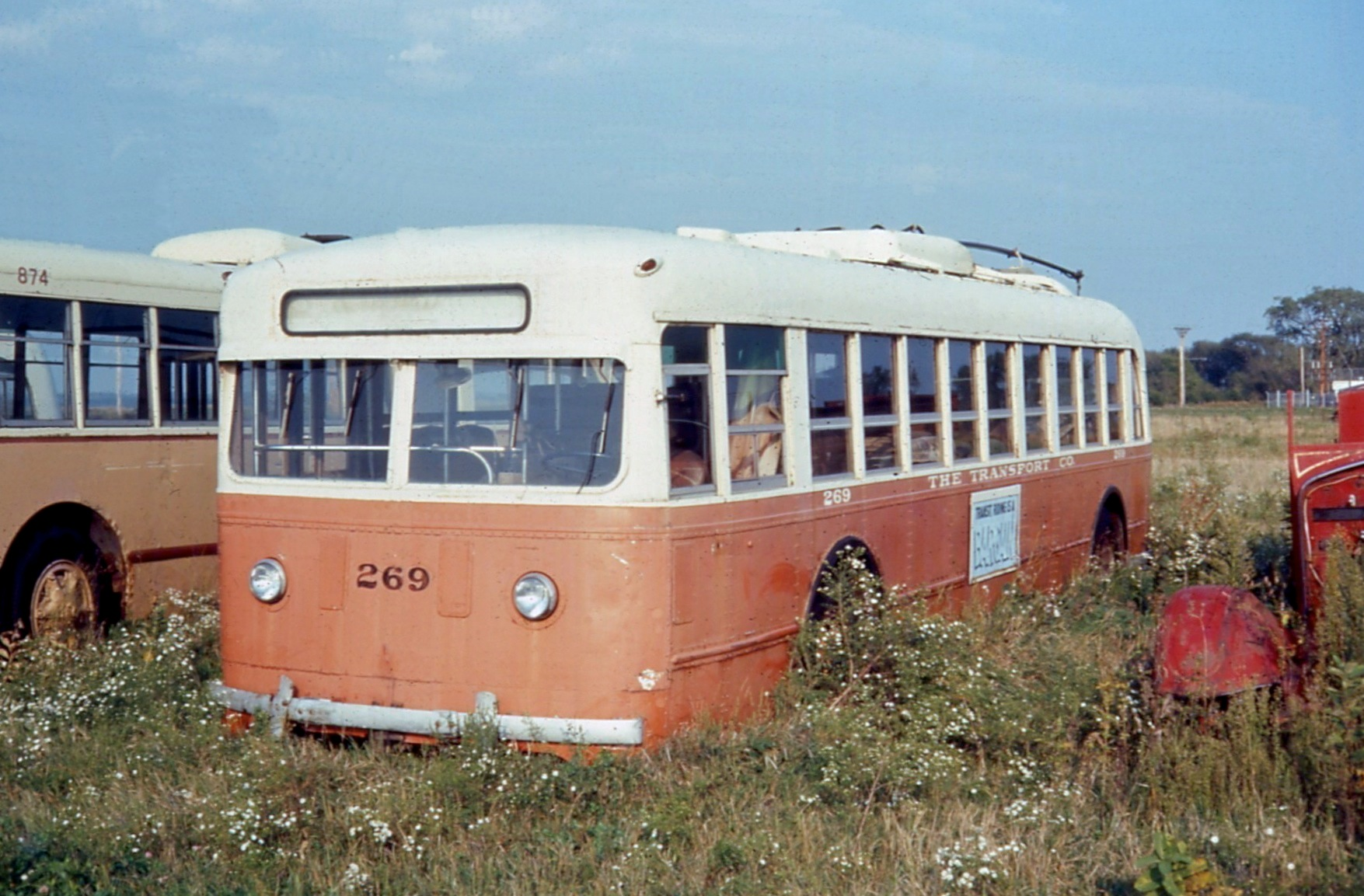
- Transport Company trolleybus at IRM in 1968

Overview
- Headquarters: Milwaukee, Wisconsin
- Reporting mark: M&TS
- Locale: Wisconsin
- Dates of operation: January 1, 1953–June 1, 1975
- Predecessor: The Milwaukee Electric Railway & Transport Co.
- Successor: Milwaukee County Transit System

Technical
- Track gauge: 4 ft 8 1/2 in (1,435 mm) standard gauge
- Electrification: 600 V DC

The Milwaukee & Suburban Transport Corporation, commonly known as the Transport Company, was a public transport company in Milwaukee, Wisconsin.

== History ==
Milwaukee had been served by horse drawn trolleys since 1859, and had many small companies serving different parts of the city. On April 3, 1890, the first electric street car was put into operation ushering in a new paradigm in Milwaukee's public transportation. The North American Company, a holding company controlled by Henry Villard, bought and consolidated all of the small tram companies into The Milwaukee Electric Railway & Light Co. on February 1, 1896. Under this new management an extensive streetcar and interurban system was created serving most of south eastern Wisconsin. Along with providing public transportation it was providing public utilities. TMER&L began to slowly convert its streetcar operations to trackless trolleys in the 1930s after labor strikes, federal pressure to break up the company, and the Great Depression made management feel there was no future in streetcar operations. In 1938, TMER&L was split into two companies The Wisconsin Electric Power Co. and The Milwaukee Electric Railway & Transport Co. because of the Public Utility Holding Company Act of 1935, which made out of state holding companies operating public utilities illegal. During World War II the "Transport Company" began selling its interurban lines and assets to small companies that would convert the service to bus and sell of the rail equipment for scrap at a profit. In 1947 WEP co. began to sell the transportation subsidiary but the deal had been unable to go through.

In October 1952 investors bought TMER&T for $10,000,000 ($97,281,886 in 2020) and began operating as the Milwaukee & Suburban Transport Corp. on January 1, 1953. The new management began replacing streetcars with gas and diesel buses at an even faster pace than previous efforts. The "Transport Company" also did not continue the expansion of electric buses after 1955. On March 2, 1958, the last streetcar took its passengers from downtown Milwaukee to the suburbs of Wauwatosa and West Allis, ending 99 years of trolleys in the city. In 1964, with the completion of the new interstate freeway system the M&TS introduced the "Freeway Flyer" from Mayfair Shopping Center to downtown, a service that proved to be very popular and continues today. Finally on June 20, 1965, the last trackless trolley ran in Milwaukee ending the last remnant of a once large electric empire. The "Transit Company" was one of the last private mass transit systems in the county that was not subsidized by a government entity when it was bought by the County of Milwaukee on July 1, 1975.

== Equipment ==
=== Bus roster ===
| Fleet number | Year | Manufacturer | Model | Notes |
|---|---|---|---|---|
| 1195-1199 | 1945 | GMC | TD-4007 | Ex-Indianapolis Transit 440, 439, 437-438 & 436 |
| 1320-1340 | 1953 | GMC | TDH-5105 | |
| 1341-1378 | 1954 | GMC | TDH-5105 | |
| 1379-1403 | 1955 | GMC | TDH-5105 | |
| 1404-1433 | 1956 | GMC | TDH-5105 | |
| 1434-1463 | 1957 | GMC | TDH-5105 | |
| 1464-1483 | 1959 | GMC | TDH-5105 | 1483 has been preserved by David Buzek. |
| 1484-1503 | 1960 | GMC | TDH-5301 | |
| 1504-1586 | 1962 | GMC | TDH-5301 | 1578 has been preserved by David Buzek. |
| 601-1675 | 1963 | GMC | TDH-5303 | |
| 1701-1730 | 1964 | GMC | TDH-5303 | |
| 1751-1760 | 1960 | GMC | TDH-5301 | Ex-Triboro Coach Corporation 751–760; bought in 1965. |
| 1761-1770 | 1960 | GMC | TDH-5302 | Ex-Triboro Coach Corporation 761–770; bought in 1965. 1761 and 1762 were sightseeing buses and featured scenic windows. |
| 1801-1863 | 1965 | GMC | TDH-5303 | |
| 1901-1912 | 1966 | GMC | TDH-5303 | Refurbished by the Milwaukee County Transit System in 1982; retired in 2001. |
| 1913-1960 | 1966 | GMC | TDH-5303 | Refurbished by the Milwaukee County Transit System in 1982; retired in 2001. |
| 2001-2030 | 1967 | GMC | TDH-5303 | Refurbished by the Milwaukee County Transit System in 1982; retired in 2001. 2001 was converted into a exclusive bus for disability and elderly services |

=== Trolley bus roster ===
Operation began (with The Milwaukee Electric Railway and Light Company) on November 8, 1936, and ended on June 20, 1965. It is unknown what units were transferred from it.

| Fleet number | Year | Make | Model | Notes |
|---|---|---|---|---|
| 324-349 | 1947 | Marmon-Herrington | TC44 | 12 units to Servicio de Transportes Eléctricos in 1967. |
| 424-449 | 1948 | Marmon-Herrington | TC44 | 15 units to Servicio de Transportes Eléctricos in 1967. |
| 500-539 | 1946-47 | Marmon-Herrington | TC44 | Ex-Indianapolis Transit System 663–702; bought in 1957. 515–539 to Servicio de Transportes Eléctricos in 1967. |
| 540-549 | 1948 | Marmon-Herrington | TC48 | Ex-Indianapolis Transit System 703–712; bought in 1957. To Servicio de Transportes Eléctricos in 1964. |
| 550-564 | 1948 | Marmon-Herrington | TC48 | Ex-Indianapolis Transit System 766–780; bought in 1957. Exx-Cincinnati Transit Company 1365–1379. To Servicio de Transportes Eléctricos in 1964. |
| 565-589 | 1952 | Marmon-Herrington | TC48 | Ex-Indianapolis Transit System 741–765; bought in 1957. To Servicio de Transportes Eléctricos in 1964. |

== Preserved equipment ==
=== Streetcars ===
| No. | Class | Built | Builder | Notes |
|---|---|---|---|---|
| 846 | 800 series | 1920 | St. Louis Car Company | Preserved at the East Troy Electric Railway In Operating condition |
| 861 | 800 Series | 1920 | St. Louis Car Company | Preserved at the Seashore Trolley Museum Inoperable condition |
| 966 | 900 Series | 1927 | St. Louis Car Company | Stored at the Illinois Railway Museum Inoperable condition |
| 972 | 900 Series | 1927 | St. Louis Car Company | Preserved at the Illinois Railway Museum Inoperable condition |
| 978 | 900 series | 1929 | St. Louis Car Company | Stored at the East Troy Electric Railway Inoperable condition |

=== Trackless trolleys ===
| No. | Model | Built | Builder | Notes |
|---|---|---|---|---|
| 269 | 1711 | 1941 | St. Louis Car Company | Stored at the Illinois Railway Museum Inoperable condition |
| 350 | 102-45CX | 1948 | Pullman | Stored at the Illinois Railway Museum Inoperable condition |
| 441 | TC44 | 1948 | Marmon-Herrington | Preserved at the Illinois Railway Museum In operation |
