= Nevada Department of Tourism and Cultural Affairs =

State agency in Nevada, United States

The Nevada Department of Tourism and Cultural Affairs is a state government agency in Nevada that focuses on the promotion and regulation of Nevada's tourism and cultural industries and landmarks.

== History ==
The department was the result of a merger between the existing commission on tourism and the Nevada Department of Cultural Affairs. The tourism commission was founded in 1983, consisting of two divisions, a tourism division and a publication division. The latter published Nevada Magazine, which has been in circulation since 1936 after it was first published by the state highway department under the name Nevada Highways and Parks.

The Nevada Department of Cultural Affairs was originally known as the Department of Museums, Library, and Arts and was founded in 1993. The current structure of the newly merged department was put in place following a 2011 Nevada statute. Within this structure, the commission of tourism remained as a separate entity under the supervision of the Nevada Department of Tourism and Cultural Affairs.

== Divisions ==
The department consists of seven divisions, which are the following:

1. The Division of Tourism
2. The Division of Museums and History
3. The Board of Museums and History
4. The Nevada Arts Council
5. The Nevada Indian Commission
6. The Board of the Nevada Arts Council
7. The Commission on Tourism

== See also ==
- Nevada State Museum, Carson City
- Nevada State Museum, Las Vegas
