= Illinois Railway Museum =

Museum in Union, Illinois, U.S.

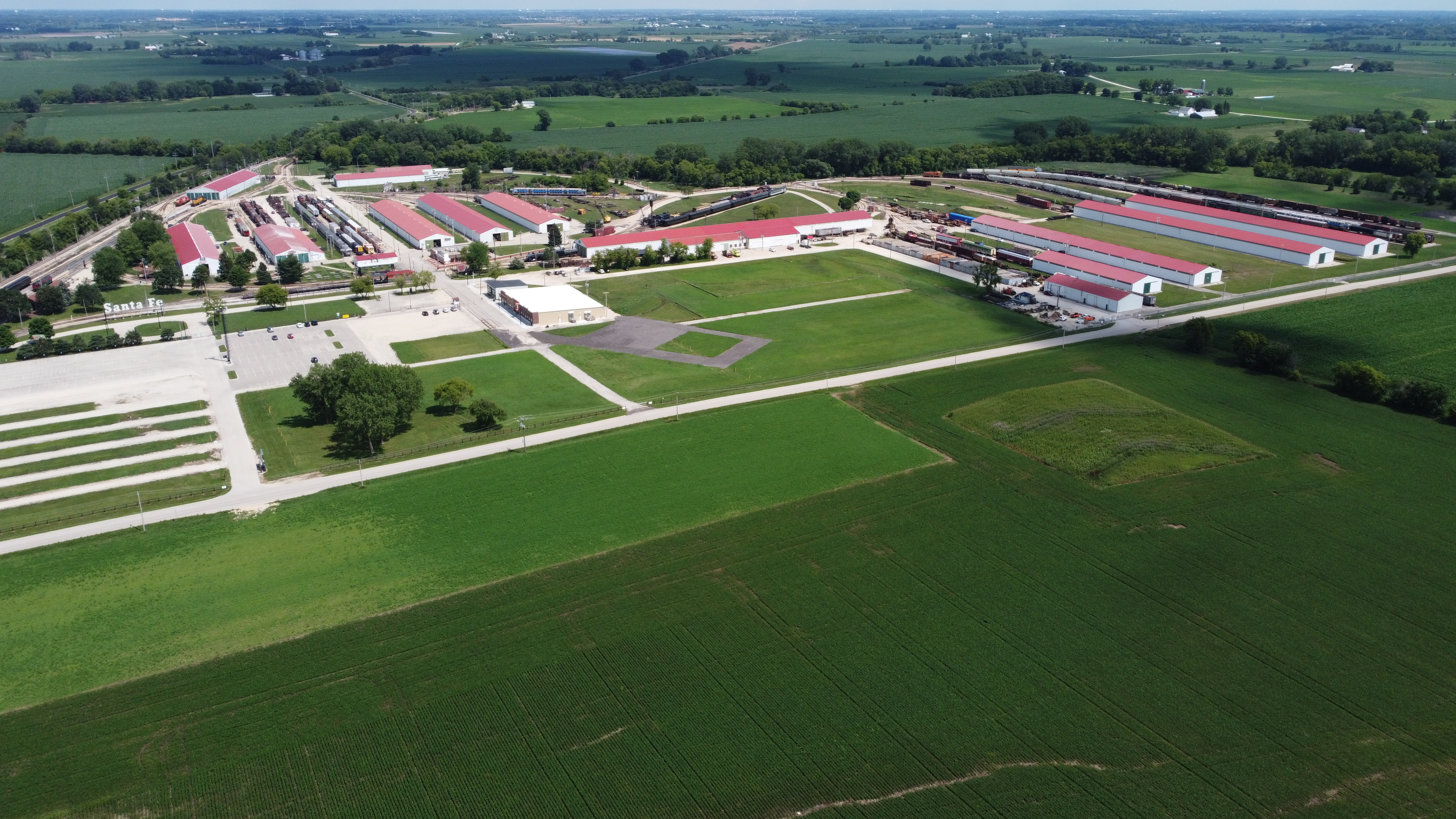
- Aerial overview of the museum
- Locale: Union, Illinois, U.S.
- Coordinates: 42°13′40″N 88°31′43″W
- Connections: Union Pacific Railroad Company

Commercial operations
- Built by: Elgin and Belvidere Electric Company
- Original gauge: 4 ft 8 1/2 in (1,435 mm) standard gauge

Preserved operations
- Reporting mark: IRMX
- Stations: Mainline: 2; Streetcar loop: 5
- Length: 4.6 mi (7.4 km)
- Preserved gauge: 4 ft 8 1/2 in (1,435 mm) standard gauge

Preservation history
- 1953: Opened as Illinois Electric Railway Museum
- 1956: Elgin and Belvidere Electric Company right-of-way acquired
- March 1962: Renamed Illinois Railway Museum
- March 1964: Museum relocated to Union, Illinois
- July 17, 1966: Illinois Terminal Railroad interurban car 415 first operated
- October 29, 1967: First steam locomotive operated
- January 1972: First storage barn erected
- 1981: Streetcar loop constructed
- May 31, 1982: Railroad mainline is extended
- September 1991: Railroad mainline to Kishwaukee Grove is completed
- Headquarters: Union, Illinois

Website
- irm.org

The Illinois Railway Museum (IRM, (reporting mark IRMX) is a railroad museum located in Union, Illinois, and the largest railroad museum in the United States. It is located in the Chicago metropolitan area at 7000 Olson Road in Union, Illinois, 55 miles (89 km) northwest of downtown Chicago.

== History ==
The museum was founded in 1953 by ten people who joined to purchase Indiana Railroad interurban car 65. Originally called the Illinois Electric Railway Museum, the museum was located on the grounds of the Chicago Hardware Foundry in North Chicago. In March 1962, it was renamed to the Illinois Railway Museum to reflect its expanding scope. In March 1964, the museum moved to Union, Illinois along the former right-of-way of the Elgin and Belvidere Electric Company. On July 17, 1966, passenger service officially began when Illinois Terminal Railroad interurban car 415 operated for the very first time at the museum. On October 29, 1967, the first steam locomotive, J. Neils Lumber Company 5, operated for the first time at the museum. The first storage barn began construction in 1971 and was erected in January 1972. In 1981, a one-mile (1.6 km) streetcar loop was constructed. The right-of-way the museum was constructed next to still had back taxes into the 1980s. To gain full use of the track, the museum paid the back taxes, and gained the 4.6 miles (7.4 km) of railroad track to add to their property portfolio. The museum celebrated their mainline extension on May 31, 1982. In September 1991, the railroad mainline to Kishwaukee Grove was completed. In 2016, the IRM purchased a 130-foot turntable from Union Pacific's former Denver & Rio Grande Western Burnham Shops complex in Denver for $10,000. The turntable is large enough for any locomotive in their collection, and will be used to store their steam locomotives, along with a planned roundhouse. There are over 500 pieces of equipment, and over 100 acres of land owned by the museum.

== Operations ==
The museum's operations are primarily concentrated around its main campus just east of Union. Train rides are offered on the main line as well as the streetcar loop. Electric trains are operated from April through October and diesel and steam trains from the beginning of May through the end of September. Trolleybus operation occurs on the Saturdays of the Memorial Day, Independence Day, and Labor Day weekends, as well as on "Bus Day"; the last Saturday in September or the first Saturday in October. IRM is one of only two railway museums in the country that operates both electric and diesel trains, and the only one to offer trolleybus rides on a regular basis.

== Equipment and structures ==
=== Museum site and structures ===
The Illinois Railway Museum property covers more than 80 acres (32 ha), the most extensive physical plant of any rail museum in North America. In 2009, the museum bought another 89 acres (36 ha) of adjacent land as a buffer against development. The main campus is located at 42°13′40.0″N 88°31′38.08″W. In addition to the museum's revenue trackage, the main campus in Union includes:

- 11 equipment storage barns with a total of 3.25 miles (5.23 km) of track under cover.
- Two additional garages housing trolleybuses and motor buses.
- A dedicated steam restoration shop.
- A former Chicago and North Western railway depot from Marengo, Illinois, built in 1851.
- A complete Chicago Rapid Transit Company ground-level station (50th Avenue station, closed by CTA in 1978)
- Five streetcar stations of varying design.
- Several restored and functional neon signs and concrete entablatures on display.
- An indoor dining facility built in 2003. (open seasonally)
- The Multi-purpose Building completed in 2021 housing the Model Railroad Display, the Revolving Exhibit Gallery, the Pullman Archive, and the Milwaukee Road Historic Association.
- A 130-foot (40 m) turntable from the Union Pacific Railroad's Burnham Shops.
- Seven railroad crossings and thirteen signals, with five wigwags. Two of the five wigwags are upper-quadrant wigwags from the Magnetic Signal Company, one from the Union Switch & Signal, and the other two are lower quadrant wigwag from the Western Railroad Supply Company. The other two crossings are from the Griswold Signal Company.

IRM also owns one off-site library; the Strahorn Research Library in downtown Marengo. The Pullman Archive, formerly located in downtown Union, IL moved on campus to the Multi-purpose Building in 2021.

== Organization ==
The Illinois Railway Museum is an IRS Chapter 501(c)(3) nonprofit corporation owned and managed by its membership. Museum management includes a board of directors, elected by the regular membership of about 160 active volunteers. A board president is elected by the directors. The board oversees the general manager, a volunteer who in turn has oversight over an array of department heads. Major departments include Steam, Diesel, Electric Car, Passenger Car, Freight Car, Track & Signal, Buildings & Grounds, Trolley Bus, Motor Bus, and Operations. Other departments oversee the museum's libraries, electrical infrastructure, and display and education functions. Most department heads are volunteers. All workers at the museum fall under the direct authority of one of the department heads. The vast majority of workers are volunteers. Anyone who is interested in trains or other collections/aspects of the museum is actively encouraged to volunteer, with required training done by the museum.

== Appearances in media ==
IRM has been used in several films, due to its proximity to Chicago and its extensive collection of historic railroad equipment. In the 1992 film A League of Their Own, starring Tom Hanks, Geena Davis, and Madonna, the museum's depot was used for several small-town depot scenes; other scenes featured with the Nebraska Zephyr and only surviving EMD E5. The 1993 movie Groundhog Day featured the museum's EMD SD24 diesel locomotive. The museum's grounds and some of the passenger cars were used in the movie The Babe, starring John Goodman. In late 2005, the Burlington 9911A and several coaches operated to Chicago for filming in Flags of Our Fathers, a Clint Eastwood film. Transformers: Age of Extinction (2014) made IRM the host of several scenes.

Many television shows' railroad sequences have been shot at the IRM. Scenes depicting steam era operations in the late 1920s were shot for the 1993 television series The Untouchables. The show Chicago Fire features the IRM onsite in the season 2 episode 7 "No Regrets".

== Collection ==
=== Locomotives ===
Locomotive details (Note: Attributed to multiple sources:)
Number	Image	Type	Model	Built	Builder	Status	Previous owner(s)
1630		Steam	2-10-0	1918	Baldwin Locomotive Works	Undergoing 1,472-day inspection and overhaul	St. Louis–San Francisco Railway, Eagle-Picher Mining and Smelting Company
7		Steam	0-4-0	1917	Vulcan Iron Works	Display	American Creosote Works
231		Diesel	F40PHR	1977	Electro-Motive Division	Operational	Amtrak, Dynamic Rail Preservation
6976		Diesel	SDF40-2	1974	Electro-Motive Division	Operational	Amtrak, Atchison, Topeka and Santa Fe Railway, BNSF Railway, Dynamic Rail Preservation
92		Diesel	FP45	1967	Electro-Motive Division	Operational	Atchison, Topeka and Santa Fe Railway
2903		Steam	4-8-4	1943	Baldwin Locomotive Works	Display	Atchison, Topeka and Santa Fe Railway, Museum of Science and Industry
BN-1		Diesel	F9A	1954	Electro-Motive Division	Operational	Northern Pacific Railway, Burlington Northern Railroad
BN-2		Diesel	F9B	1954	Electro-Motive Division	Operational	Northern Pacific Railway, Burlington Northern Railroad
BN-3		Diesel	E9A	1956	Electro-Motive Division	Operational	Chicago, Burlington & Quincy Railroad, Burlington Northern Railroad
5383		Diesel	U30C	1974	GE Transportation	Operational	Burlington Northern Railroad
9400		Diesel	SD70MAC	1993	Electro-Motive Division	Operational	Burlington Northern Railroad, BNSF Railway
1802		Diesel	SD20	1959, rebuilt 1978	Electro-Motive Division	Operational, to be repainted	Union Pacific, Illinois Central Gulf Railroad, Will County Coal Handling
91		Diesel	Boxcab	1926	American Locomotive Company, General Electric, Ingersoll-Rand	Under restoration	Delaware Lackawanna & Western Railroad, Ingersoll-Rand
314		Diesel	FA2	1956	American Locomotive Company	Under restoration	Louisville and Nashville Railroad, Long Island Railroad, Feather River Rail Society
2707		Steam	2-8-4	1943	American Locomotive Company	Display	Chesapeake & Ohio Railway, City of Cincinnati, Ohio
103		Diesel	VO-660	1945	Baldwin Locomotive Works	Display	Wyandotte Terminal
B71		Diesel	Diesel-Electric Visibility Cab	1930	Baldwin-Westinghouse	Undergoing cosmetic restoration	American Rolling Mill Company
E110		Diesel	LS-1200	1951	Lima-Hamilton	Display	AK Steel Holdings Corporation
1366		Diesel	H-20-44	1947	Fairbanks-Morse	Display	Union Pacific Railroad, Southwestern Portland Cement Company
543		Diesel	H-12-44TS	1956	Fairbanks-Morse	Display	California State Railroad Museum
25		Diesel-TC-Mech	JDT25	1959	Plymouth Locomotive Works	Operational	DuPont—Lakeland Line
14		Diesel	SC	1937	Electro-Motive Corporation	Display	Dardanelle & Russellville Railroad
96B		Diesel-Electric	F7B	1951	Electro Motive Division	Display	Milwaukee Road
2		Diesel-TC-Mech	12DM38	1951	Whitcomb Company	Operational	Joy Manufacturing
1792		Gas-Electric	Unknown	1928	Davenport	Display	Unknown
504		Diesel	SD24	1960	Electro-Motive Division	Operational	Chicago, Burlington & Quincy Railroad, Burlington Northern Railroad
1951		Diesel	RS1	1957	American Locomotive Company	Display	Grand Trunk Western Railroad
33C		Diesel	E9A	1956	Electro-Motive Division	Under restoration	Milwaukee Road
37A		Diesel	E9A	1961	Electro-Motive Division	Awaiting restoration	Milwaukee Road
637		Steam	4-6-0	1892	Rogers Locomotive and Machine Works	Display	Chicago, Burlington & Quincy Railroad, City of Aurora, Illinois
3007		Steam	4-6-4	1930	Baldwin Locomotive Works	Display	Chicago, Burlington & Quincy Railroad, City of Griggsville, Illinois
4963		Steam	2-8-2	1923	Baldwin Locomotive Works	Display	Chicago, Burlington & Quincy Railroad, Chicago scrapyard
1603		Diesel	HH600	1939	American Locomotive Company	Display	Milwaukee Road
9255		Diesel	SW7	1950	Electro-Motive Division	Operational	Chicago, Burlington & Quincy Railroad, Burlington Northern Railroad
9911A (Silver Pilot)		Diesel	E5	1940	Electro-Motive Division	Operational	Chicago, Burlington and Quincy Railroad
9976		Diesel	E9A	1953	Electro-Motive Division	Operational	Chicago, Burlington and Quincy Railroad, Burlington Northern Railroad
411		Diesel	F7A	1949	Electro-Motive Division	Operational	Chicago and North Western Railway, Metra
515		Diesel	E8A	1953	Electro-Motive Division	Operational	Chicago & North Western Railway, Metra, Iowa Pacific Holdings
1518		Diesel	GP7	1949	Electro-Motive Division	Operational	Chicago and North Western Railway
1689		Diesel	RSD-5	1954	American Locomotive Company	Operational	Chicago & North Western Railway, Cuyahoga Valley Scenic Railroad
6847		Diesel	SD40-2	1974	Electro-Motive Division	Operational	Chicago and North Western Railway, Union Pacific Railroad
7009		Diesel	SD50	1985	Electro-Motive Division	Operational	Chicago and North Western Railway, Union Pacific Railroad, National Railway Equipment
5		Steam	0-6-0	1922	Baldwin Locomotive Works	Display	Chicago scrapyard
15		Diesel	SW1	1950	Electro-Motive Division	Operational	Midwest Generation LLC
9		Steam	2-6-2	1925	H.K. Porter, Inc.	Display	Coronet Phosphate
16		Steam	4-4-0	1915	Baldwin Locomotive Works	Display	Detroit, Toledo & Ironton, The Henry Ford Museum
6323		Steam	4-8-4	1942	American Locomotive Company	Display	Grand Trunk Western Railroad, Private owner in Detroit, Michigan
8380		Steam	0-8-0	1929	Baldwin Locomotive Works	Display	Northwestern Steel and Wire Company
26		Steam	2-6-0	1926	Baldwin Locomotive Works	Display	Graysonia Nashville & Ashdown
2407		Diesel	RSD-15	1960	American Locomotive Company	Operational	Atchison, Topeka, & Santa Fe Railway, Green Bay and Western Railroad
201		Steam	2-4-4T	1880	Rogers Locomotive and Machine Works	Display	Illinois Central Railroad
3719		Steam	2-6-0	1900	American Locomotive Company	Display	Steamtown, U.S.A.
1605		Diesel	GP7	1953	Electro-Motive Division	Operational	Illinois Terminal Railroad, Norfolk and Western Railroad
5		Steam	Shay	1929	Lima Locomotive Works	Operational	J. Neils Lumber Co.
35		Steam	2-8-0	1916	Baldwin Locomotive Works	Display	Marquette and Huron Mountain Railroad
207		Steam	0-6-0	1936	Baldwin Locomotive Works	Display	Private owner in Detroit, Michigan
99		Steam	2-8-0	1919	Baldwin Locomotive Works	Display	Louisiana and Arkansas Railway, South Shore Railroad
902		Diesel	GP9	1957	Electro-Motive Division	Display	MBTA
606		Diesel	AS-416	1950	Baldwin Locomotive Works	Display	Columbus & Greenville Railroad
308		Diesel	F7A	1949	Electro-Motive Division	Operational	Chicago and North Western Railway, Metra
614		Diesel	F40C	1974	Electro-Motive Division	Under restoration	Milwaukee Road, Metra
30		Inspection car	Sedan	1947	Dodge	Display	Mid-Continent Railway Museum
118C		Diesel	F7A	1951	Electro-Motive Division	Operational	Milwaukee Road
265		Steam	4-8-4	1944	American Locomotive Company	Display	Milwaukee Road, City of Milwaukee, Wisconsin
760		Diesel	H-10-44	1944	Fairbanks-Morse	Operational	Milwaukee Road
21		Diesel	DT-6-6-2000	1948	Baldwin Locomotive Works	Display	Minneapolis, Northfield and Southern Railway
200		Diesel	RS-3	1951	American Locomotive Company	Operational	Minnesota Transfer Railway
945		Diesel	RPA4U Slug	1977	Southeastern Specialties	Display	Southern Railway
14		Diesel	S-1	1947	American Locomotive Company	Operational	Nekoosa Paper, Inc.
2050		Steam	2-8-8-2	1923	American Locomotive Company	Display	Norfolk & Western Railway, AK Steel Holding
7		Steam	0-6-0	1926	Baldwin Locomotive Works	Display	Central Illinois Public Service Company
938		Steam	4-6-2	1910	American Locomotive Company	Display	Rock Island Railroad
4506		Diesel	GP9R	1952	Electro-Motive Division	Operational	Chicago, Rock Island and Pacific Railroad, Chicago & North Western Railway
975		Steam	2-10-2	1918	American Locomotive Company	Display	Southern Pacific Railway
1518		Diesel	SD7	1951	Electro-Motive Division	Operational	Southern Pacific
400		Diesel	RS-11	1958	American Locomotive Company	Display	Toledo, Peoria and Western Railroad
800		Diesel	C424	1964	American Locomotive Company	Display	Morristown and Erie Railway
101		Steam	2-6-2	1924	Baldwin Locomotive Works	Display	T. R. Miller
4		Fireless	0-4-0	1946	H.K. Porter, Inc.	Display	Union Electric Co.
18		Gas turbine	GTEL	1960	GE Transportation	Display	Union Pacific Railroad
428		Steam	2-8-0	1900	Baldwin Locomotive Works	Under restoration	Union Pacific Railroad
1848		Diesel	Dash 8-40B	1988	GE Transportation	Operational	Cotton Belt Railroad, Union Pacific Railroad
6930 (Centennial)		Diesel	DDA40X	1970	Electro-Motive Division	Under restoration	Union Pacific Railroad
260		Diesel	U28B	1967	General Electric	Operational	Chicago, Burlington & Quincy Railroad, Burlington Northern, Transkentucky Transportation Railroad
5056		Diesel	U25B	1966	General Electric	Under restoration	Milwaukee Road, Miller Compressing Co.
501		Diesel	44-ton switcher	1944	General Electric	Display	Unknown
Lone Star Cement		Diesel	25-ton switcher	1942	General Electric	Operational	Unknown
8537		Diesel	45-ton switcher	1944	GE Transportation	Operational	United States Army Transportation Corps
967B		Diesel-Electric	E9B	1955	Electro-Motive Division	Operational	Wisconsin and Southern Railroad
7525		Diesel	SD45	1971	Electro-Motive Division	Operational	Burlington Northern, Wisconsin Central Ltd.
30		Diesel	RS1325	1960	Electro-Motive Division	Operational	Chicago & Illinois Midland Railway, Atlantic and Western Railway
104C		Diesel-Electric	FP7A	1952	Electro-Motive Division	Display	Milwaukee Road

=== Electric locomotives ===
Electric locomotive details (Note: Attributed to multiple sources:)
Number	Image	Type	Built	Builder	Status	Previous owner(s)
945		AEM-7	1982	Electro-Motive Division	Display	Amtrak
803		Little Joe	1949	GE Transportation	Operational	Chicago South Shore and South Bend Railroad
4601		E33	1956	GE Transportation	Display	Railroad Museum of New England
4715		S-2	1996	GE Transportation	Display	Conrail
4927		GG1	1942	Altoona Works	Display	Amtrak
431		Interurban Coach	1927	Cincinnati Car Company	Operational	Chicago Aurora and Elgin Railroad
409		Interurban Coach	1923	Pullman Car Company	Operational	Trolleyville USA, Chicago Aurora & Elgin
460		Interurban Coach	1945	St. Louis Car Company	Operational	Trolleyville USA, Chicago Aurora & Elgin
451		Interurban Coach	1945	St. Louis Car Company	Under restoration	Trolleyville USA, Chicago Aurora & Elgin
453		Interurban Coach	1945	St. Louis Car Company	Under restoration	Trolleyville USA, Electric City Trolley Museum, Chicago Aurora & Elgin
36		Interurban Coach	1902	Stephenson Car Company	Operational	Trolleyville USA, Chicago Aurora & Elgin
308		Interurban Coach	1906	Niles Car Company	Operational	Indiana Museum of Transportation and Communication, Chicago Aurora & Elgin
309		Interurban Coach	1907	Hicks Car Works	Operational	Chicago Aurora and Elgin Railroad
319		Interurban Coach	1914	Jewett Car Company	Operational	Trolleyville USA, Chicago Aurora & Elgin
321		Interurban Car	1914	Jewett Car Company	Display	Chicago Aurora and Elgin Railroad
306		Interurban Coach	1924	St. Louis Car Company	Under restoration	Shaker Heights Rapid Transit, Trolleyville USA, Aurora Elgin & Fox River Electric
160		Interurban Coach	1915	Brill Car Company	Operational	Chicago North Shore and Milwaukee Railroad
205		Streetcar	1927	G. C. Kuhlman Car Company	Display	Yakima Electric Railway Museum
1467		Streetcar	1899	Chicago Union Traction	Display	Electric Railway Historical Society
2843		Streetcar	1903	Chicago Surface Lines	Display	Electric Railway Historical Society
141	framless	Streetcar	1924	McGuire-Cummings Mfg. Company	Operational	Electric Railway Historical Society
460		Streetcar	1908	Pullman Company	Operational	Chicago Transit Authority
144		Streetcar	1998	Pullman Company	Operational	Chicago Transit Authority
4		Streetcar	1895	Pullman Company	Display	Chicago Transit Authority
4001		Streetcar	1934	Pullman-Standard	Display	Electric Railway Historical Society
4223		Streetcar	1946	Pullman-Standard	Under restoration	Greater Cleveland Regional Transit Authority
2846		Streetcar	1907	South Chicago City Railway	Display	Electric Railway Historical Society
1374		Streetcar	1905	St. Louis Car Company	Operational	Electric Railway Historical Society
966		Streetcar	1927	St. Louis Car Company	Display	Milwaukee & Suburban Transport
972		Streetcar	1927	St. Louis Car Company	Display	Milwaukee & Suburban Transport
354		Streetcar	1928	St. Louis Car Company	Operational	Chicago Hardware Foundry
3865		Streetcar	1930	St. Louis Car Company	Display	Henry Ford Museum
4021		Streetcar	1936	St. Louis Car Company	Display	Chicago Transit Authority
755		Streetcar	1946	St. Louis Car Company	Display	Southeastern Pennsylvania Transportation Authority
4		Streetcar	1946	St. Louis Car Company	Display	City of Bayonne, NJ
8		Horse Drawn Streetcar	1859	John Stephenson Car Company	Display	Unknown
116		Streetcar	1917	McGuire-Cummings Mfg. Company	Display	Private owner
18		Rapid Transit Car	1914	G.C. Kuhlman Car Company	Operational	Greater Cleveland Regional Transit Authority
172		Interurban Coach	1920	Cincinnati Car Company	Display	Indiana Railway Museum, Anderson Railroad Club, Indiana Museum of Transportation and Communication, Chicago North Shore & Milwaukee
251		Interurban Combine	1917	Jewett Car Company	Operational	Chicago North Shore & Milwaukee
170		Streetcar	1921	American Car Company	Display	Illinois Terminal
483		Streetcar	1913	American Car Company	Display	Unknown
253		Interurban Combine	1917	Jewett Car Company	Display	Chicago North Shore and Milwaukee Railroad
714		Interurban Coach	1926	Cincinnati Car Company	Operational	Chicago North Shore and Milwaukee Railroad
749		Interurban Coach	1928	Pullman Car Company	Operational	Chicago North Shore and Milwaukee Railroad
757		Interurban Coach	1930	Standard Steel Car Company	Operational	Wisconsin Electric Railway Historical Society, Chicago North Shore and Milwaukee Railroad
763		Interurban Coach	1930	Standard Steel Car Company	Display	Wisconsin Electric Railway Historical Society, Chicago North Shore and Milwaukee Railroad
504		Interurban Coach	1910	American Car and Foundry Company	Display	Private owner
101		Interurban Coach	1917	American Car Company	Operational	Illinois Terminal
504		Interurban Coach	1906	Cincinnati Car Company	Display	Private owner
68		Interurban Coach	1918	Cincinnati Car Company	Operational	Ozark Mountain Railroad
172		Interurban Coach	1920	Cincinnati Car Company	Display	Indiana Museum of Transportation
251		Interurban Coach	1917	Jewett Car Company	Operational	Chicago North Shore and Milwaukee Railroad
321		Interurban Coach	1914	Jewett Car Company	Display	Chicago Aurora and Elgin Railroad
50		Interurban Coach	1904	Laconia Car Company	Display	Private owner
58		Interurban Coach	1904	Laconia Car Company	Display	Private owner
150		Interurban Coach	1906	Niles Car and Manufacturing Company	Display	Station Square, Pittsburgh, PA
8		Interurban Coach	Pullman-Standard	1926	Display	Chicago South Shore and South Bend
65		Interurban Coach	1931	Pullman-Standard	Operational	Cedar Rapids and Iowa City Railway
19		Interurban Coach	1926	Pullman-Standard	Display	National Park Service
233		Interurban Coach	1906	St. Louis Car Company	Display	Illini Railroad Club
28		Interurban Coach	1913	St. Louis Car Company	Under restoration	Private owner
277		Interurban Coach	1913	St. Louis Car Company	Operational	Illinois Terminal
91		Interurban Coach	1924	St. Louis Car Company	Display	Private owner
1129		Interurban Coach	1924	The Milwaukee Electric Railway and Light Company	Display	London and Port Stanley Railway
1136		Interurban Coach	1924	The Milwaukee Electric Railway and Light Company	Display	London and Port Stanley Railway
801-802 (Electroliner)		Interurban Four-Section Articulated Streamliner	1941	St. Louis Car Company	Under restoration	Philadelphia Suburban Transportation, Chicago North Shore and Milwaukee Railroad
19		Interurban Coach	1928	Pullman Car Company	Display	National Park Service, Chicago South Shore & South Bend
28		Interurban Coach	1929	Standard Steel Car Company	Display	Wisconsin Electric Railway Historical Society, Chicago South Shore & South Bend
34		Interurban Coach	1929	Standard Steel Car Company	Operational	Chicago South Shore and South Bend Railroad
40		Interurban Coach	1929	Standard Steel Car Company	Operational	National Park Service, Chicago South Shore and South Bend Railroad
8		Interurban Coach	1926	Pullman Car Company	Display	Chicago South Shore and South Bend Railroad
101		Interurban Center-Entrance Coach	1917	American Car Company	Operational	Illinois Terminal
9020		Streetcar Trailer	1921	J.G. Brill Car Company	Display	Electric Railway Historical Society
233		Interurban Office Car	1906	St. Louis Car Company	Display	Illini Railroad Club, Illinois Terminal
1565		Boxcab	1910	Illinois Traction System	Operational	Illinois Power Company
1889		Streetcar	1912	Cia de Transporte Colectivos	Display	Electric City Trolley Museum
277		Interurban Combine	1913	St. Louis Car Company	Operational	Illinois Terminal
209		Streetcar	1914	Chicago Surface Lines	Display	Chicago Transit Authority
415		Interurban Coach/Streetcar	1924	St. Louis Car Company	Operational	Illinois Terminal
3142		Interurban Coach/Streetcar	1923	J. G. Brill Company	Operational	Electric Railway Historical Society
4391		PCC streetcar	1948	St. Louis Car Company	Operational	Electric Railway Historical Society
504		Interurban Sleeper	1910	American Car and Foundry Company	Display	Illinois Terminal
518		Interurban Trailer	1911	St. Louis Car Company	Operational	Illini Railroad Club, Illinois Terminal
65		Light Interurban Coach	1931	Pullman Car Company	Operational	Indiana Railroad, Cedar Rapids & Iowa City
170		Streetcar	1921	American Car Company	Display	Illinois Terminal
63		PCC streetcar	1947	St. Louis Car Company	Display	Lake Shore Electric Railway
19		Streetcar	1914	J.G. Brill Car Company	Operational	Lake Shore Electric Railway
209		Streetcar	1930	Chicago Surface Lines	Display	Chicago Transit Authority
22		1-50 Series	1959	St. Louis Car Company	Operational	Historic ‘L’ Car Society
30		1-50 Series	1959	St. Louis Car Company	Display	Chicago Transit Authority
41		1-50 Series	1959	St. Louis Car Company	Operational	Chicago Transit Authority
2153		2000 Series	1964	Pullman-Standard	Operational	Chicago Transit Authority
2154		2000 Series	1964	Pullman-Standard	Operational	Chicago Transit Authority
1198		Railroad-Roof Steel Commuter Coach	1926	Pullman-Standard	Operational	Illinois Central Railroad
1380		Railroad-Roof Steel Commuter Coach	1926	Pullman-Standard	Operational	Illinois Central Railroad
6125		Rapid Transit Car	1951	St. Louis Car Company	Display	Chicago Transit Authority
6126		Rapid Transit Car	1951	St. Louis Car Company	Display	Chicago Transit Authority
6461		Rapid Transit Car	1955	St. Louis Car Company	Display	Chicago Transit Authority
6462		Rapid Transit Car	1955	St. Louis Car Company	Display	Chicago Transit Authority
6655		Rapid Transit Car	1957	St. Louis Car Company	Operational	Chicago Transit Authority
6656		Rapid Transit Car	1957	St. Louis Car Company	Operational	Chicago Transit Authority
4146		Rapid Transit Car	1915	Cincinnati Car Company	Operational	Chicago Transit Authority
4290		4000-series	1922	Cincinnati Car Company	Operational	Chicago Transit Authority
4321		4000-series	1922	Cincinnati Car Company	Display	Chicago Transit Authority
4410		4000-series	1924	Cincinnati Car Company	Operational	Chicago Transit Authority
4412		4000-series	1924	Cincinnati Car Company	Operational	Chicago Transit Authority
2872		Rapid Transit Car	1906	Pullman-Standard	Display	Chicago Transit Authority
2888		Rapid Transit Car	1906	Pullman-Standard	Display	Chicago Transit Authority
24		Railroad-Roof Wood Gate Car	1898	Pullman Company	Operational	Northwestern Elevated, Chicago Rapid Transit, Chicago Transit Authority
55		B-1	1927	J. G. Brill Company	Operational	SEPTA
7926		R28	1961	American Car and Foundry Company	Display	New York City Transit Authority
7927		R28	1961	American Car and Foundry Company	Display	New York City Transit Authority
2243		2200 series	1969	Budd Company	Operational	Chicago Transit Authority
2244		2200 series	1969	Budd Company	Operational	Chicago Transit Authority
2433		2400 series	1977	Boeing-Vertol	Operational	Chicago Transit Authority
2434		2400 series	1977	Boeing-Vertol	Operational	Chicago Transit Authority
1268		Rapid Transit Car	1907	American Car and Foundry Company	Operational	Chicago Hardware Foundry
1797		Rapid Transit Car	1907	American Car and Foundry Company	Operational	Chicago Hardware Foundry
1808		Rapid Transit Car	1907	American Car and Foundry Company	Operational	Chicago Hardware Foundry
1754		Rapid Transit Car	1906	Jewett Car Company	Operational	Chicago Elevated Railway, Chicago Transit Authority
4034		Streetcar/CLRV	1979	Hawker-Siddely Canada Ltd	Operational	Toronto Transit Commission
1268		Rapid Transit Trailer	1907	American Car and Foundry Company	Operational	Chicago Rapid Transit Company, Chicago Transit Authority
2871		2600 series	1984	Budd	Operational	Chicago Transit Authority
2872		2600 series	1984	Budd	Operational	Chiago Trainsit Authority
1500-1600 series		Bi level Highliner EMU	1971-1972	St. Louis Car Company	Operational	Metra Electric
4715		S-Motor	1906	Alco/GE	Display	Conrail
4		Steeplecab	1911	Alco/GE	Operational	Commonwealth Edison
S105		Steeplecab	1920	Baldwin Westinghouse	Display	East Troy Electric Railroad
14		B1	1929	Baldwin Westinghouse	Display	Cornwall Transit
1		Steeplecab	1923	General Electric	Display	East Troy Electric Railroad
4601		E-33	1956	General Electric	Display	Railroad Museum of New England
1565		Boxcab	1910	Illinois Traction System	Operational	Illinois Power Company
300		Steeplecab Freight Locomotive	1915	McGuire-Cummings Manufacturing Company	Operational	Iowa Traction Railway
L3		Steeplecab	1920	The Milwaukee Electric Railway and Light Company	Display	Private owner in East Troy, WI
L4		Steeplecab	1920	The Milwaukee Electric Railway and Light Company	Display	Private owner in East Troy, WI
L7		Steeplecab	1931	The Milwaukee Electric Railway and Light Company	Display	The Wisconsin Electric Railway Historical Society
L10		Steeplecab	1944	The Milwaukee Electric Railway and Light Company	Display	Wisconsin Electric Power Company
213		Double-truck Wood Freight Motor	1919	Cincinnati Car Company	Display	Chicago Hardware Foundry
218		Double-truck Wood Freight Motor	1922	Cincinnati Car Company	Display	Chicago North Shore and Milwaukee Railroad
229		Double-truck Wood Freight Motor	1922	Cincinnati Car Company	Operational	Chicago North Shore and Milwaukee Railroad
640		Double-truck Wood Freight Motor	1930	Cincinnati Car Company	Display	Waterfront Electric Railway
M15		Double-truck Steel Freight Motor	1920	The Milwaukee Electric Railway and Light Company	Operational	Municipality of East Troy Railroad
M1		Double-truck Steel Freight Motor	1917	The Milwaukee Electric Railway and Light Company	Display	The Wisconsin Electric Railway Historical Society
D16		Double-truck Locomotive Crane	1923	Brown Hoisting Machinery Company	Display	The Wisconsin Electric Railway Historical Society
604		Double-truck Line Car	1914	Chicago & Milwaukee Electric	Display	Chicago North Shore and Milwaukee Railroad
F305		Double-truck Snow Plow	1930	Chicago Surface Lines	Display	Electric Railway Historical Society
X4		Double-truck Cab-on-Flat Crane	1946	Chicago Surface Lines	Display	Electric Railway Historical Society
D13		Double-truck Side Dump Motor	1920	Differential Car Company	Operational	The Wisconsin Electric Railway Historical Society
1702		Double-truck Side Dump Motor	1922	Illinois Traction System	Operational	Illinois Terminal
E228		Single-truck Snow Sweeper	1908	McGuire-Cummings Mfg. Company	Display	Chicago Transit Authority
M26		Double-truck Electric Motor	1903	St. Louis Car Company	Display	The Wisconsin Electric Railway Historical Society
1100		Double-truck Line Car	1925	St. Louis Car Company	Operational	Line Car Preservation Partnership
D22		Double-truck Line Car	1907	The Milwaukee Electric Railway and Light Company	Display	The Wisconsin Electric Railway Historical Society
12		Double-truck Portable Substation	1926	The Milwaukee Electric Railway and Light Company	Display	Unknown
B48		Double-truck Snow Sweeper	1926	The Milwaukee Electric Railway and Light Company	Display	The Wisconsin Electric Railway Historical Society
9933		RDC-1	1959	Budd Mfg. Company	Operational	Unknown
M35		Gas-Electric Coach	1927	Electro-Motive Corporation	Under restoration	Stuhr Museum of the Prairie Pioneer

=== Rolling stock ===
Rolling stock details (Note: Attributed to multiple sources:)
Number / Name	Image	Type	Built	Builder	Status	Previous owner(s)
907853		Fuel Tender	1937	American Locomotive Company	Display	Union Pacific Railroad
234		Interurban Observation car	1910	Danville Car Company	Operational	Illini Railroad Club, Illinois Terminal
84		Coach	1911	American Car and Foundry Company	Operational	Marquette and Huron Mountain Railroad
1923		Baggage car	1914	American Car and Foundry Company	Operational	Unknown
109		Coach	1915	American Car and Foundry Company	Under restoration	Marquette and Huron Mountain Railroad
7700		Combine car	1911	American Car and Foundry Company	Operational	Unknown
8728		Baggage car	1923	American Car and Foundry Company	Display	Unknown
1554		Baggage car	1927	American Car and Foundry Company	Under restoration	Unknown
2726		Dining car	1930	American Car and Foundry Company	Operational	Unknown
3345		Coach	1948	American Car and Foundry Company	Under restoration	City of Delavan, Wisconsin
960		Coach	1936	Budd Company	Operational	Unknown
4626		Coach	1936	Budd Company	Operational	Unknown
4627		Coach	1936	Budd Company	Operational	Unknown
150		Dining car	1936	Budd Company	Operational	Unknown
225		Observation car	1936	Budd Company	Operational	Unknown
1108		Coach	1948	Budd Company	Under restoration	Grand Canyon Railway
801		Baggage car	1948	Budd Company	Display	Private owner
1432		Sleeper car	1959	Budd Company	Operational	Unknown
493		Sleeper car	1956	Budd Company	Operational	Unknown
325		Sleeper car	1959	Budd Company	Operational	Unknown
7128		Coach	1928	Aurora Shops	Display	Unknown
993		Baggage car	1951	Chicago, Burlington and Quincy Railroad	Display	Gateaway Rail Services
2002		Sleeper car	1950	Canadian Car and Foundry	Display	Unknown
T8		Baggage/Trailer	1908	McKeen	Display	Unknown
1307		Baggage car	1938	Milwaukee Road	Display	Unknown
542		Coach	1947	Milwaukee Road	Display	Unknown
649		Baggage car	1947	Milwaukee Road	Under restoration	Unknown
126		Dining car	1948	Milwaukee Road	Display	Unknown
2050		Baggage car	1954	Milwaukee Road	Display	Unknown
9695		Post Office car	1914	Pressed Steel Car Company	Display	Unknown
25		Combine car	1925	Pressed Steel Car Company	Operational	Unknown
4061		Combine car	1914	Pressed Steel Car Company	Display	Unknown
101		Private car	1889	Pullman-Standard	Display	North American Car
1304		Baggage car	1901	Pullman-Standard	Display	Unknown
57		Coach	1905	Pullman-Standard	Display	Soo Line Railroad
99		Private car	1905	Pullman-Standard	Display	Unknown
1094		Dining-Cafe car	1906	Pullman-Standard	Display	Boston and Maine Railroad
3285		Dining car	1907	Pullman-Standard	Display	Boston and Maine Railroad
1459		Baggage car	1910	Pullman-Standard	Display	Monticello and Sangamon Valley, Monticello, Illinois
8609		Baggage car	1910	Pullman-Standard	Display	Unknown
Inglehome		Lounge\Observation car	1910	Pullman-Standard	Operational	Illini Railroad Club
Villa Real		Sleeper car	1911	Pullman-Standard	Operational	Private owner in Raleigh, North Carolina
5316		Coach	1912	Pullman-Standard	Display	Unknown
Villa Falls		Sleeper car	1913	Pullman-Standard	Display	Unknown
556		Coach	1914	Pullman-Standard	Operational	Unknown
561		Coach	1914	Pullman-Standard	Operational	Unknown
567		Coach	1914	Pullman-Standard	Operational	Unknown
1534		Lounge/Crew Dormitory	1914	Pullman-Standard	Display	Unknown
8784		Baggage car	1915	Pullman-Standard	Display	Unknown
Lake City		Observation car	1915	Pullman-Standard	Display	Unknown
3996		Dining car	1916	Pullman-Standard	Display	Keokuk Junction Railway
Mt. Harvard		Sleeper car	1923	Pullman-Standard	Display	Unknown
1		Exhibit car	1924	Pullman-Standard	Display	Artrain
Dover Strait		Sleeper/Lounge car	1924	Pullman-Standard	Operational	Elgin Joliet and Eastern Railroad
2804		Coach	1925	Pullman-Standard	Operational	Unknown
Glen Alta		Sleeper car	1925	Pullman-Standard	Display	Unknown
Glen Springs		Sleeper car	1925	Pullman-Standard	Display	Unknown
2544		Combine car	1927	Pullman-Standard	Operational	Unknown
6166		Coach	1927	Pullman-Standard	Display	Unknown
501		Chair car	1928	Pullman-Standard	Display	Missouri Central Railroad
Floyd River		Sleeper car	1928	Pullman-Standard	Display	Chicago and North Western Railroad
John McLoughlin		Sleeper car	1929	Pullman-Standard	Under restoration	Keokuk Junction Railway
John Greenleaf Whitter		Sleeper car	1929	Pullman-Standard	Under restoration	San Luis and Rio Grande Railroad
Palm Lane		Observation car	1929	Pullman-Standard	Display	Iowa Pacific, Alamosa, Union, Illinois
Pawnee		Observation car	1930	Pullman-Standard	Operational	John Blair
X250398		Baggage/Mail car	1936	Pullman-Standard	Display	Chicago and North Western Railroad
X300902		Baggage/Tap Room car	1936	Pullman-Standard	Display	Unknown
8089		Sleeper car	1940	Pullman-Standard	Display	Golden Arrow Tours
7271		Sleeper car	1943	Pullman-Standard	Display	Unknown
8726		Sleeper car	1943	Pullman-Standard	Display	Unknown
3		Exhibit car	1950	Pullman-Standard	Display	Unknown
King Cotton		Sleeper car	1942	Pullman-Standard	Display	Unknown
10		Private car	1948	Pullman-Standard	Display	Unknown
481		Sleeper car	1948	Pullman-Standard	Display	Unknown
8202		Post Office/Baggage car	1950	Pullman-Standard	Display	Unknown
Birmingham		Dining car	1950	Pullman-Standard	Operational	Private owner in Lansing, Illinois
7658		Bilevel rail car	1956	Pullman-Standard	Operational	Metra
151		Bilevel rail car	1960	Pullman-Standard	Operational	Metra
7716		Bilevel rail car	1960	Pullman-Standard	Operational	Hocking Valley Scenic Railway
83		Bilevel rail car	1961	Pullman-Standard	Operational	Hocking Valley Scenic Railway
203		Baggage car	1963	Pullman-Standard	Display	Unknown
1		Bilevel rail car	1955	St. Louis Car Company	Operational	Unknown
6		Bilevel rail car	1955	St. Louis Car Company	Operational	Unknown
791		Bilevel Rail Car	1965	Budd Company	Operational, to be restored	Chicago, Burlington and Quincy Railroad, Metra, MiTrain
702		Bilevel Rail Car	1950	Budd Company	Operational, to be restored	Chicago, Burlington and Quincy Railroad, Metra, MiTrain
709		Bilevel Rail Car	1950	Budd Company	Operational, to be restored	Chicago, Burlington and Quincy Railroad, Metra, MiTrain
2524		Coach	1922	Standard Steel Car Company	Operational	Unknown
2555		Coach	1927	Standard Steel Car Company	Operational	Unknown
2571		Coach	1927	Standard Steel Car Company	Operational	Des Moines and Raccoon Valley Railway Museum
2582		Coach	1927	Standard Steel Car Company	Operational	Unknown
2602		Coach	1929	Standard Steel Car Company	Operational	Unknown
2612		Coach	1929	Standard Steel Car Company	Operational	Unknown
M37		Double-truck steel container car	1931	The Milwaukee Electric Railway and Light Company	Operational	Unknown
E117		Double-truck flat car	Unknown	Unknown	Display	Unknown
F208		Double-truck side dump trailer	1921	Differential Car Company	Display	Unknown
S309		Double-truck flat car	1953	Chicago Transit Authority	Display	Chicago Transit Authority
504		Double-truck steel freight trailer	1925	St. Louis Car Company	Display	Chicago South Shore and South Bend Railroad
109		Double-truck flat car	1915	Wisconsin Power & Light	Display	Unknown
810		Double-truck wood freight trailer	1924	Kuhlman Car Company	Operational	Private owner
1502		Double-truck piggyback flat car	1926	Standard Steel Car Company	Display	Unknown
E58		Double-truck flat car	1907	The Milwaukee Electric Railway and Light Company	Display	Unknown
204738		Scale Test car	1916	American Car and Foundry Company	Under restoration	Unknown
X250958		Idler Flat car	1928	American Car and Foundry Company	Display	Unknown
258140		Idler Flat car	1930	American Car and Foundry Company	Operational	Unknown
759		Tender	1924	American Locomotive Company	Display	Unknown
85451		Water car/Tender	1941	American Locomotive Company	Display	Private owner in Maywood, IL
6323A		Tender	1941	Baldwin Locomotive Works	Display	Unknown
6363		160-ton Diesel Wrecker	1925	Bucyrus	Operational	Chicago and North Western Railway
X201		Rail Test car	1936	Buda	Display	Unknown
X202		Rail Test car	1940	Buda	Display	Unknown
W4150		Auxiliary water car/Tender	Unknown	Unknown	Operational	Unknown
RC50359		Crane	Unknown	Burro	Display	Unknown
A58701		Crane	Unknown	Burro	Operational	Unknown
RC51187		Crane	1947	Burro	Display	Unknown
1904		Idler Flat car	1915	Chicago and Western Indiana Railroad	Display	Unknown
1772		Idler Flat car	1940	Chicago and Western Indiana Railroad	Operational	Unknown
1900		100-ton Steam Wrecker	1906	Industrial Works	Display	Unknown
X261709		Pile Driver	1929	Industrial Works	Display	Chicago and North Western Railway
19		Locomotive Crane	1951	Industrial Brownhoist	Operational	Unknown
900075		Steam Rotary Snow Plow	1940	Lima Locomotive Works	Display	Union Pacific Railroad
X5000		Dynamometer car	1929	Milwaukee Road	Operational	Unknown
262051		40-ton Locomotive Crane	1976	Ohio Locomotive Crane Company	Operational	Union Pacific Railroad
X117		Camp car	Unknown	Pullman-Standard	Display	Unknown
W52		Idler Flat car	1936	Pullman-Standard	Operational	Chicago and North Western Railway
X38		Snow Plow	1936	Russell	Operational	Unknown
8852002		Car Mover	1985	Pettibone	Display	Unknown
44043		Boxcar	1910	American Car and Foundry Company	Display	Atchison, Topeka and Santa Fe Railway
943		Refrigerator Boxcar	1910	American Car and Foundry Company	Display	Indianapolis Transportation Museum
9499		Tanker car	1912	American Car and Foundry Company	Operational	Unknown
33096		Boxcar	1913	American Car and Foundry Company	Display	Unknown
131650		Boxcar	1914	American Car and Foundry Company	Display	Unknown
101		Tanker car	1917	American Car and Foundry Company	Operational	Unknown
1277		Tanker car	1918	American Car and Foundry Company	Operational	Unknown
1400		Caboose	1923	American Car and Foundry Company	Display	Unknown
1002		Caboose	1926	American Car and Foundry Company	Display	Unknown
1003		Caboose	1926	American Car and Foundry Company	Display	Unknown
65		Caboose	1927	American Car and Foundry Company	Display	Unknown
220100		Hopper car	1927	American Car and Foundry Company	Operational	Chicago, Burlington and Quincy Railroad
220145		Hopper car	1927	American Car and Foundry Company	Operational	Chicago, Burlington and Quincy Railroad
10304		Caboose	1928	American Car and Foundry Company	Operational	Unknown
220100		Tanker car	1935	American Car and Foundry Company	Operational	Unknown
17222		Tanker car	1937	American Car and Foundry Company	Operational	Unknown
X1390		Tanker car	1956	American Car and Foundry Company	Operational	Unknown
97054		Hopper car	1958	American Car and Foundry Company	Operational	Unknown
374065		Boxcar	1922	Baltimore and Ohio Railroad	Display	Unknown
37022		Hopper car	1973	Bethlehem Steel	Operational	California State Railroad Museum
498136		Flatcar	Unknown	Unknown	Display	Unknown
223		Caboose	1953	Unknown	Operational	Unknown
10494		Caboose	1915	Chicago and North Western Railroad	Display	Unknown
14073		Caboose	1891	Chicago, Burlington and Quincy Railroad	Display	Unknown
17598		Boxcar	1950	Chicago, Burlington and Quincy Railroad	Display	BNSF Railway
470902		Flatcar	1955	Chicago, Burlington and Quincy Railroad	Display	Trailer Train
13572		Caboose	1960	Chicago, Burlington and Quincy Railroad	Operational	Unknown
5402		Boxcar	1948	Chicago Freight Car Company	Display	Unknown
5418		Boxcar	1948	Chicago Freight Car Company	Display	Unknown
5402		Boxcar	1948	Chicago Freight Car Company	Display	Unknown
5426		Boxcar	1948	Chicago Freight Car Company	Display	Unknown
5402		Boxcar	1948	Chicago Freight Car Company	Display	Unknown
4534		Boxcar	1948	Chicago Freight Car Company	Display	Unknown
4584		Boxcar	1948	Chicago Freight Car Company	Display	Unknown
4403		Boxcar	1952	Chicago Freight Car Company	Display	Unknown
4410		Boxcar	1962	Chicago Freight Car Company	Display	Unknown
93006		Flatcar	1956	Unknown	Operational	Unknown
19135		Caboose	1965	Chicago, Rock Island and Pacific Railroad	Operational	Unknown
11039		Boxcar	1978	Evans	Display	Unknown
93006		Flatcar	1956	Unknown	Operational	Unknown
55407		Refrigerator Boxcar	1924	FGEX	Display	Unknown
791126		Hopper car	1966	FMC	Operational	Unknown
75470		Tanker car	1960	General American Transportation	Operational	Unknown
2034		Boxcar	1931	General American Transportation	Display	Unknown
26640		Boxcar	1931	General American Transportation	Operational	Unknown
77307		Refrigerator Boxcar	1931	General American Transportation	Display	Unknown
33519		Tanker car	1941	General American Transportation	Display	Unknown
100641		Milk car	1946	General American Transportation	Display	Illinois Central Railroad
1021		Milk car	1947	General American Transportation	Display	Unknown
37109		Refrigerator boxcar	1948	General American Transportation	Display	Unknown
37241		Refrigerator boxcar	1948	General American Transportation	Display	Unknown
37312		Refrigerator boxcar	1948	General American Transportation	Display	Unknown
75524		Refrigerator boxcar	1950	General American Transportation	Display	Unknown
12661		Tanker car	1952	General American Transportation	Operational	Unknown
15030		Refrigerator boxcar	1954	General American Transportation	Display	Unknown
25004		Refrigerator boxcar	1954	General American Transportation	Display	Unknown
25029		Refrigerator boxcar	General American Transportation	1954	Display	Unknown
25041		Refrigerator boxcar	1954	General American Transportation	Display	Unknown
66216		Refrigerator boxcar	1954	General American Transportation	Display	Unknown
66221		Refrigerator boxcar	1954	General American Transportation	Display	Unknown
66234		Refrigerator boxcar	1954	General American Transportation	Display	Unknown
66244		Refrigerator boxcar	1948	General American Transportation	Display	Unknown
68229		Refrigerator boxcar	1954	General American Transportation	Display	Unknown
15802		Refrigerator boxcar	1956	General American Transportation	Display	Unknown
15833		Refrigerator boxcar	1956	General American Transportation	Display	Unknown
3		Refrigerator boxcar	1957	General American Transportation	Display	Unknown
77952		Caboose	1956	Grand Trunk Railway	Display	Unknown
X201775		Hopper car	1946	Greenville Steel Car	Operational	Unknown
110509		Hopper car	1969	Greenville Steel Car	Operational	Unknown
15002		Flatcar	1934	General Steel Casting	Operational	Unknown
3762		Gondola car	1965	Gunderson Bros. Engineering Company	Operational	Unknown
909		Boxcar	1966	Gunderson Bros. Engineering Company	Operational	Unknown
1185		Side Dump car	1913	Haskell and Barker	Display	Unknown
9792		Caboose	1940	Illinois Central Railroad	Display	Unknown
529		Caboose	1956	Immigration, Refugees and Citizenship Canada	Display	Unknown
199458		Caboose	1970	International Car Company	Operational	Unknown
38488		Flatcar	1970	Magor	Operational	Unknown
520		Milk car	1935	Merchants Despatch Transportation Company	Operational	Unknown
X5001		Flatcar	1929	Milwaukee Road	Operational	Chicago Milwaukee St. Paul and Pacific Railroad
19331		Boxcar	1935	Milwaukee Road	Display	Unknown
01984		Caboose	1946	Milwaukee Road	Operational	Unknown
3786		Caboose	1942	Mt. Vernon	Operational	Unknown
40285		Boxcar	1929	Mt. Vernon	Display	Unknown
20519		Boxcar	1927	North American Car Company	Display	Unknown
49444		Boxcar	1921	Pacific Car and Foundry Company	Display	Unknown
992300		Caboose	1975	Pacific Car and Foundry Company	Display	Unknown
60394		Boxcar	1929	Pennsylvania Car Company	Display	Unknown
68428		Boxcar	1928	Pacific Fruit Express	Display	Unknown
499320		Boxcar	1913	Pressed Steel	Display	Unknown
X261497		Flatcar	1946	Pressed Steel	Operational	Chicago and North Western Railroad
476199		Caboose	1906	Pennsylvania Railroad	Display	Unknown
55659		Flatcar	1913	Pullman-Standard	Operational	Unknown
39167		Boxcar	1924	Pullman-Standard	Display	Unknown
41146		Boxcar	1929	Pullman-Standard	Display	Unknown
601		Caboose	1946	Pullman-Standard	Operational	Unknown
39153		Flatcar	1952	Pullman-Standard	Operational	Unknown
5643		Boxcar	1957	Pullman-Standard	Display	Unknown
70104		Caboose	1957	Pullman-Standard	Operational	Unknown
161795		Boxcar	1969	Pullman-Standard	Display	Unknown
503		Boxcar	1979	Pullman-Standard	Display	Unknown
767253		Hopper car	1980	Pullman-Standard	Operational	Unknown
988		Caboose	1953	St. Louis Car Company	Display	Unknown
264070		Boxcar	1930	Standard Steel	Operational	Unknown
3049		Boxcar	1971	Thrall Car Manufacturer Company	Display	Unknown
20306		Boxcar	1971	Thrall Car Manufacturer Company	Display	Unknown
100000		Boxcar	1906	Union Pacific Railroad	Display	Union Pacific Railroad
907149		Boxcar	1906	Union Pacific Railroad	Display	Union Pacific Railroad
21491		Boxcar	1975	Pullman-Standard	Awaiting restoration	TTX Company
39		Side Dump car	1930	Western Wheeled Scraper	Operational	Unknown

=== Two-Foot Gauge equipment ===
Two-Foot Gauge details
Number	Image	Type	Built	Builder	Status	Previous owner(s)
508		Single-End Single-Truck Tunnel Locomotive	1908	Baldwin-Westinghouse	Display	Chicago Tunnel Company
653		Ash car	1906	Kilbourne and Jacobs Manufacturing Co.	Display	Chicago Tunnel Company
714		Ash car	1929	Kilbourne and Jacobs Manufacturing Co.	Display	Chicago Tunnel Company
766		Ash car	1929	Kilbourne and Jacobs Manufacturing Co.	Display	Chicago Tunnel Company
856		Ash car	1930	Kilbourne and Jacobs Manufacturing Co.	Display	Chicago Tunnel Company
K&J?		Flatcar	Unknown	Kilbourne and Jacobs Manufacturing Co.	Display	Chicago Tunnel Company
K&J?		Flatcar	Unknown	Kilbourne and Jacobs Manufacturing Co.	Display	Chicago Tunnel Company

=== Motor and trolley busses ===
Bus details
Number	Image	Model	Built	Builder	Status	Previous owner(s)
11		31S	1941	American Car and Foundry Company	Display	Unknown
8715		F2P-401	1963	Flxible	Display	CTA, Chicagoland Historical Bus Museum
3177		F2D6V401-1	1965	Flxible	Operational	CTA
17		99T	1944	Ford Motor Company	Operational	Orange Empire Railway Museum
605		TDH5103	1950	General Motors	Operational	CMC, CTA, Fox River Trolley Museum
8006		T6H-4523A	1976	General Motors	Display	RTA, Chicagoland Historical Bus Museum
9799		T8H-5307A	1977	General Motors	Display	CTA, Chicagoland Historical Bus Museum
412		T7W-603	1979	General Motors	Operational	Janesville Transit System
433		D35LF	2001	New Flyer	Operational	Janesville Transit System
3529		Model 40	1932	Twin Coach	Display	National Museum of Transport
3407		Model 798	1932	White Motor Company	Display	Chicago Transit Authority
6163		Metro E	1995	Flxible	Operational	Chicago Transit Authority
6770		LFS	2002	Nova Bus	Operational	Chicago Transit Authority
590		Model 716	1932	Yellow Coach	Under restoration	General Motors Collection
512		Model 743	1939	Yellow Coach	Display	National Museum of Transportation
181		HR150G	1982	BBC	Operational	Edmonton Transit System
568		T40	1934	J. G. Brill Company	Display	National Museum of Transportation
192		T40S	1937	J. G. Brill Company	Display	Chicago Transit Authority
193		T40G	1937	J. G. Brill Company	Display	CTA, Electric Railway Historical Society
239		T40S	1948	ACF-Brill	Display	Des Moines Railway Co, Des Moines Transit Co
84		T40	1930	J. G. Brill Company	Operational	CSL, CTA, Electric Railway Historical Society
2340		T48A	1951	CCF-Brill	Display	BC Hydro Transit, Transit Museum Society
9809		14TrE2	1998	Electric Transit Inc.	Operational	Greater Dayton Regional Transit Authority
614		T48A	1949	Fageol-Twin Coach	Display	MUNI, Orange Empire Railway Museum
906		E-800	1977	New Flyer	Operational	Miami Valley Regional Transit Agency
925		E-800	1977	New Flyer	Operational	Miami Valley Regional Transit Agency
9339		E700A	1972	New Flyer/TCC	Display	Halton County Radial Railway; Toronto trolleybus system
4123		Phantom ETB	2002	Gillig/KCMT	Operational	King County Metro
4020		SG-T310	1987	M-A-N	Operational	King County Metro
441		TC44	1948	Marmon-Herrington	Operational	Milwaukee & Suburban Transport Corporation
9553		TC49	1951	Marmon-Herrington	Operational	Chicago Transit Authority
9631		TC49	1951	Marmon-Herrington	Operational	Chicago Transit Authority
4110		AN440LF-ETB	2003	Neoplan USA	Operational	Massachusetts Bay Transit Authority
656		AN440LF-ETB	1944	Pullman-Standard	Display	Orange Empire Railway Museum
350		44CX	1947	Pullman-Standard	Display	Milwaukee & Suburban Transport
435		44CX	1947	Pullman-Standard	Operational	City Transit, Miami Valley RTA
874		44CX	1949	Pullman-Standard	Display	Omnibus Society of America
269		1711	1941	St. Louis Car Company	Display	Milwaukee & Suburban Transport
633		41GWFT	1940	Twin Coach	Operational	Seattle Transit System, Orange Empire Railway Museum
9763		58DWTT	1948	Twin Coach	Display	Chicago Transit Authority, Glenn Johnson

=== Formerly owned locomotives ===
Locomotive details
Number	Image	Type	Model	Built	Builder	Status	Owner
154		Steam	2-8-0	1909	Baldwin Locomotive Works	Display	The Henry Ford Museum
102		Steam	4-6-0	1923	American Locomotive Company	Display	End-O-Line Railroad Park and Museum
34		Steam	2-8-0	1916	Baldwin Locomotive Works	Under restoration	Western Maryland Scenic Railroad
475		Steam	4-8-0	1906	Baldwin Locomotive Works	Operational	Strasburg Rail Road
2		Steam	2-8-2	1912	Baldwin Locomotive Works	Operational	Albany and Eastern Railroad
91		Diesel	E9	1953	Electro-Motive Diesel	Abandoned and gutted	Unknown

== See also ==
- List of common carrier freight railroads in the United States
- List of Illinois railroads
- List of heritage railroads in the United States
- List of railway museums
