= Elgin and Belvidere Electric Company =

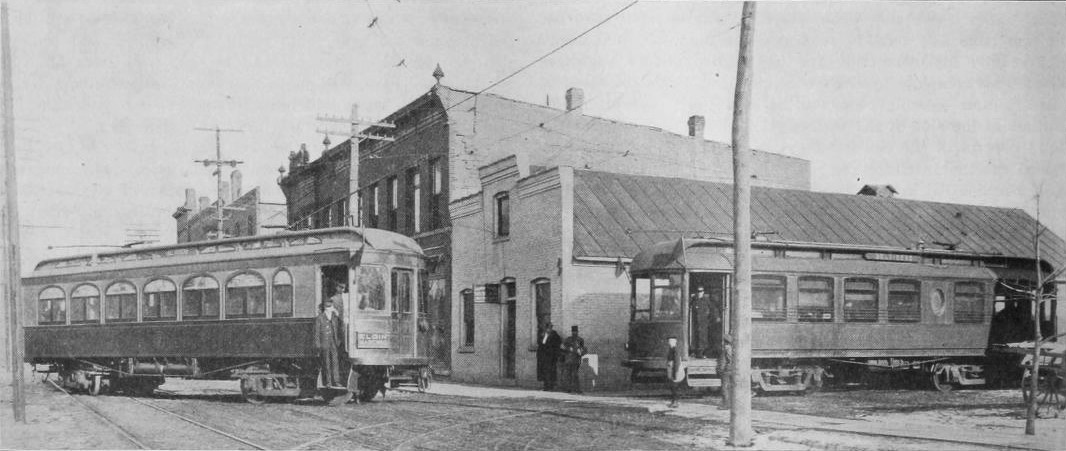
- An Elgin and Belvidere car meets a Rockford and Interurban car at the Belvidere terminal

Overview
- Status: Defunct
- Locale: Fox River Valley
- Termini: Elgin, Illinois; Belvidere and Rockford, Illinois

Service
- Type: Interurban

History
- Opened: February 2, 1907
- Closed: March 10, 1930

Technical
- Line length: 36 miles (58 km)
- Track gauge: 4 ft 8 1/2 in (1,435 mm) standard gauge
- Electrification: Overhead line

The Elgin and Belvidere Electric Company was a 36-mile (58 km) interurban line that connected Belvidere, Illinois and Elgin, Illinois. It was the central link in the interurban network connecting Freeport, Rockford, Elgin, and Chicago which included the Rockford and Interurban Railway to the west and the Chicago, Aurora and Elgin Railroad to the east. The line was operational from 1907 until 1930. In 1927, the line was extended to Rockford over a line of the Rockford and Interurban.

== History ==
The Elgin and Belvidere Electric Company was incorporated March 11, 1905. Bion J. Arnold acquired the railroad after it went into financial difficulties during construction in 1906. His company, The Arnold Company, designed and built the power generating stations and the overhead structure for the railway, and had largely been paid in railway securities. Construction of the line was completed in 1906, however it did not enter service until February 2, 1907.

Arnold used the railroad as a proving ground for pioneering designs; the first automatic substation was on the line at Union and the railroad was one of a handful to use gasoline generators to generate electric power. Its rolling stock consisted of standard wooden interurban cars which typically ran in short one- to three-car trains on hourly intervals. Arnold himself was heavily involved in the line's construction and management, and at one point operated the cars himself during a strike.

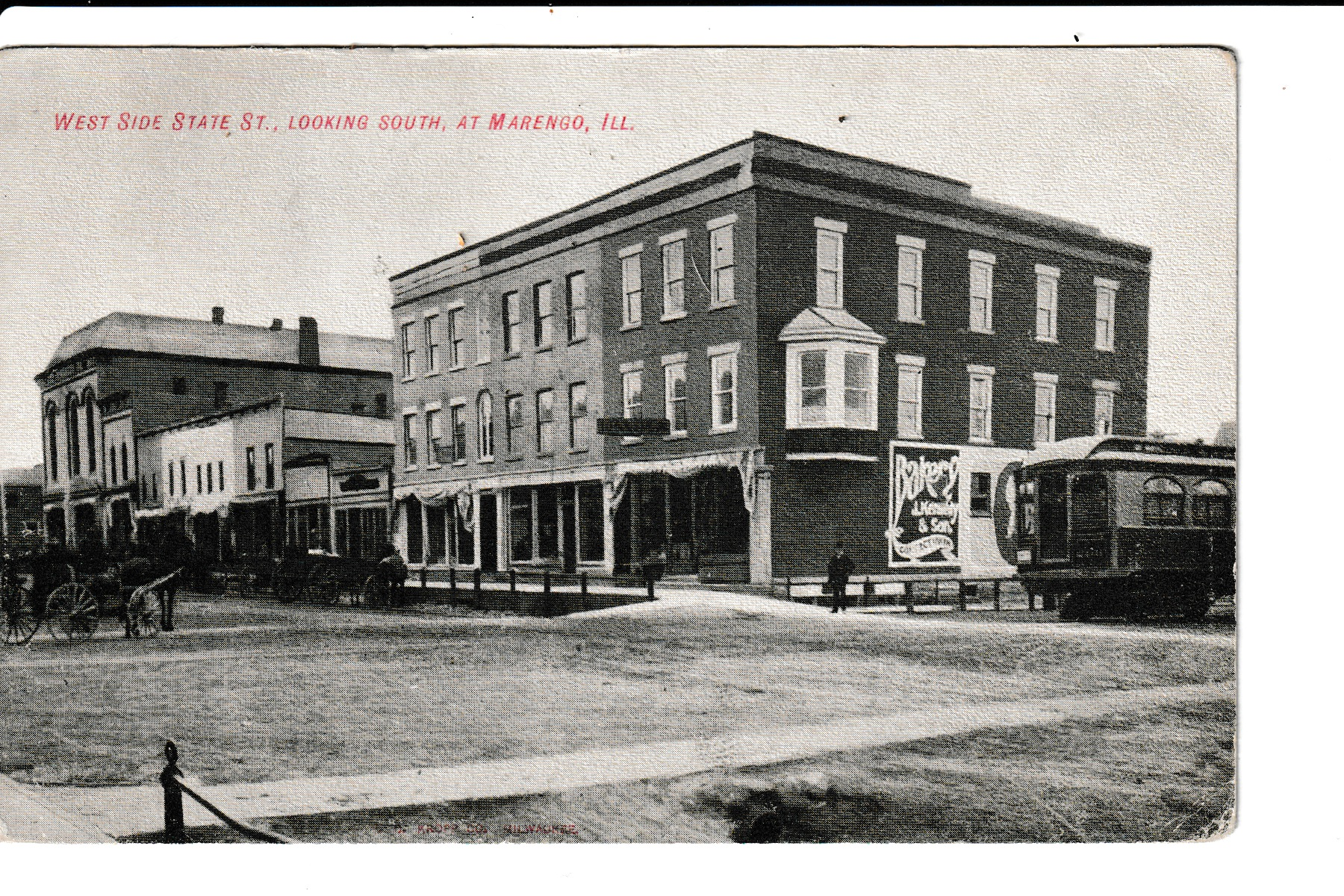
Elgin and belvidere electric railroad interurban streeetcar at marengo, Illinois

On May 1, 1927, the Elgin and Belvidere Electric was sold to Milton Ellis and his associates, owners of the Rockford and Interurban and the local Rockford trolley lines. A new company, the Elgin, Belvidere and Rockford Railway, was formed and the Rockford to Belvidere line of the Rockford and Interurban Railway was transferred to it. Bion Arnold remained as manager and president of the new company.

=== Closing ===
The railroad was never particularly profitable, with a rate of return of about 2% in its best years. On March 10, 1930, the railroad ceased operations due to competition from the parallel Chicago and North Western Railway and from the automobile, after the paving of nearby US 20. For a time the railroad sat moribund, with the cars stored at the shops in Marengo, until Arnold scrapped the line himself in the mid to late 1930s.

== Preservation ==
The Illinois Railway Museum acquired 7 miles (11 km) of the abandoned right of way east of Union in 1956 through a delinquent tax sale. The museum currently operates trains over this section of the line during the summer as part of its demonstration railroad.

The exterior of the interurban rail station at 202 E. State Street in Cherry Valley remains basically intact, and is now home to the administrative offices of the Cherry Valley Fire Protection District.

There is a remaining 350-foot (107 m) concrete arch bridge spanning the Kishwaukee River east of Belvidere. Its preservation seems likely due to sturdy construction and lack of scrap value, making removal unprofitable.

=== Huntley-Union-Marengo Trail ===
In 2006, the McHenry Conservation District opened the first phase of the Huntley-Union-Marengo (H.U.M.) trail along the former right-of-way from Union to Marengo. The trail is eventually planned to connect to Huntley as well, following the former rail right-of-way where possible.
