= Lake Shore Electric Railway (museum) =

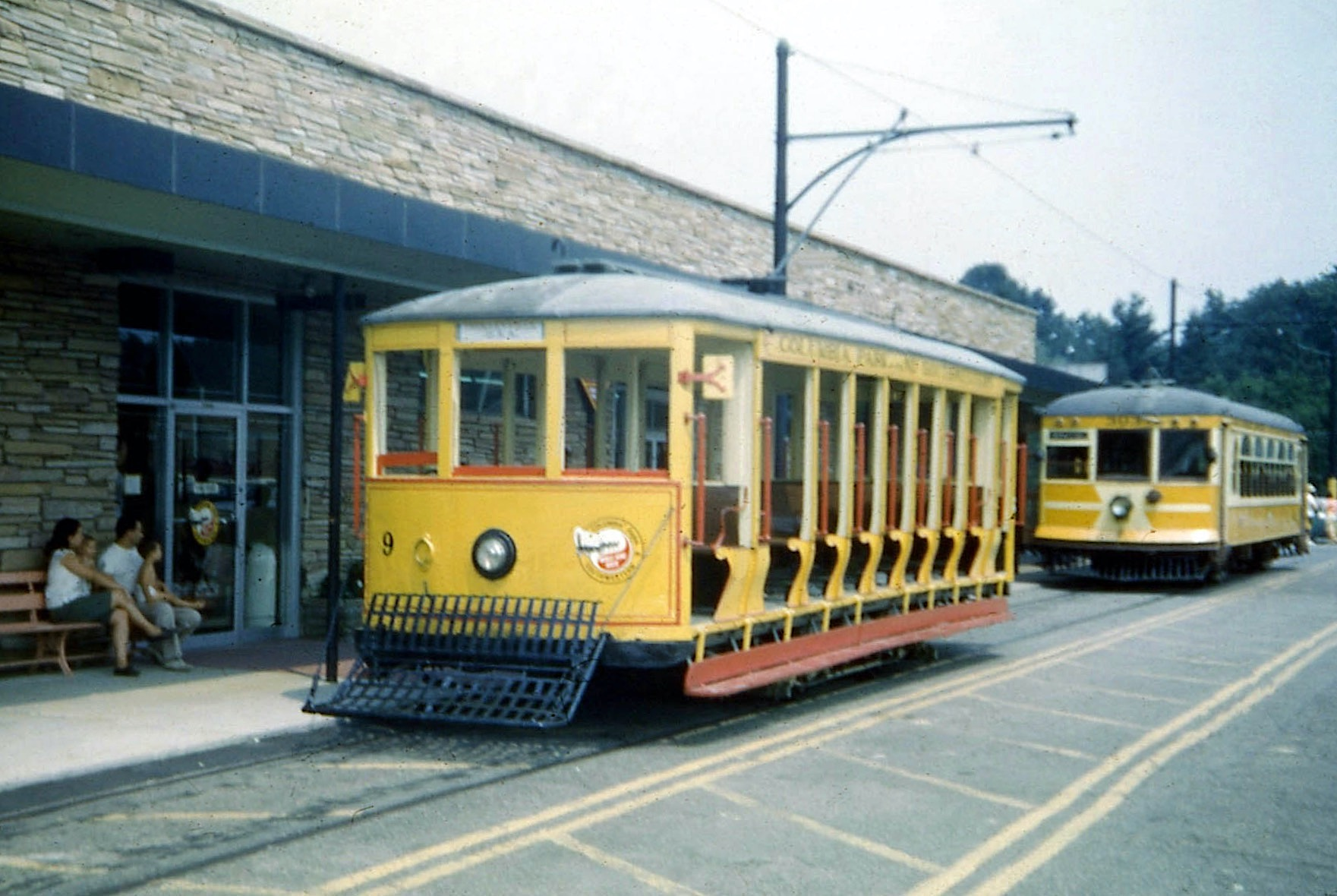
- A streetcar at Trollyville USA in 1966
- Former names: Gerald E. Brookins Museum of Electric Railways, Trolleyville USA
- Location: Cleveland, Ohio
- Type: Railway museum

The Lake Shore Electric Railway was an attempt to start an electric railway museum in Cleveland, Ohio.

The former Trolleyville USA museum (formally known as the Gerald E. Brookins Museum of Electric Railways) in Olmsted Township closed down in 2005. At that time, organizers sought to relocate the museum's collection of 31 trolley cars. In 2006, the collection was moved to Dock 32 of the Port of Cleveland, which is owned by the city and is located just north of Cleveland Browns Stadium and the Great Lakes Science Center as well as northwest of the Rock and Roll Hall of Fame at 41°30′32.65″N 81°41′59.53″W. The museum was renamed the Lake Shore Electric Railway to honor the interurban company from the early 20th century. In 2007, work towards constructing a new carbarn was started at the new location.

The plans for a new museum never materialized, and in May 2009 it was announced that the railcars would be auctioned off. On October 2, 2009, it was announced that auction resulted in the collection being dispersed to a consortium of 10 railway museums. There was no open bidding. The sale price was not disclosed. One trolley, a 1914 Kuhlman streetcar that operated on Euclid Avenue, was slated to be restored and put on display in Cleveland's University Circle neighborhood. However, it was donated to the Illinois Railway Museum in 2013. The Gerald E. Brookins Collection of images was donated to the special collections of the Cleveland State University library.

== See also ==
- Streetcars in Cleveland
