= Nevada State Museum, Carson City =

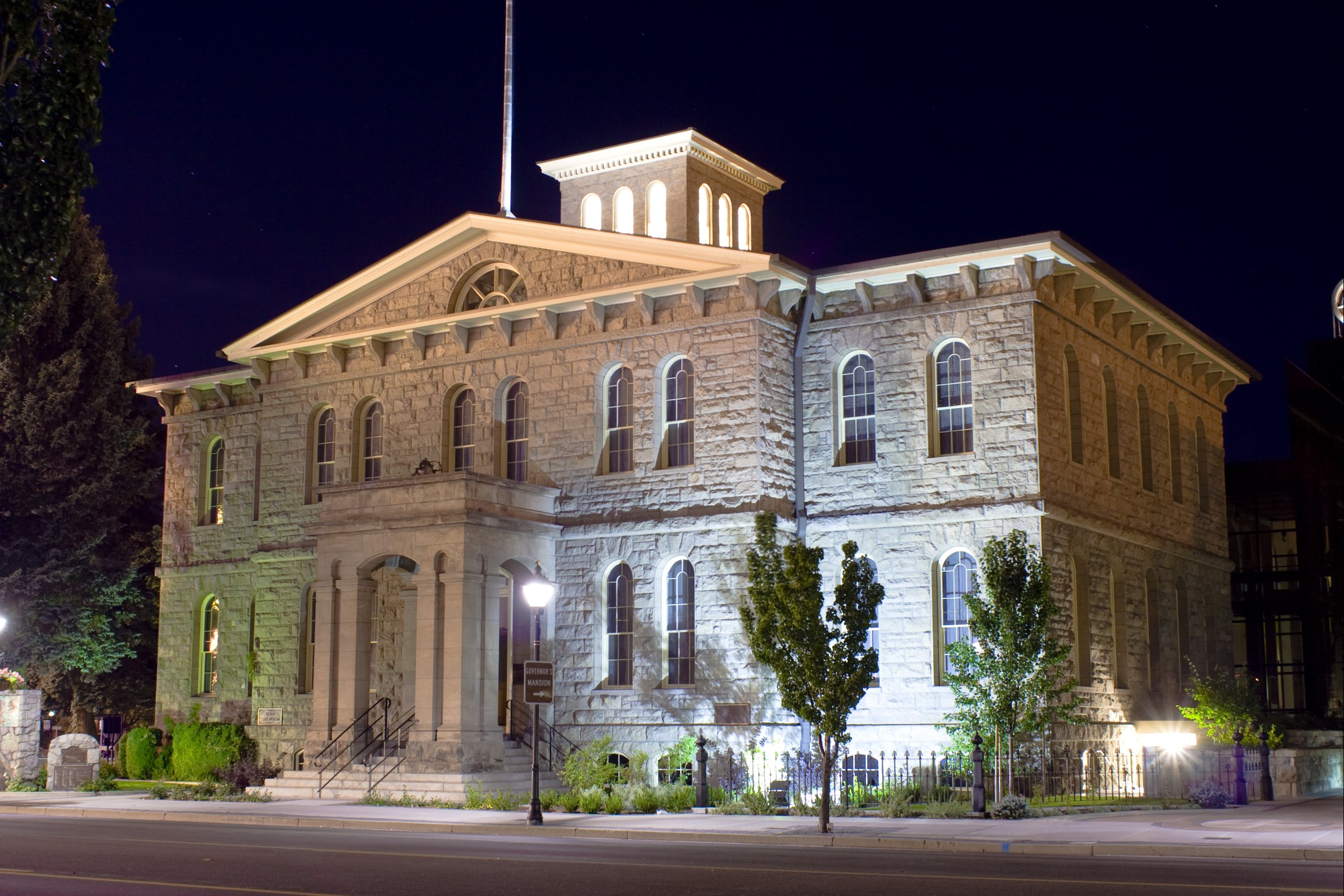
- The Nevada State Museum in Carson City

- Location in Nevada
- Established: 1941
- Coordinates: 39.1675°N 119.7675°W
- Type: History and natural history museum
- Owners: Nevada Department of Tourism and Cultural Affairs
- Website: Official website

The Nevada State Museum, Carson City is one of seven Nevada State Museums operated by the Nevada Department of Tourism and Cultural Affairs. As the premiere flagship institution of the state museum system, it is also the oldest state museum, and sits in the state capital Carson City.

The museum attracts spectators in observing and appreciating the natural and cultural heritage of Nevada. It demonstrates the state's history from the prehistoric period to the present, including geology, paleontology, silver mining, and American Indian culture.

In 2025, its name was changed from the Nevada State Museum to the Nevada State Museum, Carson City by an act of the Nevada Legislature.

== History ==
The Nevada State Museum, Carson City, came into force by conserving the Carson City mint. The mint was in operation from 1870 to 1893, and housed Coin Press No. 1, the sole coin press at the mint.

The museum was founded in 1939 by Judge Clark J. Guild, a district judge in the Nevada judicary, who went on to serve as Chairman of the Board of Trustees and benefactor until his passing in 1971.

According to the museum's website, Guild came across a sign selling the Carson City mint and started his campaign to acquire the building, which resulted in its purchase from the federal government by the State of Nevada for $5,000. Tthe museum opened to the public on Nevada Day, October 31, 1941.

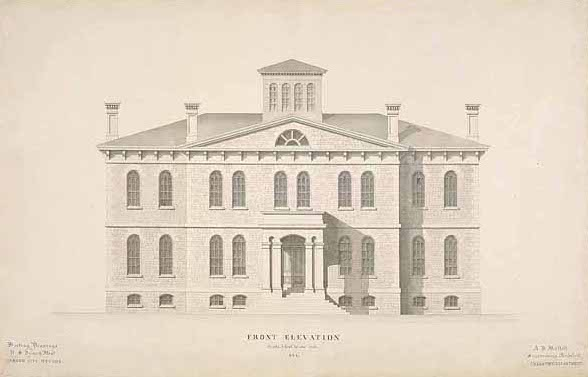
Carson City Mint historical drafting sheet

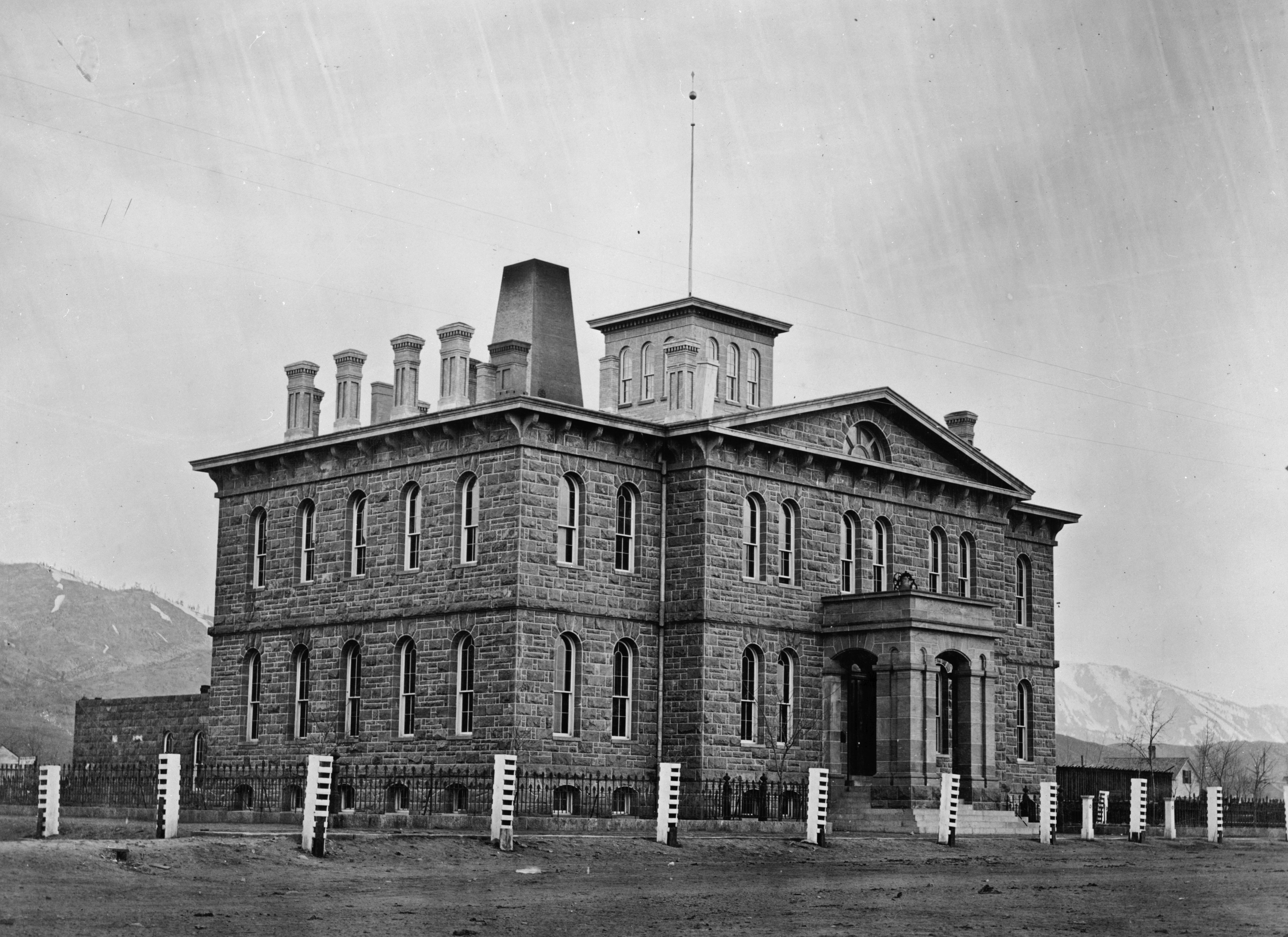
Historic image of the Carson City Mint

== Exhibits at the Nevada State Museum ==
The Nevada State Museum features ongoing and temporary exhibitions. Recent collaborations include artist Melissa Melero-Moose's This Is Us: Contemporary Art From the Great Basin Native Artists, which featured local Native American artists.

=== Current exhibits ===
- Historic Carson City Mint, a permanent exhibit, featuring Coin Press No. 1 of the Mint and CC (Carson City) marked Comstock silver dollars.
- Nevada's Changing Earth, a permanent exhibit of rocks, mineral and fossils found in Nevada and the western US.
- Nevada: A People and Place through Time, featuring objects from the history of Nevada, including silver service of the USS Nevada fashioned from 5,000 ounces of silver and lined with gold from Goldfield.
- Under One Sky, an exhibit demonstrating the history of the earliest inhabitants of Nevada through 10,000 year-old artifacts. Situated in the latest section of the museum, this exhibit shows American Indian culture from a Native American viewpoint.
- Waší∙šiw Guwá: The Work of the Washoe People, featuring baskets by the Washoe people including Sarah Jim Mayo and Louisa Keyser (Dat So La Lee).
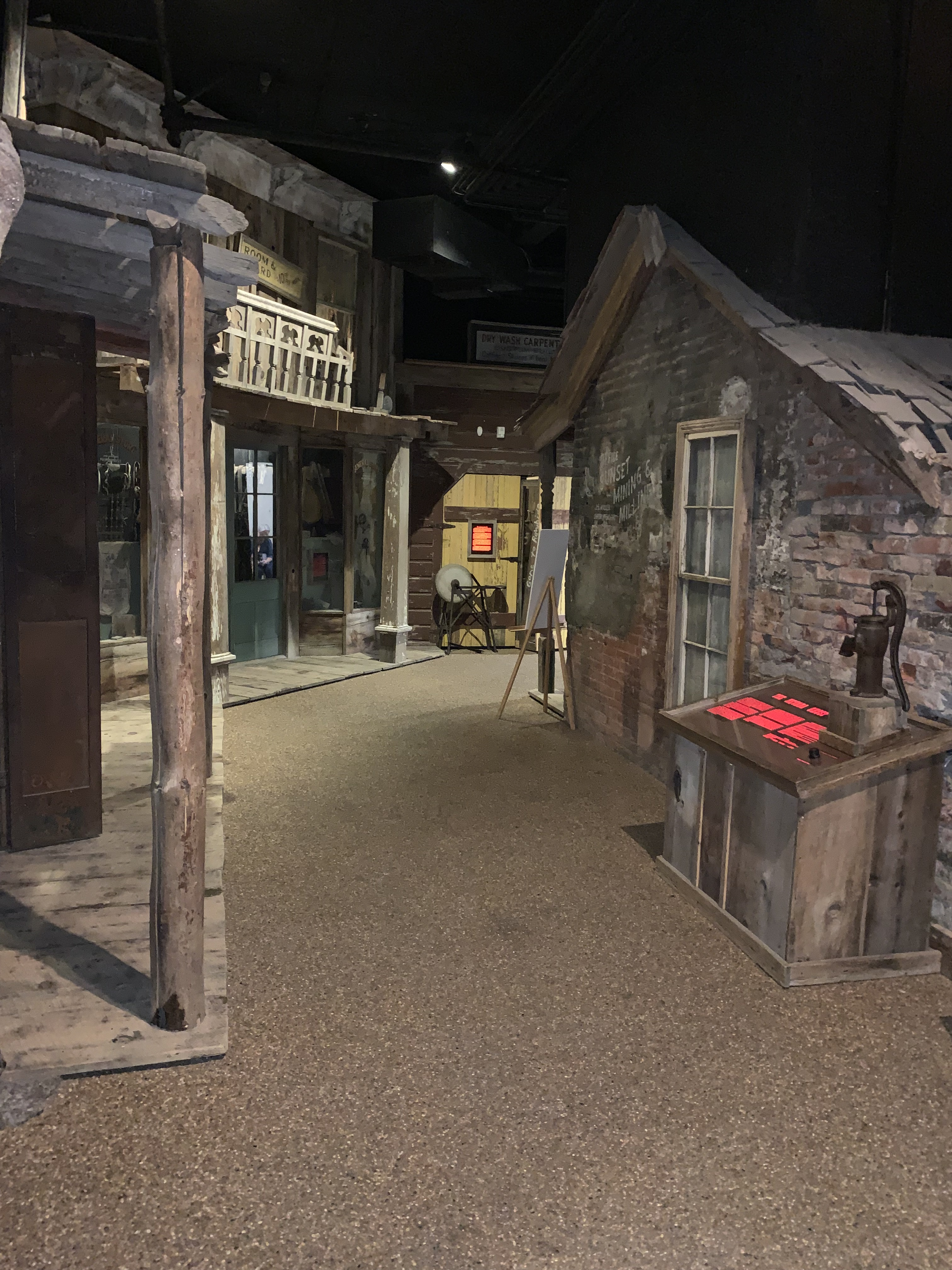
  Ghost town exhibit, Nevada State Museum, Carson City, Nevada.

=== Louisa Keyser (Dat So La Lee) Baskets ===
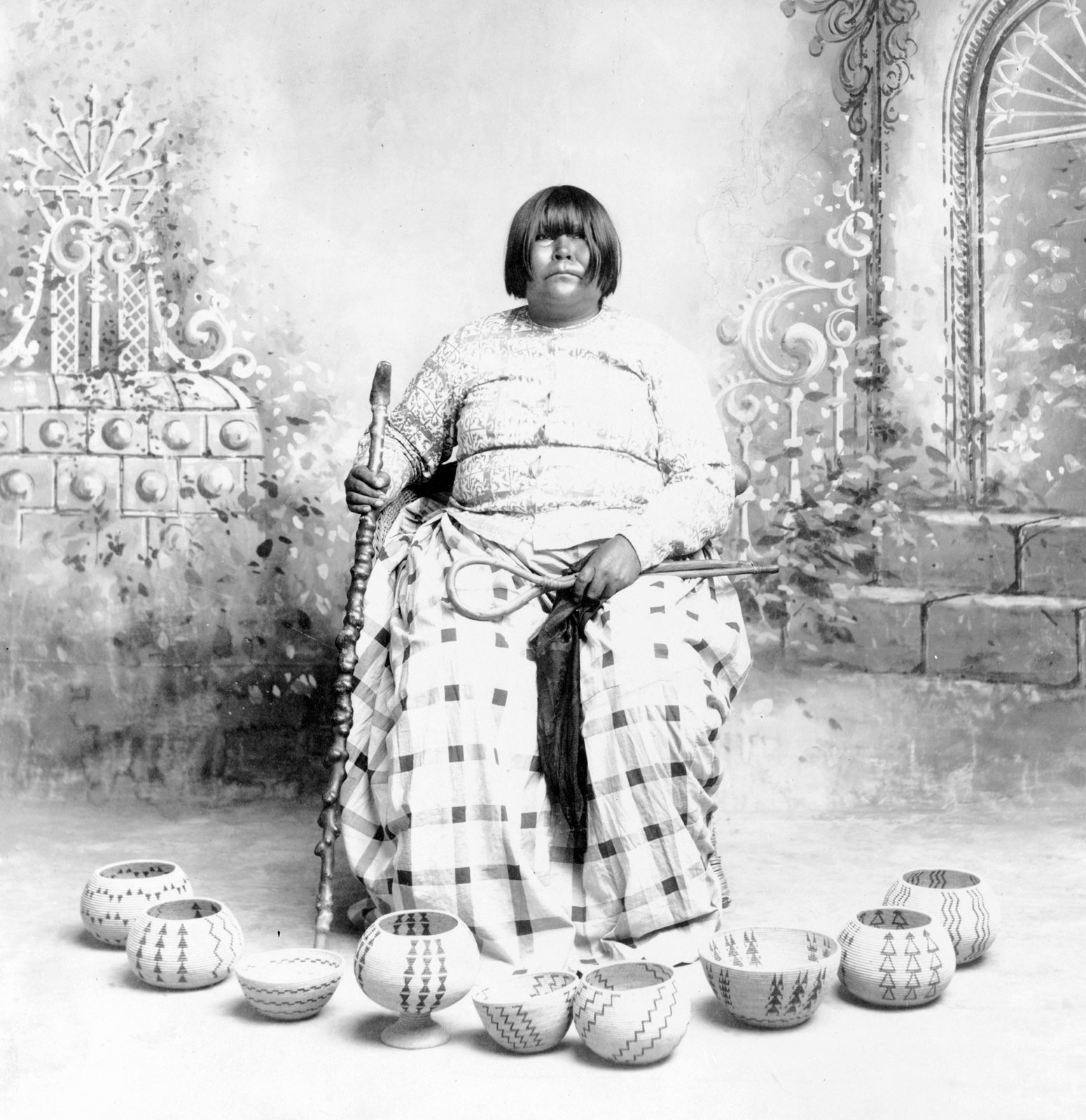
Image of Louisa Keyser amongst her baskets in Carson City

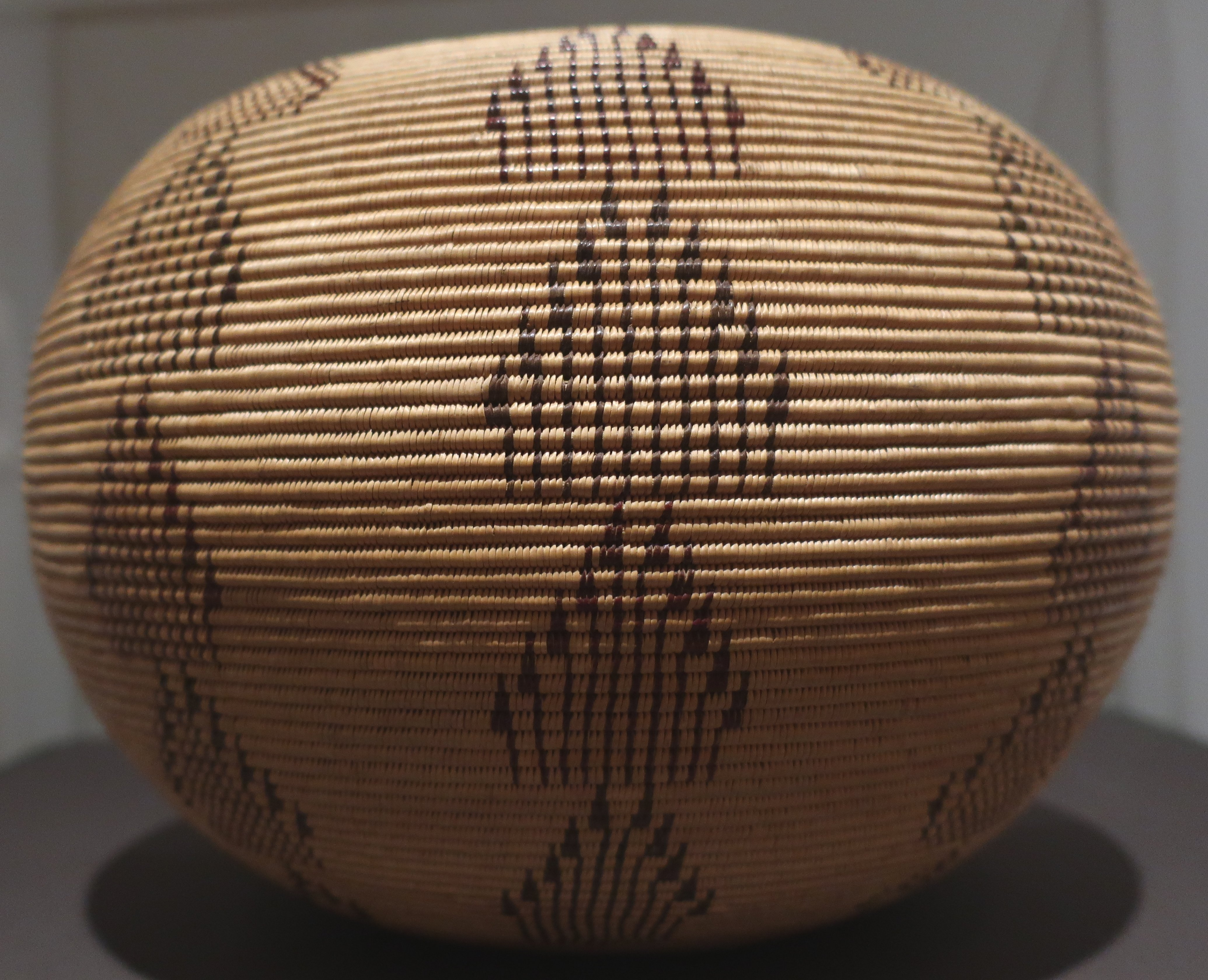
Image of a Dat So La Lee basket

Housed in the museum's permanent collection, a collection of intricate Washoe baskets woven by Dat So La Lee, a notable Washoe weaver renowned for her degikup technique. The exhibit displayed her ten baskets in the museum collection, plus 29 other Washoe baskets. There is also a mural of the artist on an exterior museum wall.

=== Notable Objects ===
The museum houses rare collections related to the history of the American West: Basketry of the Great Basin Native American people, Fey Slot Machine Collection, firearms of the Old West, Chinatown cultural materials, and the silver service set made for the USS Nevada battleship. It also houses a mummified cat found in a tree in Genoa, Nevada. On display is the world's largest exhibited Columbian mammoth found in the Black Rock Desert.

== See also ==
- Nevada State Museum, Las Vegas
