= Nevada State Museum, Las Vegas =

Museum focused on the history of Las Vegas, Nevada, USA

Coordinates: 36.172070°N 115.190398°W

- Former name: Nevada State Museum and Historical Society
- Established: 1982
- Location: 309 S. Valley View Blvd. (on the campus of the Springs Preserve) Las Vegas, Nevada 89107
- Type: General or Multi disciplinary (several subjects)
- Accreditation: The American Alliance of Museums
- Key holdings: Ichthyosaur replica (Nevada’s state fossil) and a 13-foot articulated mammoth skeleton
- Director: Hollis J. Gillespie
- Curators: Dr. Richard Gawne, Ph.D., Curator of Natural History; Josef Diaz, Curator of History & Material Culture; Kassidy Whetstone, Curator of Library, Manuscripts & Photographs; Jordan Canal, Curator of Learning & Community Engagement; Holly Piper, Curator of Collections
- Owners: Nevada Department of Tourism and Cultural Affairs
- Public transit access: RTC Bus #104 (Valley View/Torrey Pines), Meadows Mall stop; RTC Bus #207 (Alta/Stewart), Valley View @ Meadows stop
- Parking: Parking is free at the museum
- Website: http://nvculture.org/nevadastatemuseumlasvegas/

The Nevada State Museum, Las Vegas is located on the campus of the Springs Preserve, in Las Vegas, Nevada and is one of seven Nevada State Museums operated by the Nevada Department of Tourism and Cultural Affairs. The name was changed from the Nevada State Museum and Historical Society in 2008 when the museum moved from Lorenzi Park, Las Vegas to the Springs Preserve campus. The museum houses items from the development of Las Vegas as well as the natural history of the area. The museum is open Thursday through Monday, 9 am to 4 pm, closed Thanksgiving and Christmas.

== Accreditation ==
The Nevada State Museum, Las Vegas is accredited by the American Alliance of Museums.

== First location ==
The 1982 museum was located in Lorenzi Park but was moved into a new building on the campus of the Springs Preserve in Las Vegas, where it opened in October 2011.

== Current location ==
The museum opened in October 2011, in a building completed in 2009 on the campus of the Springs Preserve in Las Vegas . The building remained unused for two years as a result of state budget constraints from the 2008 economic slowdown. The new building has 11,000 square feet of permanent exhibit space. It houses exhibits on regional and natural history with a 13-foot articulated mammoth skeleton and an in-depth treatment of Las Vegas history. Admission for children 17 and younger is free.

== Exhibits ==
In 2021, the Nevada State museum held a program featuring the Folies Bergere at The Tropicana Hotel Las Vegas. The Tropicana Hotel donated many Folies Bergere costumes to the museum for its collection.

== See also ==
- Nevada State Museum, Carson City
