= List of preserved Canadian Pacific Railway rolling stock =

A large quantity of rolling stock formerly owned and operated by Canadian Pacific Railway have been preserved in museums, on tourist railroads, and various other locations all across North America.

== Preserved steam locomotives ==
Photograph	Number	Class	Build date	Builder	Wheel arrangement (Whyte notation)	Disposition and Location	Notes	References
	3	Class A2-L	1882	Dübs and Company	4-4-0	Operational at the Prairie Dog Central Railway in Winnipeg, Manitoba.		
	29	Class A1e	September 1887	CP's New Shops	4-4-0	On static display outside the Canadian Pacific headquarters in Calgary, Alberta.		
	136	Class A2m	August 1883	Rogers Locomotive and Machine Works	4-4-0	Operational at the South Simcoe Railway in Tottenham, Ontario.		
	144	Class A2q	1886	CP's New Shops	4-4-0	At the Canadian Railway Museum in Saint-Constant, Quebec.		
	374	-	May 1886	CP's New Shops	4-4-0	At the Roundhouse Community Centre.		
	453	-	January 1912	CPR's Angus Shops	4-6-0	Privately owned. Sitting derelict in a rail yard in Goshen, Virginia.		
	492	-	-	CPR's Angus Shops	4-6-0	On static display at the Canadian Railway Museum in Saint-Constant, Quebec.		
	926	-	September 1911	CPR's Angus Shops	4-6-0	On static display at the National Museum of Science and Technology in Ottawa, Canada.		
	972	Class D-10h	September 1912	Montreal Locomotive Works (MLW)	4-6-0	Disassembled awaiting restoration at the Strasburg Rail Road in Strasburg, Pennsylvania.		
	999	Class D-10h	May 1912	Montreal Locomotive Works (MLW)	4-6-0	Stored at the Canadian Railway Museum in Saint-Constant, Quebec, Canada.		
	1057	Class D-10h	December 1912	Montreal Locomotive Works (MLW)	4-6-0	Awaiting overhaul at the South Simcoe Railway in Tottenham, Ontario, Canada.		
	1095	Class D-10h	October 1913	Canadian Locomotive Company (CLC)	4-6-0	On static display in Kingston, Ontario, Canada next to the former train station.		
	1098	Class D-10h	October 1913	Canadian Locomotive Company (CLC)	4-6-0	On static display right next to the Reading Blue Mountain and Northern Railroad's Reading Outer Station in Port Clinton, Pennsylvania.		
	1201	Class G5a	1944	CPR's Angus Shops	4-6-2	Stored out of service at the Canada Science and Technology Museum in Ottawa.		
	1238	Class G5c	1946	Canadian Locomotive Company (CLC)	4-6-2	Stored at the Prairie Dog Central Railway in Winnipeg, Manitoba in Canada.		
	1246	Class G5d	1946	Canadian Locomotive Company (CLC)	4-6-2	Stored at the Railroad Museum of New England.		
	1278	Class G5d	April 1948	Canadian Locomotive Company (CLC)	4-6-2	At the Age of Steam Roundhouse in Sugarcreek, Ohio.		
	1286	Class G5d	1948	Canadian Locomotive Company (CLC)	4-6-2	Stored at the Prairie Dog Central Railway in Winnipeg, Manitoba in Canada.		
	1293	Class G5d	June, 1948	Canadian Locomotive Company (CLC)	4-6-2	Undergoing an overhaul at the Age of Steam Roundhouse in Sugarcreek, Ohio.		
	2018	Class U3c	1905	CPR's Angus Shops	0-6-0	At Heritage Park in Calgary, Alberta.	Formerly numbered 2144 from 1912 to 1913 and 6144 from 1913 to 1992	
	2317	Class G3c	June 1923	Montreal Locomotive Works (MLW)	4-6-2	On static display at the Steamtown National Historic Site in Scranton, Pennsylvania.		
	2341	Class G3d	1926	Montreal Locomotive Works (MLW)	4-6-2	Stored at the Canadian Railway Museum in Saint-Constant, Quebec, Canada.		
	2816	Class H1b	December 1930	Montreal Locomotive Works (MLW)	4-6-4	Operational.		
	2839	Class H1c	1937	Montreal Locomotive Works (MLW)	4-6-4	Now at the Nethercutt Collection and Museum in Sylmar, California.		
	2850	Class H1e	1937	Montreal Locomotive Works (MLW)	4-6-4	At the Canadian Railway Museum in Saint-Constant, Quebec, Canada.		
	2858	Class H1d	August 1938	Montreal Locomotive Works (MLW)	4-6-4	On static display at the Canada Science and Technology Museum in Ottawa.		
	2860	Class H1e	1940	Montreal Locomotive Works (MLW)	4-6-4	On static display at the Railway Museum of British Columbia under the ownership of the Government of British Columbia.	Formerly ran excursions between North Vancouver and Squamish between 1974 and 1999.	
	2928	Class F1a		Canadian Locomotive Company (CLC)	4-4-4	At the Canadian Railway Museum in Saint-Constant, Quebec, Canada.		
	2929	Class F1a	1936	Canadian Locomotive Company (CLC)	4-4-4	On static display at the Steamtown National Historic Site in Scranton, Pennsylvania.		
	3100	Class K1	1928	-	4-8-4	On display at the Canada Science and Technology Museum in Ottawa.		
	3101	Class K1	1928	-	4-8-4	On display at EVRAZ (formerly IPSCO Steel) Regina, Saskatchewan.		
	3522	Class N2		Montreal Locomotive Works (MLW)	2-8-0	On display in Bienfait, Saskatchewan.		
	3651	Class N2		Montreal Locomotive Works (MLW)	2-8-0	On public display in Lethbridge, Alberta		
	3716	Class N-2-b	1912	Montreal Locomotive Works (MLW)	2-8-0	Operational at the Kettle Valley Railway Society.		
	5361	Class P2e	September 1926	Canadian Locomotive Company (CLC)	2-8-2	Stored at Depew, New York.		
	5468	Class P2k	1948	Montreal Locomotive Works (MLW)	2-8-2	On static display at the Revelstoke Railway Museum, British Columbia.	Formerly at the Canadian Railway Museum in Saint-Constant, Quebec.	
	5931	Class T1c	1949	Montreal Locomotive Works (MLW)	2-10-4	Located at the main entrance to Heritage Park in Calgary, Alberta.		
	5935	Class T1c	March 1949	Montreal Locomotive Works (MLW)	2-10-4	At the Canadian Railway Museum in Saint-Constant, Quebec, Canada.		

== Preserved diesel locomotives ==
Photograph	Locomotive	Model	Build date	Manufacturer	Wheel arrangement	Disposition and Location	Notes	References
	22	D-T-C	1960	Canadian Locomotive Company (CLC)		Operational at the South Simcoe Railway in Tottenham, Ontario, Canada.		
	1404	FP7A	1953			Railway Museum of British Columbia		
	4038	FP7A	-	Electro-Motive Division (EMD)		At Minnedosa, Manitoba.		
	4069	FP7A	1952	Electro-Motive Division (EMD)		Under the ownership of the West Coast Railway Association and is located at the Railway Museum of British Columbia.		
	4071	FP7A	September 1952	Electro-Motive Division (EMD)		Operational at the Durbin and Greenbrier Valley Railroad.		
	4090	FA-2		Montreal Locomotive Works (MLW)		On static display at the Cranbrook History Centre in Cranbrook, British Columbia.		
	4099	FP7A	-	Electro-Motive Division (EMD)		On static display in Ogden.		
	4104	CPA 16–4	-	Fairbanks-Morse (FM)		Privately owned and stored at Nelson, B.C.		
	4213	C-424	1965	American Locomotive Company (ALCO)		Operational at the West Chester Railroad in West Chester, Pennsylvania.		
	4230	C-424	1965	American Locomotive Company (ALCO)		Operational at the West Chester Railroad in West Chester, Pennsylvania.		
	4237	C-424	1965	Montreal Locomotive Works (MLW)		At the Canadian Railway Museum in Saint-Constant, Quebec, Canada.		
	4241	C-424	January 1966	Montreal Locomotive Works (MLW)		At the Cuyahoga Valley Scenic Railroad.		
	4455	CPB 16–4	-	Fairbanks-Morse (FM)		Locomotive & Railway Historical Society of Western Canada, stored near Calgary, AB		
	4456	CPB 16–4	-	Fairbanks-Morse (FM)		Locomotive & Railway Historical Society of Western Canada, stored near Calgary, AB		
	4563	M-630	-	Montreal Locomotive Works (MLW)		At the Canadian Railway Museum in Saint-Constant, Quebec, Canada.		
	4744	M-640	1971	Montreal Locomotive Works (MLW)	C-C	At the Canadian Railway Museum in Saint-Constant, Quebec, Canada.		
	5000	GP30	1963	Electro-Motive Division (EMD)	B-B	At the Alberta Railway Museum in Edmonton, Alberta, Canada.		
	5500	SD40	1966	Electro-Motive Division (EMD)	C-C	At the Revelstoke Railway Museum in Revelstoke, British Columbia.		
	5577	SD40-2		Electro-Motive Division (EMD)	C-C	Operational at the New Hope & Ivyland Railroad in New Hope, Pennsylvania		
	5903	SD40-2		Electro-Motive Division (EMD)	C-C	At the Canadian Railway Museum in Saint-Constant, Quebec, Canada.		
	6503	S-3		Montreal Locomotive Works (MLW)		Under the ownership of the West Coast Railway Association and is located at the Railway Museum of British Columbia.		
	6568	S-3		Montreal Locomotive Works (MLW)		On display at the Saskatchewan Railway Museum		
	7000		1937	National Steel Car (NSC)		At the Canadian Railway Museum in Saint-Constant, Quebec, Canada.		
	7006	CPA 16–4		Fairbanks-Morse (FM)		Canada Museum Science & Technology in Ottawa		
	7009	FM H-16-66		Fairbanks-Morse (FM)		Privately owned and stored at Nelson, British Columbia		
	7020	S-2	1944	American Locomotive Company (ALCO)		Operational at the Toronto Railway Museum in Toronto, Ontario, Canada.		
	7069	DS-4-4-1000		Baldwin Locomotive Works (BLW)		At the Toronto Railway Museum in Toronto, Ontario, Canada.		
	7077	S-2		Montreal Locomotive Works (MLW)		At the Canadian Railway Museum in Saint-Constant, Quebec, Canada.		
	8218	GP9U		Electro Motive Division (EMD)		Operational at the New Hope & Ivyland Railroad in New Hope, Pennsylvania		
	8554	H-16-44		Fairbanks-Morse (FM)		Locomotive & Railway Historical Society of Western Canada in Calgary, Alberta		
	8762	RS-18	1960	Montreal Locomotive Works (MLW)		Operational at the West Chester Railroad in West Chester, Pennsylvania.		
	8779	RS-18	1958	Montreal Locomotive Works (MLW)		At the Cuyahoga Valley Scenic Railroad.		
	8905	H-24-66		Canadian Locomotive Company (CLC)	C-C	At the Canadian Railway Museum in Saint-Constant, Quebec, Canada.		
	8921	RSD-17	May 1957	Montreal Locomotive Works (MLW)		Preserved at the Elgin County Railway Museum, St. Thomas, Ontario, Canada.		

=== Preserved diesel locomotive parts ===
Locomotive	Model	Build date	Manufacturer	Wheel arrangement	Preserved part and Location	Notes	References
8900	H-24-66	1955	Fairbanks-Morse (FM)	C-C	Engine block, at a gas station in Rockford, Illinois		
8903	H-24-66	June 1956	Canadian Locomotive Company (CLC)	C-C	Engine block, at a gas station in Illinois		
8904	H-24-66	1956	Canadian Locomotive Company (CLC)	C-C	Engine block, at a gas station in Rockford, Illinois		

== Preserved passenger cars ==
Photograph	Number	Build date	Builder	Type	Disposition and Location	Notes	References
	1	1864	Crossen Car Manufacturing Company	Business car	At the Canadian Railway Museum in Saint-Constant, Quebec.		
	16 British Columbia	1890	Barney and Smith Car Company	Business car	Preserved at the Railway Museum of British Columbia in Squamish, British Columbia.	Oldest piece of rail equipment in the museum	
	598 Henry Pickering	1914	CPR Angus Shops	Open observation car	Preserved at the Railway Museum of British Columbia in Squamish, British Columbia.		

== Preserved steam generators ==
Photograph	Number	Build date	Builder	Disposition and Location	Notes	References
	400900	-	-	At the Revelstoke Railway Museum in Revelstoke, British Columbia		

== Preserved cabooses ==
Photograph	Number	Build date	Builder	Disposition and Location	Notes	References
	434677	1981	CP Angus Shops	Displayed at the Mangapps Railway Museum in Burnham-on-Crouch, England		
	437477	1954		Displayed at the Revelstoke Railway Museum in Revelstoke, British Columbia		
