= Canadian National class E-7 2-6-0 =

Class of locomotives

Canadian National class E-7
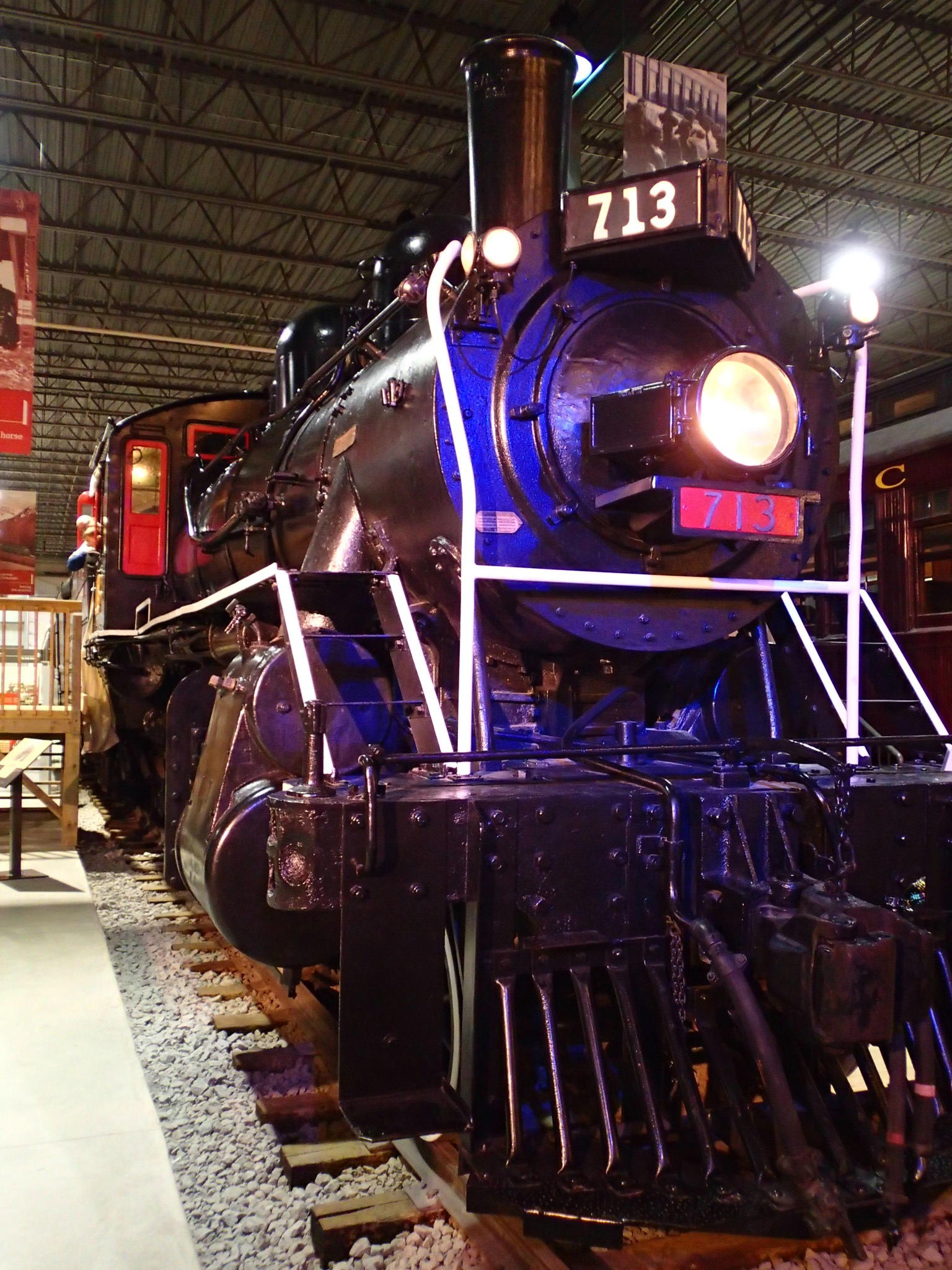
- No. 713 on display at the Canadian Railway Museum
Type and origin
- Power type: Steam
- Build date: 1898–1908
- Total produced: 204
Specifications
- Configuration
  - Whyte: 2-6-0
  - UIC: 1′C
- Gauge: 4 ft 8 1/2 in (1,435 mm)
- Driver dia.: 63 in (1.6 m)
- Wheelbase: 24 ft 3 in (7.39 m)
- Length: 60 ft 8 in (18.49 m) including tender
- Fuel type: Coal
- Boiler pressure: 200 psi (1.4 MPa)
- Cylinders: Two, outside
- Cylinder size: 20 in × 26 in (510 mm × 660 mm)
Performance figures
- Tractive effort: 28,000 lbf (120 kN)
Career
- Operators: Grand Trunk Railway; Canadian National Railway
- Retired: 1957
- Preserved: CN 713
- Disposition: 1 preserved, remainder scrapped

Canadian National Railway (CN) Class E-7 was a class of 2-6-0 steam locomotives. These locomotives were built for the Grand Trunk Railway (GT) from 1898 through 1908. Some of the class had been built as compound locomotives with 200 psi (1.4 MPa) boilers feeding 22.5-inch (570 mm) and 35-by-26-inch (890 mm × 660 mm) cylinders; but all save one had been rebuilt as simple single-expansion locomotives beginning in 1911. GT began adding superheaters to these locomotives in 1913. CN simplified the last compound and continued the superheating conversions, but some locomotives never received superheaters. Most of the class were scrapped in the 1930s; but number 713 worked on the Berlin Subdivision branch to Lewiston, Maine, until replaced by diesel locomotives in 1957, and was preserved in the Canadian Railway Museum.

Builder	Works numbers	Dates	CN numbers	GT numbers	Notes
Baldwin	15659–15664	1898	661–666	1375–1380	
Schenectady	4663–4666; 4685–4686	1898	667–672	1381–1386	
GT shops	1295–1300; 1311; 1313–1317; 1319–1332; 1334; 1347; 1390; 1416	1899–1903	673–675; 708–731; 750–751; 810	1387–1414; 1427–1429	
Dickson	1184–1189	1901	676–678; 732–734	1415–1420	
Brooks	3752–3757	1901	679–684	1421–1426	
GT shops	1318; 1333; 1335–1346; 1348; 1366–1375; 1378–1389; 1391–1415; 1417–1429; 1455–1479	1900–1904	735–749; 752–809; 811–835; 863–864	1200–1299	built as compound saturated engines
MLW	30678–30683; 30685–30687	1905	836–844	1300–1308	built as compound saturated engines
MLW	30684	1905	852	1430	
CLC	664–678	1905–1906	845–851; 853–860	1309–1323	built as compound saturated engines
Baldwin	31678–31680; 31761–31763; 31779–31780; 31808–31810; 31837; 31860; 31885–31886; 32857–32858; 32867–32870; 32879–32880; 32892; 32922	1907–1908	685–707; 861–862	1431–1455	
