= Canadian Pacific 29 =

Preserved CPR class A1e 4-4-0 locomotive

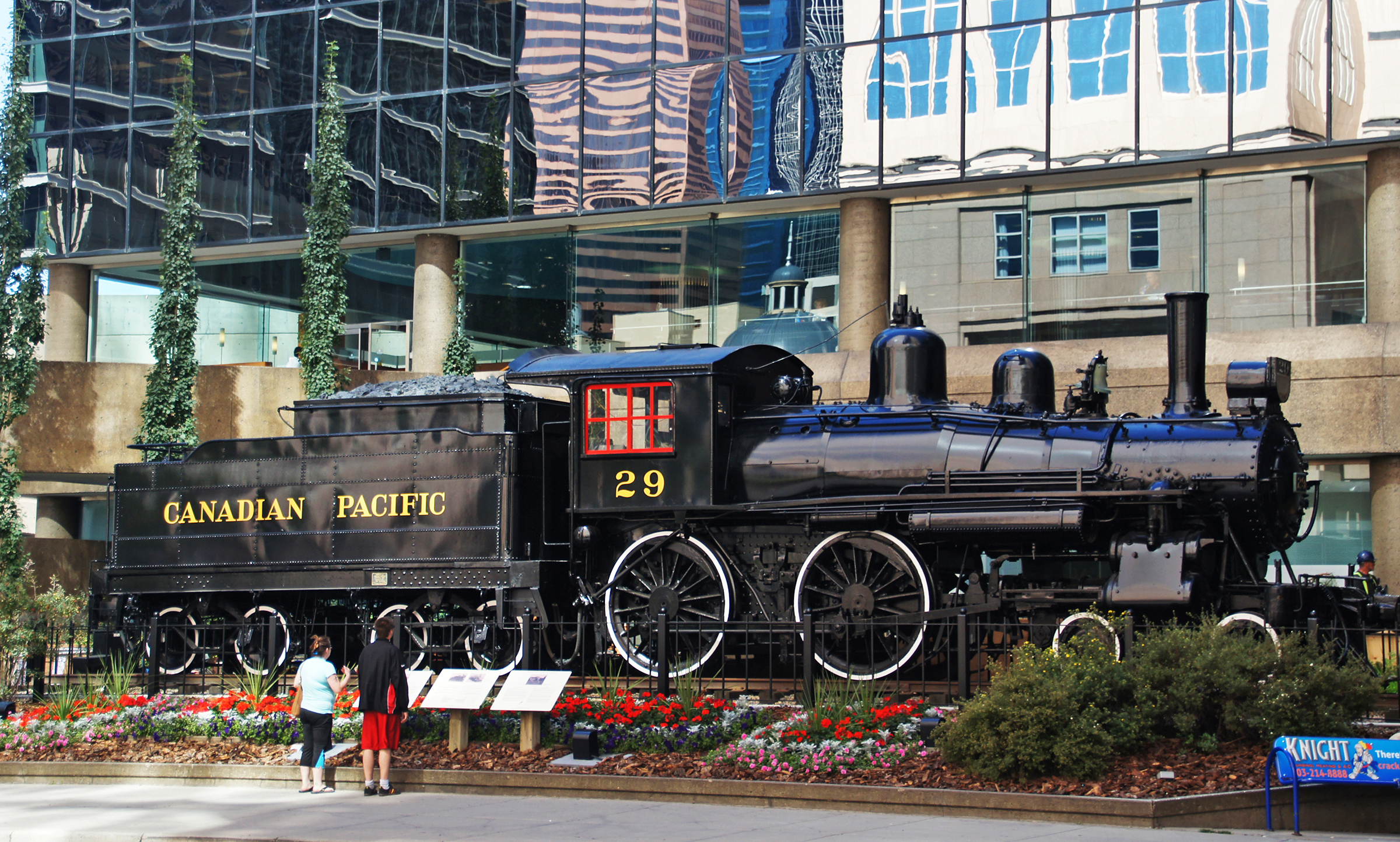
- No. 29 on static display in front of the Canadian Pacific Railway's headquarters in Calgary, Alberta, 2012
Type and origin
- Power type: Steam
- Builder: Canadian Pacific Railway's DeLorimier Shops
- Serial number: 1065
- Build date: September 1887
- Rebuild date: 1912
Specifications
- Configuration
  - Whyte: 4-4-0
  - UIC: 2′B n2
- Driver dia.: 69 in (1,800 mm) (Pre-1912); 70 in (1,800 mm) (Post-1912)
- Wheelbase: 47.93 ft (14.61 m)
  - Engine: 22.96 ft (7.00 m)
  - Drivers: 8.50 ft (2.59 m)
- Adhesive weight: 71,000 lb (32,000 kg)
- Loco weight: 115,000 lb (52,000 kg)
- Tender weight: 105,000 lb (48,000 kg)
- Total weight: 220,000 lb (100,000 kg)
- Fuel type: Coal
- Fuel capacity: 10 t (9.8 long tons; 11 short tons)
- Water cap.: 4,800 US gal (18,000 L; 4,000 imp gal)
- Firebox
  - Grate area: 17.40 sq ft (1.617 m^{2})
- Boiler pressure: 160 psi (1,100 kPa)
- Heating surface
  - Firebox: 125 sq ft (11.6 m^{2})
- Cylinders: Two, outside
- Cylinder size: 17 in × 24 in (430 mm × 610 mm)
- Valve gear: Stephenson
Performance figures
- Tractive effort: 13,476 lb (6,113 kg)
- Factor of adh.: 5.27
Career
- Operators: Canadian Pacific Railway; Salem and Hillsborough Railway
- Class: A-1e
- Numbers: CPR 390; CPR 217; CPR 29
- Retired: November 6, 1960 (revenue service); September 16, 1994 (excursion service)
- Restored: September 7, 1987
- Current owner: Canadian Railway Historical Association
- Disposition: On static display

Canadian Pacific Railway 29 is a preserved A-1e class 4-4-0 "American" type steam locomotive. It was built by the Canadian Pacific's DeLorimier Shops in 1887 as locomotive No. 390, before being renumbered 277 in 1905. It was renumbered again to 29 after being rebuilt in 1912. By the 1950s, No. 29 was the youngest of three CPR 4-4-0s that were regularly used on the Norton-Chipman mixed train. After being retired from the Canadian Pacific in 1960, the locomotive was donated to the Canadian Railway Museum in Saint-Constant, Quebec for static display. In 1983, No. 29 was acquired by the Salem and Hillsborough Railway, and it was then moved to Hillsborough, New Brunswick, for further display. It was subsequently restored to operating condition for the locomotive's 100th birthday in 1987. In late 1994, No. 29 fell victim to a shed fire that would put an end to the locomotive's S&H career. Two years later, the locomotive was reacquired by the Canadian Pacific, who moved and cosmetically restored it for static display in front of their headquarters in Calgary, Alberta. In 2017, the locomotive was moved again to the CPR's new headquarters in Ogden yard. Although the locomotive is in good condition, an operational restoration on No. 29 would be expensive.

== History ==
=== Revenue service ===
In 1883, the Canadian Pacific Railway (CPR) began constructing their own steam locomotives in their own facilities in De Lorimier Avenue in Montreal, Quebec, and they discontinued that practice in 1907. One such group of locomotives built by the CPR was the A-1e class, a class of 4-4-0s that were initially numbered 371–400, and were built from 1886 to 1888. No. 29 was originally numbered 390 as the nineteenth member of the class. The A-1es were initially used for pulling passenger trains on the CPR's mainline trackage. In the turn of the 20th century, the A-1es were relegated to branch line passenger trains and yard switching, as larger locomotives were built. Throughout the mid-late 1900s, the CPR decided to change the road numbers of most of their locomotives to avoid duplication and confusion, and as a result, A-1es were renumbered in 1905 to 92–96, 114–115, 206–218(No. 390 was renumbered to 217), 237–240, and 272–277.

In the early 1910s, the CPR began selling off most of their 4-4-0s, but those that remained on their roster became modernized. No. 277 was sent back to the CPR's DeLorimier shops in 1912 to be rebuilt with a new boiler, modernized cylinders, larger driving wheels, a steel cab, a new tender, and a new cowcatcher. It was also renumbered again to 29. The locomotive was reassigned again the following year to pull mixed trains on the CPR's newly acquired branch line that lied between Norton and Chipman, New Brunswick, and the locomotive would remain in revenue service on that route for the next forty-seven years. By the 1950s, No. 29 became the youngest out of only three 4-4-0s that were left on the CPR's active roster, the only other two being A-2m No. 136 and A-2q No. 144. The bridges of the Norton-Chipman branch could not support the weight of the then-new diesel locomotives.

However, the three 4-4-0s were approaching the age of seventy years, and the CPR began investing in lighter diesel locomotives. In 1959, No. 29 was sent to McAdam to be fitted with a fake diamond smokestack to take part in a centennial celebration in Caribou, Maine, a town in the United States that was served by the CPR. On November 6 of the following year, No. 29 made the last official steam run for the CPR by pulling a farewell to steam fantrip from Montreal to St. Lin and return, and the railway subsequently made a complete transition to diesel power. After the final run, the CPR donated No. 29 to the Canadian Railway Museum in Saint-Constant, Quebec, where it spent the next twenty-three years on static display.

=== Rise and fall in excursion service ===
In 1983, the Salem and Hillsborough Railway (S&H), a tourist railroad that ran on former Canadian National (CN) trackage between Hillsborough and Salisbury, acquired No. 29 from the Canadian Railway Museum, and the locomotive arrived in Hillsborough on a flatcar in November of that year. No. 29 spent three years on static display at the S&H's rail yard adjacent to Main Street. In 1986, when No. 29's 100th birthday was approaching, the S&H sought the possibility of hosting a birthday party on Labor Day weekend to commemorate this event.

After inspecting it for a restoration, it was agreed that the 4-4-0 would only operate for a double headed excursion with CN 4-6-0 No. 1009. The mechanical staff, along with some volunteers from the New Brunswick, Rideau Valley and St. Lawrence Valley Divisions of CN, began performing the restoration work in July 1987, and volunteers steam-cleaned the flues and tubes, which were clogged up with soot. The locomotive was then moved into the repair facility to be disassembled, so the provincial boiler inspector would be able to perform a thorough inspection of the locomotive. It was during this inspection that multiple cracks were discovered on the boiler shell feedwater connection which had to be ground out; several flexible stay caps also had to be replaced. After this task was completed, they successfully passed a hydrostatic water test, and they were ready to reassemble all of the equipment inside the cab. No. 29 received one repaint job and was returned outside to be fueled with coal and water. One week before dedication day, the boiler inspector recommended that the S&H fire up No. 29 only for the dedication day event.

On Sunday, September 7, a fire was lit inside No. 29's firebox for the first time in twenty-seven years. A new layer of CPR lettering was applied to the tender, and it was topped off with water. Subsequently, a small hole developed on the engineer's side of the cab, so a brief repair was made, consisting of a tree branch jammed in with the flush cut off, and black paint was used to cover the minor repair. With restoration work fully completed, No. 29 was pushed backwards down to Gray's Island to await that day's excursion train to return. After being coupled on, Numbers 29 and 1009 moved on the long grade into Hillsborough with many photographers recording the train as it passed through. At the depot, a short ceremony was held, and a special cake cut and given out to those who attended. The A-1e saw multiple cab visitors and several stories being told about the locomotive's revenue career. Once the event was over, No. 29's fire was again dropped, and it was put back into storage.

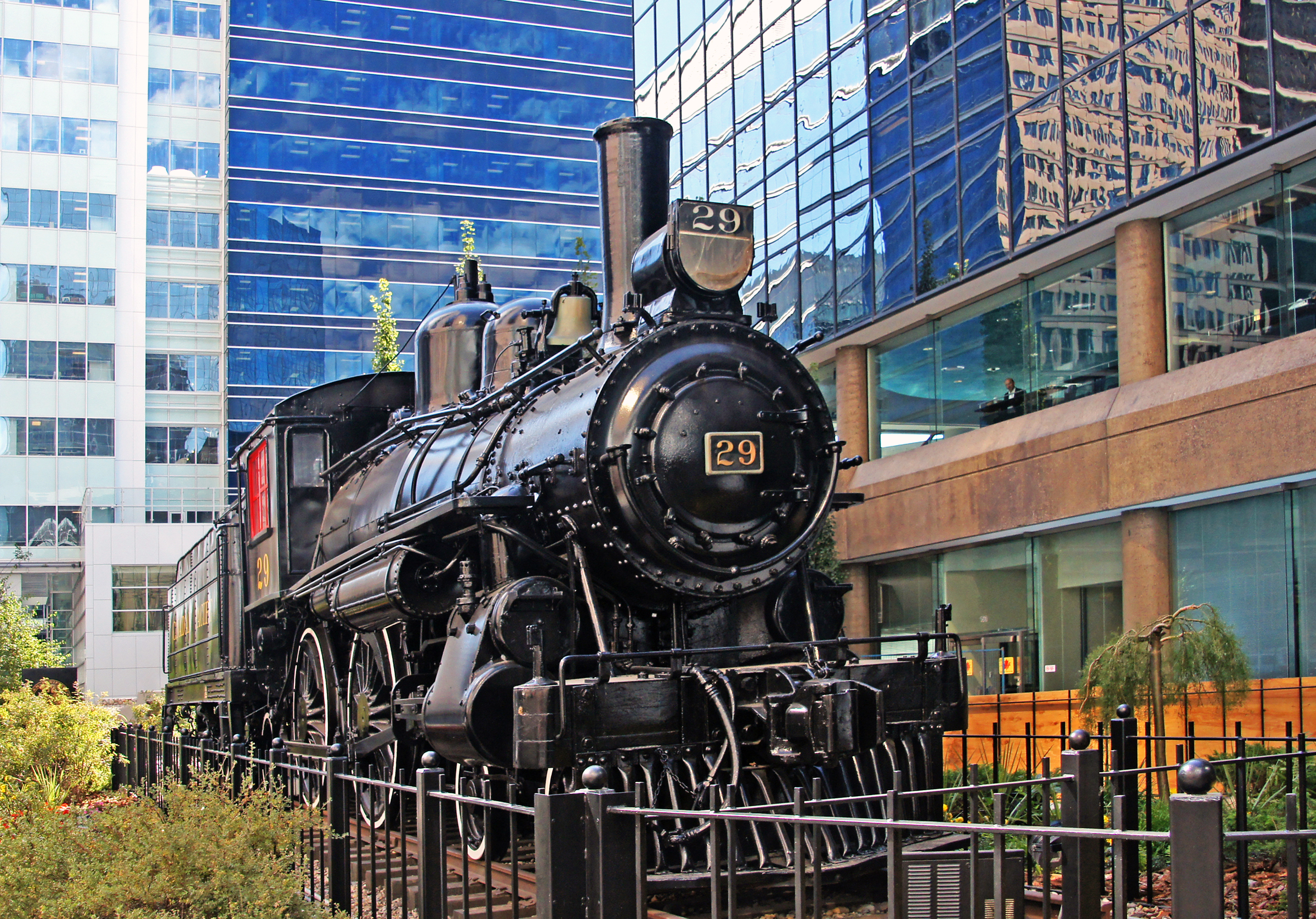
No. 29 on static display in front of the CPR's headquarters in Calgary, Alberta, 2012, five years before the locomotive would be moved to Ogden yard.

In July of the following year, 1988, No. 1009 was sidelined after losing a tire and breaking a spoke on the rear driving wheel on the fireman's side, but No. 29 had been reworked around the same time. Subsequently, for three weeks, the 4-4-0 filled in for No. 1009 to take part in a push-pull train operation with MLW RS-1 unit No. 8208 at the other end. On Labor Day weekend of 1988, the New Brunswick Division hosted the annual Canadian Railroad Historical Association (CRHA) convention, and on that Sunday, Numbers 29 and 1009 performed another double header. Later that same month, Numbers 29 and 1009 performed another double header in favor of the pensioners of CPR, CN, and Via Rail, and almost 200 pensioners attended the event. No. 29's last excursion run occurred in 1989 to be filmed for a video by Greg Scholl. This was the first and only time No. 29 pulled a passenger train unassisted since its last run for the CPR back in 1960. Throughout the early 1990s, No. 29 remained sidelined, and employees would repair some leaking tubes, and the S&H had the hopes of bringing No. 29 back for limited excursion service for the 1995 season.

On Friday September 16, 1994, the S&H's locomotive shed was burned down as a result of an arson attack, damaging No. 29 inside, along with two diesel locomotives (Numbers 8208 and 209), a rare wooden business car, eight other passenger cars, and most of the S&H's tools, spare parts, and historical records. When employees inspected the damage, critical damage was discovered on No. 29; the locomotive became begrimed with sooty residue, the wood trim inside the cab was burned off, and the paint is seared down to the bare metal. Crews feared that No. 29 would be damaged beyond economical repair, but when Ed Bowes and another employee inspected the locomotive, they found relieving results. They climbed into the cab and tried out the levers, the throttle, the Johnson bar, the reversing control, the brakes, and other cab controls, and they were all still functional. They inspected the metal for sags and warps, and none were found. They refilled the evaporated oil in its wheel-bearing journals, replaced the heat-warped rails in front of it, and towed it to another sideline. It rolled smoothly without any seized bearings. Ed Bowes explained that the A1e was never within the hottest part of the fire, so it should have been salvageable. It was concluded that the locomotive could still be cosmetically restored for static display purposes, and if it were to be operationally restored, it would only be more costly. While the S&H was debating on whether to operationally repair No. 29 or not, the locomotive was sprayed with rust-preventing oil for the time being.

=== Current status ===
In 1996, the CPR moved its head office from Windsor Station in Montreal to 9th Avenue Gulf Canada Square near the Calgary Tower and Palliser Hotel in Calgary, Alberta. Since they saw the historical significance and revenue in No. 29, the company decided to reacquire the A1e for static display in front of their new headquarters. No. 29 was removed from S&H property by truck on June 3 of that year. The locomotive was soon sent to the Winnipeg's Weston Shops to undergo a thorough cosmetic restoration to become presentable to the general public. Then, two cranes lifted it onto its new display platform at Gulf Canada Square. The CPR's president and CEO, Robert J. Ritchie, rededicated the steam locomotive following the official move of the company's quarters on September 9, 1996. No. 29 would spend the next twenty-one years on static display in front of the CPR's head office to represent the railroad's heritage.

In 2012, the CPR moved their headquarters again to Ogden yard, which was on the other side of Calgary, but they would not move No. 29 to the same location until five years later. On Saturday, June 18, 2017, traffic on 9th Avenue was closed, while two cranes lifted No. 29 off of its display site at Gulf Canada Square, and then the locomotive was moved via truck to the nearest rail line to be towed to Ogden. Before returning to its static display status, No. 29 was sent to receive another cosmetic restoration, and that was part of a larger restoration plan at the CPR's new head office campus. As of 2023, No. 29 remains on static display in front of CPKC’s (CPR’s successor) current head office next to EMD Fp7a No. 1400.

== Historical significance ==
No. 29 is one of only three remaining 4-4-0s on the Canadian Pacific Railway's active roster in the 1950s. It was also the last steam locomotive to pull a revenue train for the CPR. No. 29 is the sole survivor of the CPR's A-1e class.
