= Canadian Pacific 7000 =

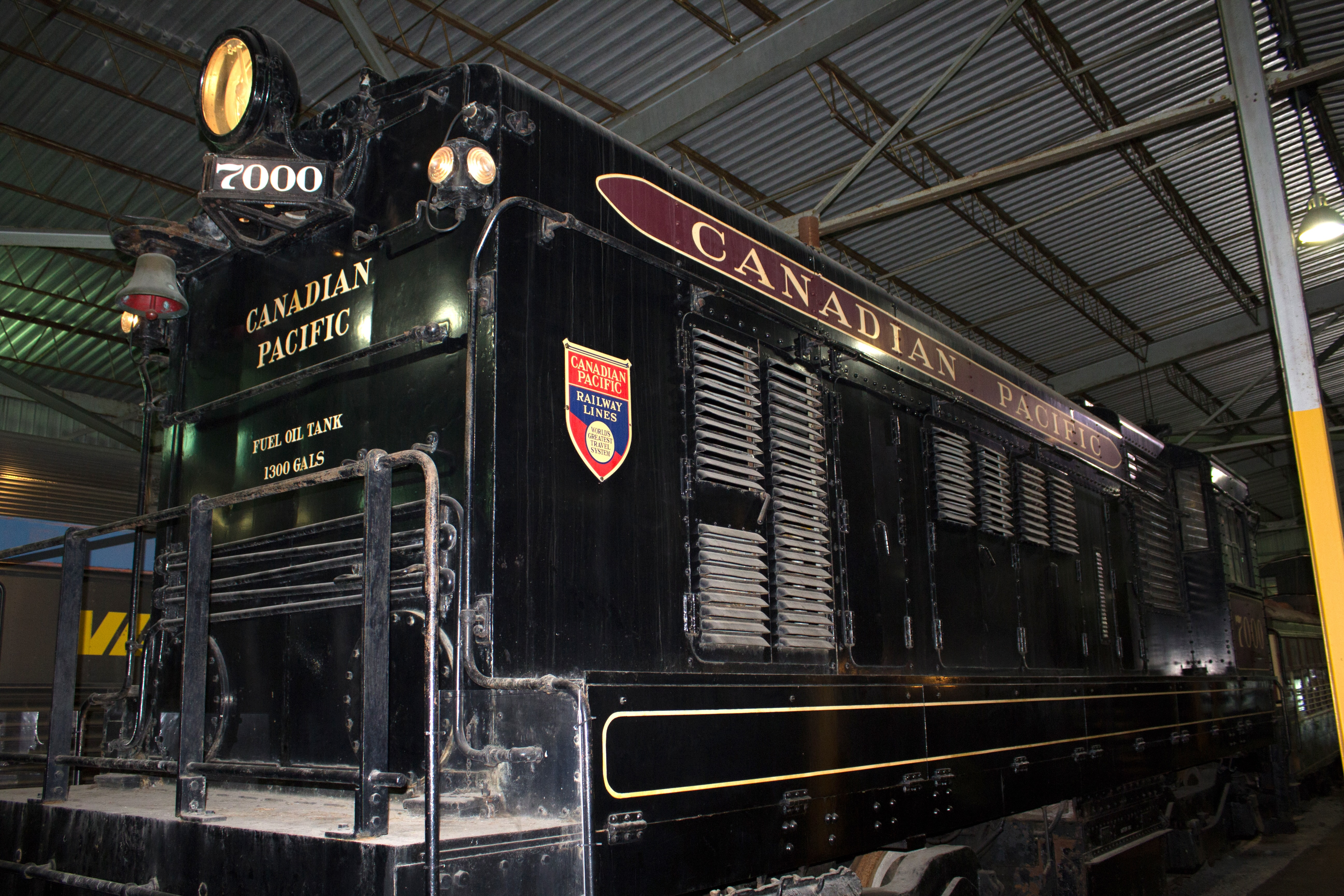
- Canadian Pacific No. 7000 on display at the Canadian Railway Museum in Saint-Constant, Quebec in June 2018.
Type and origin
- Power type: Two-stroke diesel-electric
- Builder: National Steel Car for Stone Franklin of Canada Ltd, Montreal
- Build date: 1937
- Total produced: 1
Specifications
- Configuration
  - AAR: B-B
  - UIC: Bo′Bo′
- Gauge: 4 ft 8 1/2 in (1,435 mm) standard gauge
- Loco weight: 245,000 lb (111,130 kg)
- Prime mover: New: Harland and Wolff; later: Caterpillar
- Engine type: Diesel
- Cylinder size: Six
Performance figures
- Maximum speed: 30 mph (48 km/h)
- Power output: 550 hp (410 kW)
Career
- Operators: Canadian Pacific Railway; Marathon Paper
- Numbers: CP 7000
- Retired: 1964
- Disposition: Preserved (display)

Canadian Pacific Railway 7000 is a diesel-electric locomotive ordered through Stone Franklin of Canada Ltd of Montreal and built by National Steel Car in Hamilton, Ontario, in 1937. One example was built for the Canadian Pacific Railway, a custom built one-of-a-kind unit using British Empire components to avoid heavy customs duties. It is preserved at the Canadian Railway Museum.

== History ==
The locomotive was an early Canadian Pacific diesel. Before it was delivered in November 1937, the railway had only used self-propelled rail motor cars. The unit was ordered in 1935 from Stone Franklin of Canada Ltd of Montreal but was built by National Steel Car in Hamilton, Ontario. It used a 6-cylinder, 600-horsepower (450 kW) diesel prime-mover from Harland & Wolff of Belfast, Northern Ireland, with electrical equipment by Laurence Scott and Electromotors of Norwich, England. CP 7000 was a double-truck, four-motored switching locomotive. It cost $89,500 when built.

The locomotive worked at the Hochelaga Yard in Montreal until Alco S-2 units arrived at the Yard in 1943. It was then leased to Marathon Paper Mills Ltd., in Peninsula (now Marathon), Ontario, for a period of 3–4 months before being purchased by the mill in October 1944. It operated for many years without a number until it was re-engined in 1951 with a 600-horsepower Caterpillar diesel engine. It was removed from service in 1964 at the paper mill and offered to the Canadian Railway Museum in 1965, where it remains.
