= Canadian Railway Museum =

The Canadian Railway Museum Exporail
- Le Musée ferroviaire canadien Exporail
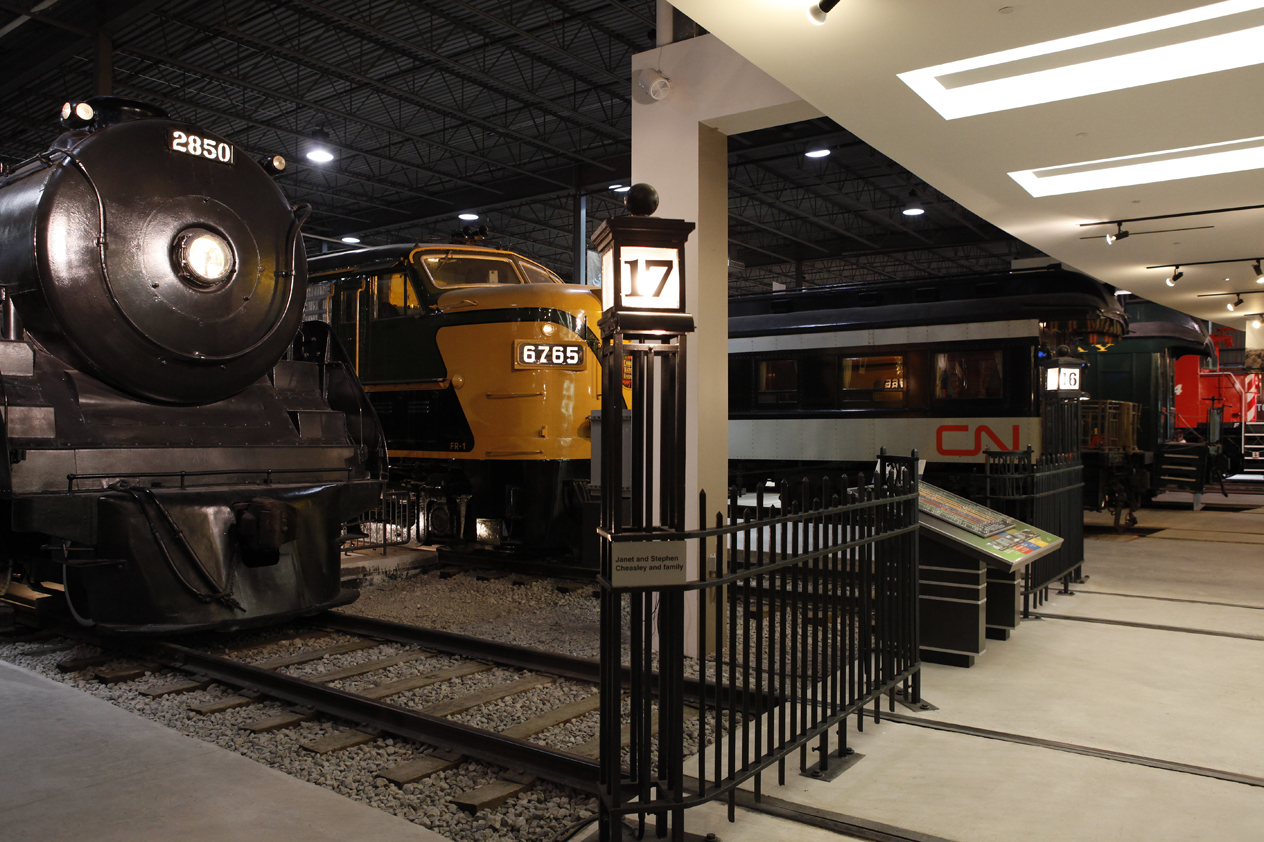

- Location within southern Quebec
- Established: 1961
- Location: Saint-Constant, Quebec, Canada
- Coordinates: 45.375°N 73.564°W
- Type: Railway museum
- Collection size: 160 vehicles, 190,000 documents and artifacts, 10,000 small artifacts, a centennial railway station, 690 model trains
- Visitors: 47,326 (2011-12)
- Director: Marie-Claude Reid
- President: C. Stephen Cheasley
- Owner: Canadian Railroad Historical Association
- Website: exporail.org

The Canadian Railway Museum (French: (Le) Musée ferroviaire canadien), operating under the brand name Exporail in both official languages, is a rail transport museum in Saint-Constant, Quebec, Canada, on Montreal's south shore.

== Collection ==
Established in 1961 by its owner and operator, the Canadian Railroad Historical Association, the museum maintains the largest collection of railway equipment in Canada with over 140 pieces of rolling stock. There are also over 250,000 objects and documents from Canada's railway history in the collection which is maintained in the archives on the property.

The museum operates a heritage streetcar line around the grounds as well as a heritage railway which pulls a small passenger train on a former freight spur to Montée des Bouleaux. The streetcar operates daily during the spring, summer and fall while the railway operates every Sunday during the same period.

Three engines that did not operate in service in Canada but have a 'Canadian connection' are SNCF 030-841 3-030.C.841, LB&SCR A1 class 54 Waddon & LNER Class A4 4489 Dominion of Canada, two of which are British in origin and the third is French.

The museum underwent a significant expansion during the 2000s when the Angus Exhibit Pavilion opened. Some of the most valuable items were placed in the new pavilion, which became the main exhibition building.

One of the most notable artifacts is former Canadian Pacific locomotive #2850, with a 4-6-4 wheel arrangement, known as a "Hudson type". In 1939, this particular locomotive was responsible for pulling the Royal train carrying King George VI and Queen Elizabeth on the westbound leg of their trip across Canada. Because of this, #2850 and all engines of its class (H1c/H1d #2820-2859, H1e #2860-2864), were redesignated as Royal Hudsons. This did not include the H1a/H1b classes #2800-2819.

=== Steam locomotives ===
Railroad	Configuration	Class	Number	Notes
Canadian National Railway	2-10-2	T2a	No. 4100	
Canadian National Railway	4-6-2	K2b	No. 5550	
Canadian National Railway	4-6-4	K5a	No. 5702	
Canadian National Railway	4-8-4	U2c	No. 6153	
Canadian Pacific Railway	4-4-0	A2q	No. 144	
Canadian Pacific Railway	4-6-2	G-3	No. 2341	
Canadian Pacific Railway	4-6-4	H1e	No. 2850	
Canadian Pacific Railway	4-4-4	F1a	No. 2928	Undergoing cosmetic restoration
Canadian Pacific Railway	2-10-4	T1c	No. 5935	
London Brighton and South Coast Railway, UK	0-6-0	A1 Terrier	LB&SCR A1 class Terrier number 54 Waddon	This locomotive was donated by British Railways, the former state-owned rail company in the United Kingdom.
London and North Eastern Railway, UK	4-6-2	A4	4489 Dominion of Canada	This locomotive was once on display for a two-year hiatus at the National Railway Museum in York, England.
SNCF, France	0-6-0	030-841	3-030.C.841	
Grand Trunk Railway New England Lines	2-6-0	Mogul	No. 713	

=== Diesel locomotives ===
Manufacturer	Model	Class	Number	Notes
Canadian Locomotive Company			Canadian National 77	Donated 1968
Montreal Locomotive Works	FPA-4		Canadian National 6765	Donated 1968
Montreal Locomotive Works	FA-1		Canadian National 9400	The 9400 was transferred to the Exporail site in 1989 and restored in 2000.
C.E. Brooks	Rail Motor Car		Canadian National 15824	Retired in 1964
Montreal Locomotive Works	RS-18	MR-18c	Canadian National 3684	Acquired in 1992
Montreal Locomotive Works	C-424	DRS-24c	CP Rail 4237	Retired in 1998
Montreal Locomotive Works	M-630	DRF-30d	CP Rail 4563	Retired in 1994
Montreal Locomotive Works	M-640	DRF-36d	CP Rail 4744	Acquired in 1998
Stone Franklin	Switcher		Canadian Pacific 7000	Acquired in 1965
Montreal Locomotive Works	S-2	DS-10h	Canadian Pacific 7077	Acquired in 1985
Canadian Locomotive Company	H-24-66	DRS-24c	Canadian Pacific 8905	Retired in 1976
General Motors Diesel	GP-9RM		AMT 1311	Acquired in 2011
Plymouth			Gatineau Power Company 12012	Acquired in 1972
Railpower	Green Kid		RPRX 2003	
Montreal Locomotive Works	RS-2		Roberval & Saguenay 20	
Montreal Locomotive Works	M420W		SLQ 3569	Retired in 2003
Bombardier	LRC		VIA 6921	Retired in 2001
GMD	SD40-2		Canadian Pacific 5903	Retired in 2018

== Images ==
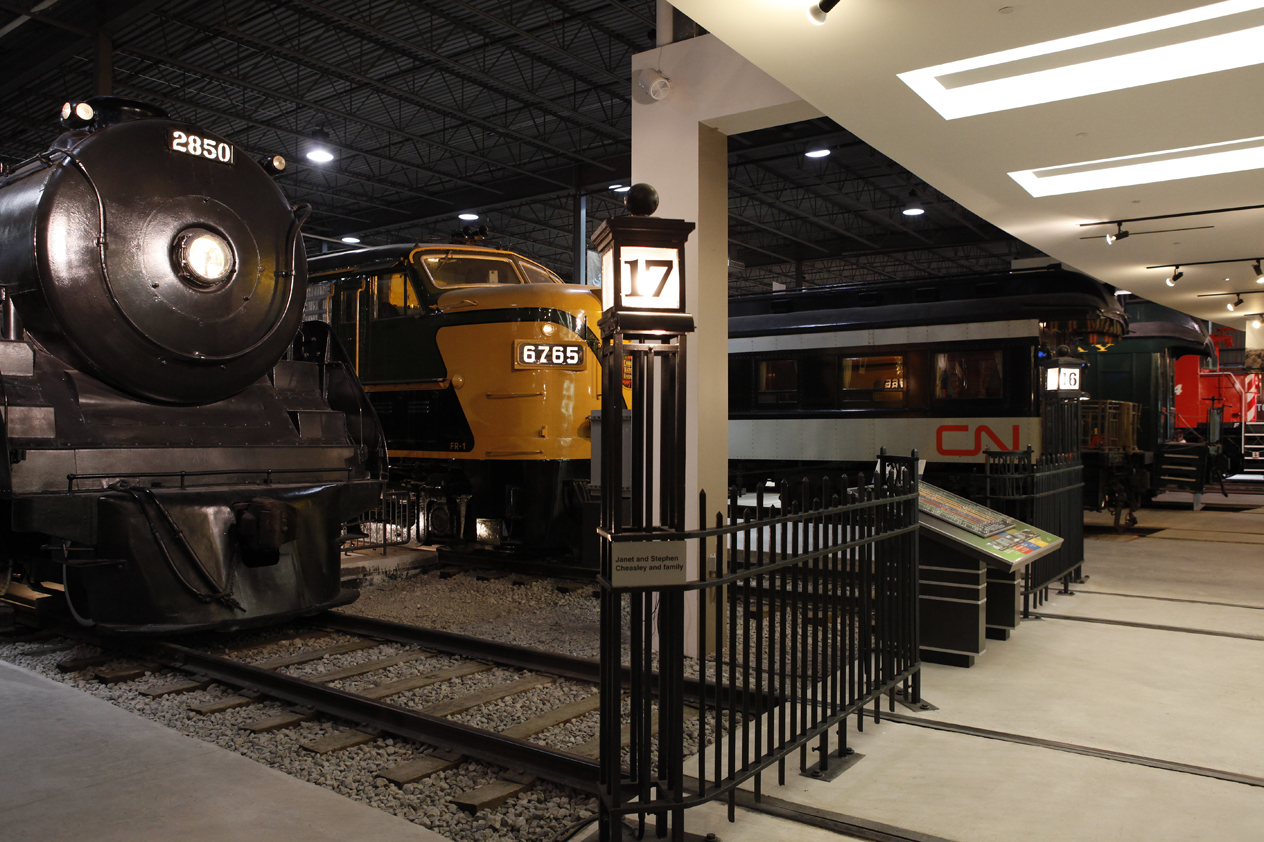
Historical Trains Preserved at Canadian Railway Museum

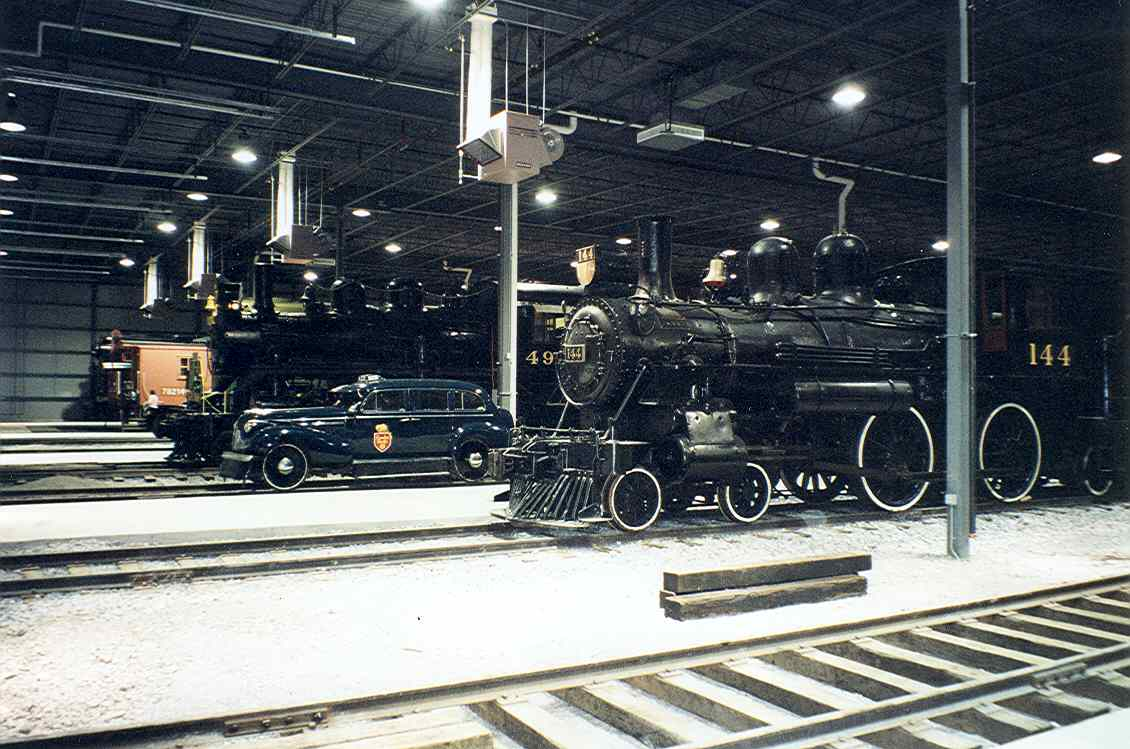
Main Pavilion CPR locomotive no. 144

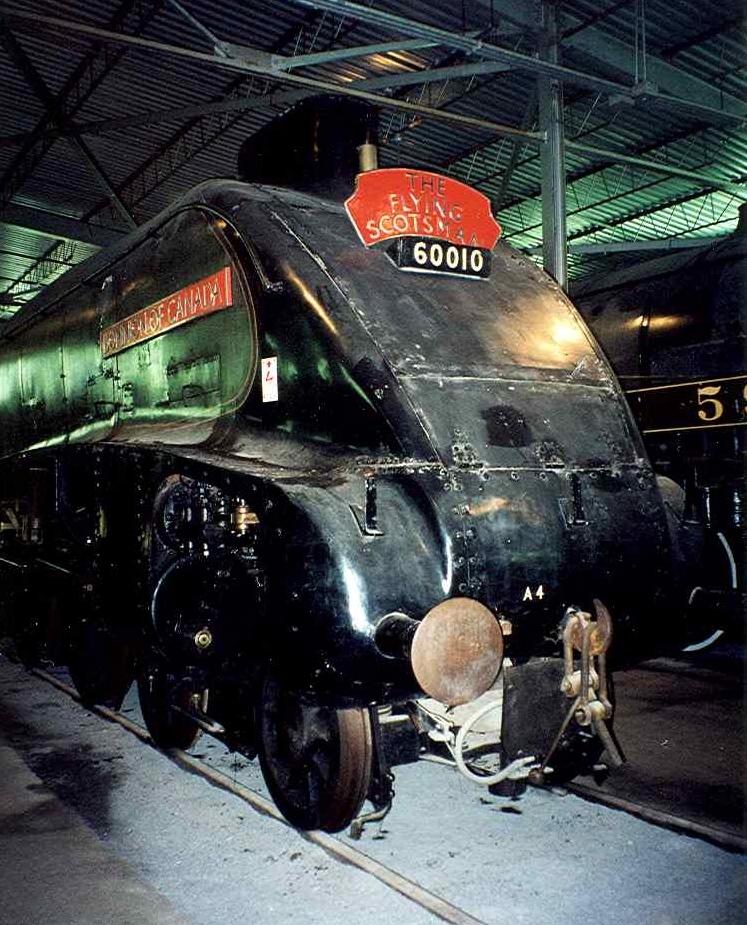
LNER Class A4 Dominion of Canada

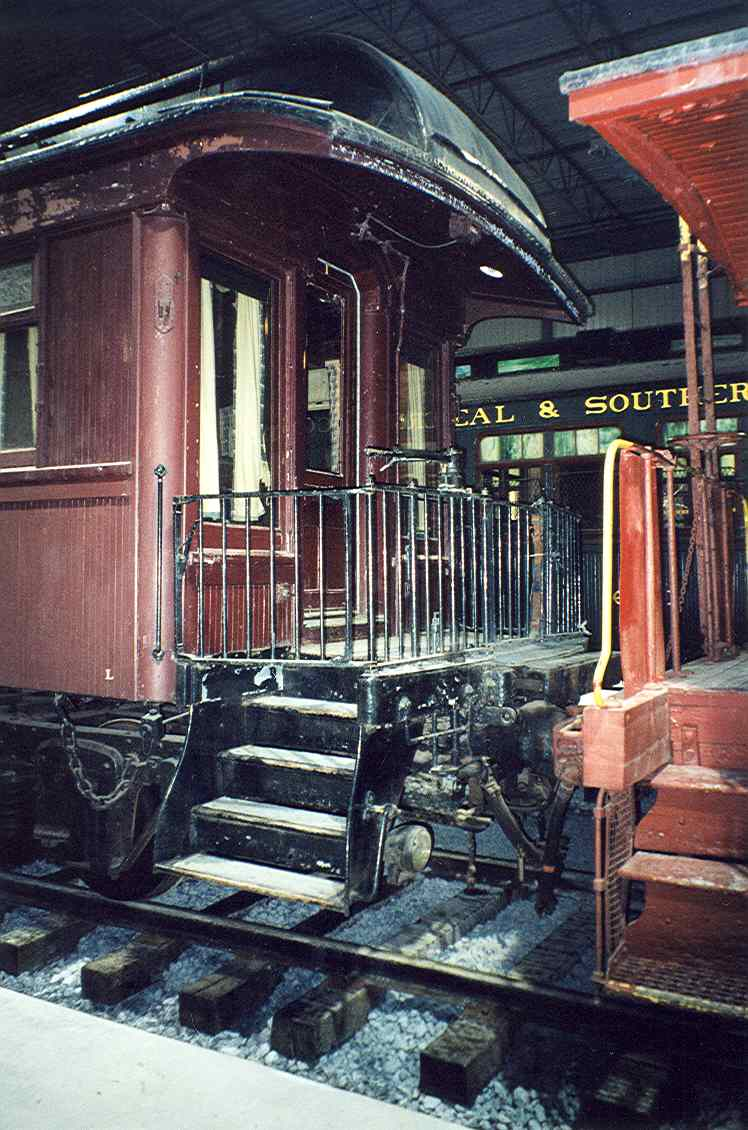
Pullman Cars

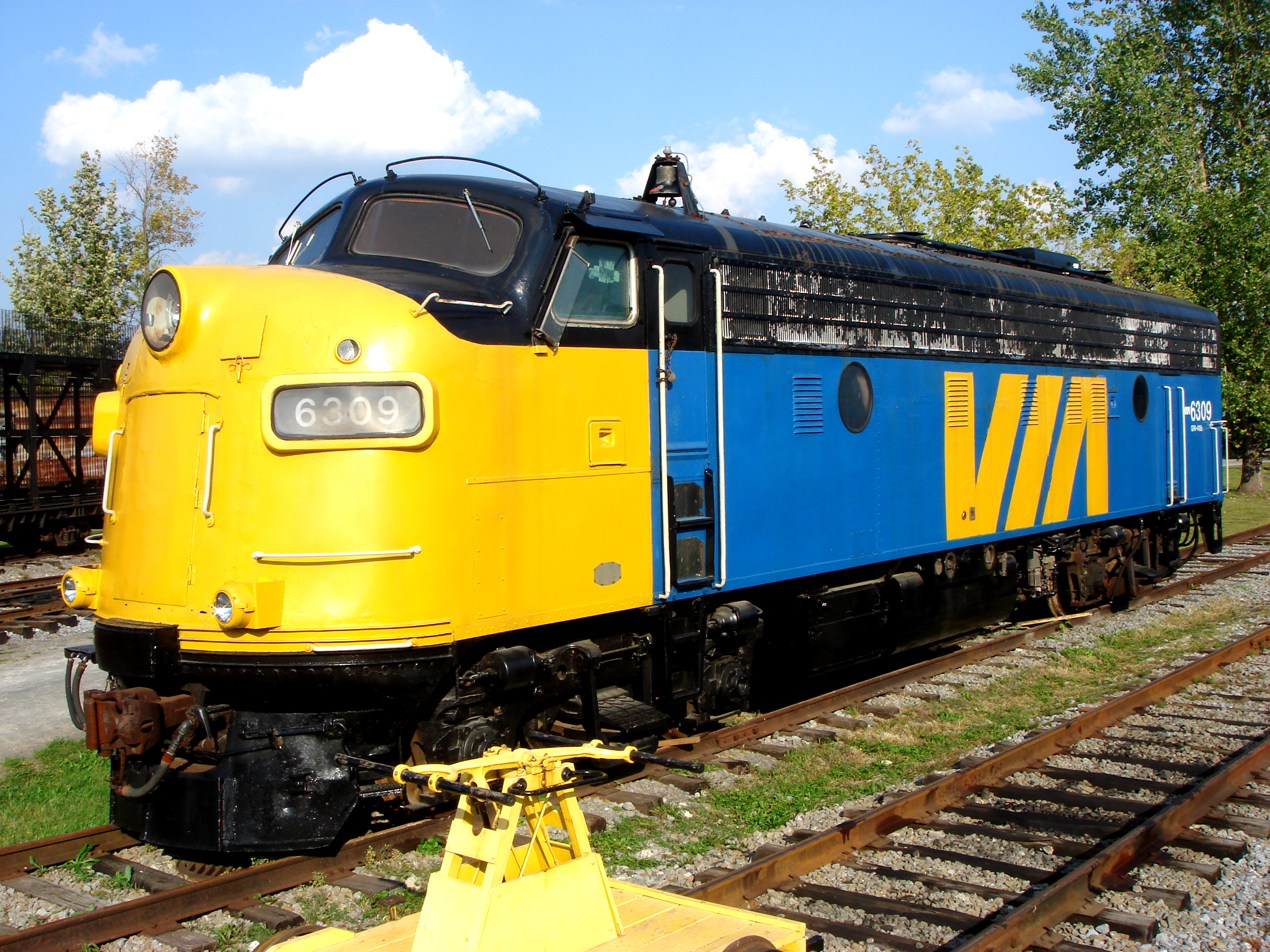
Via Rail FP9ARM #6309 undergoing restoration at the museum

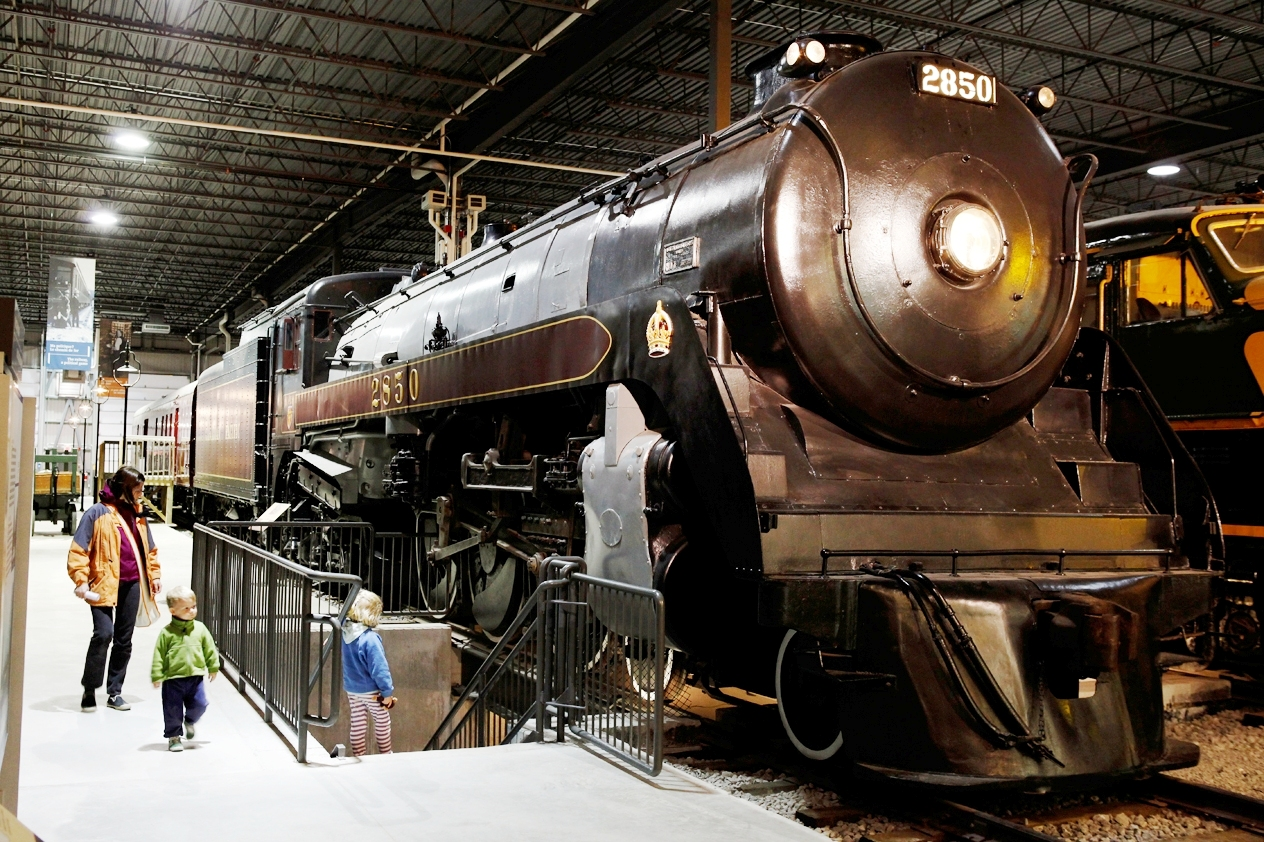
CP Royal Hudson #2850, Canadian Railway Museum

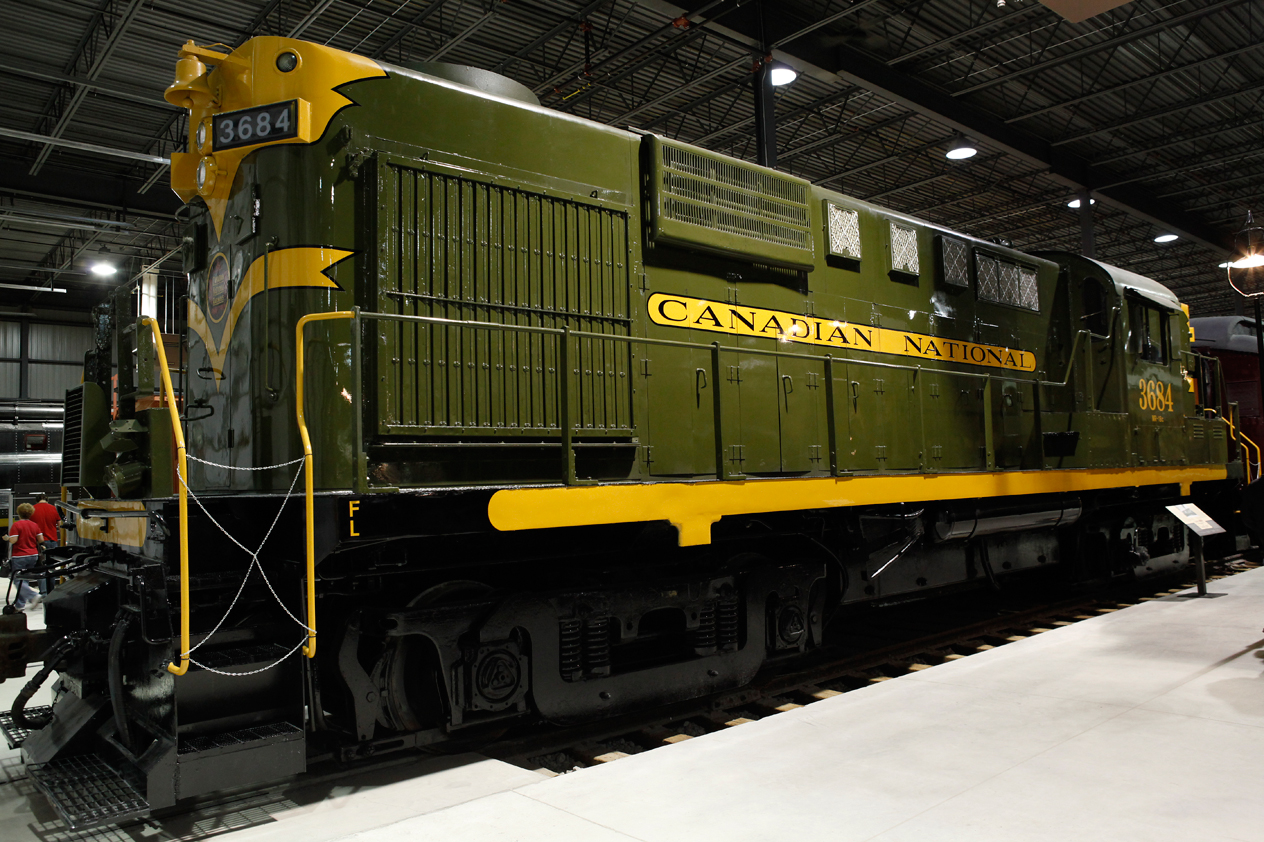
CN #3684, an MLW-built Alco RS18 at the Canadian Railway Museum

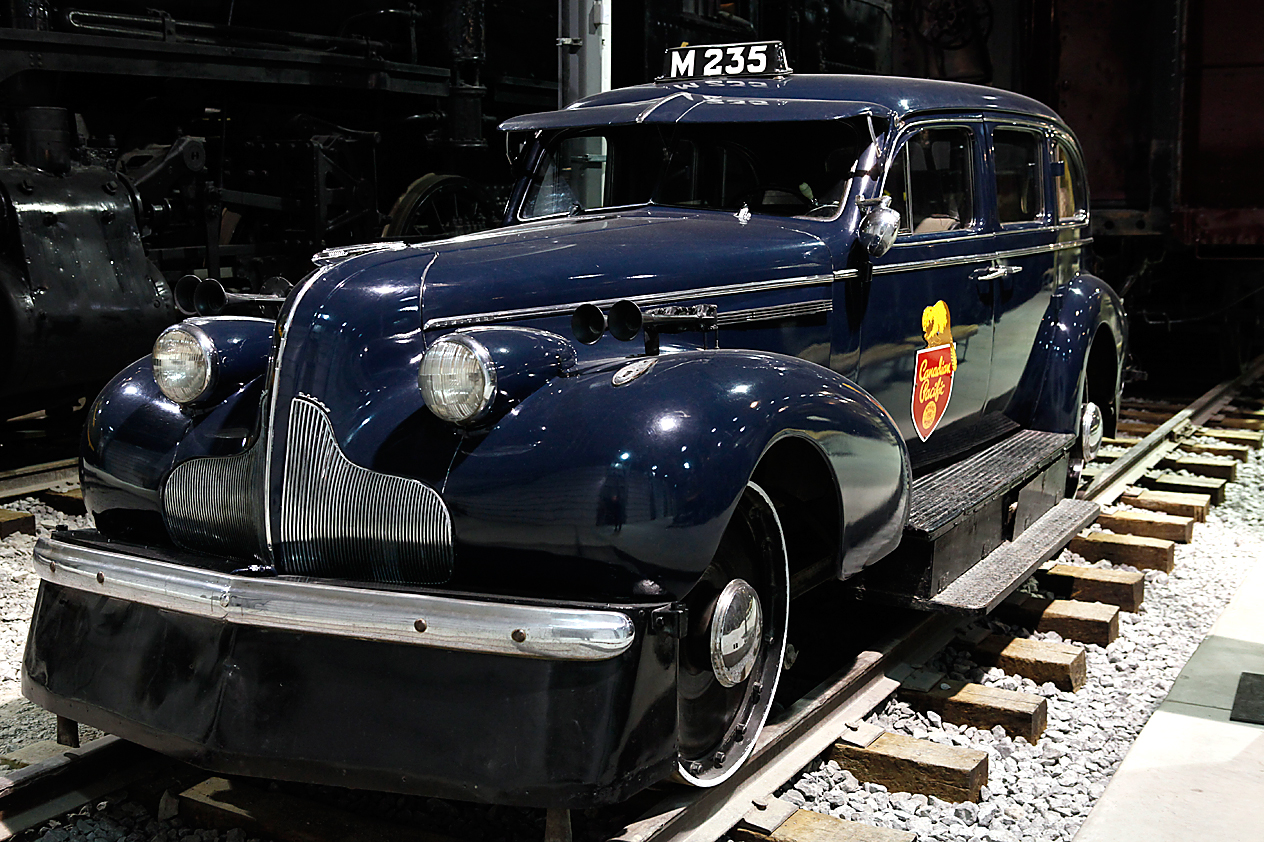
Canadian Pacific '39 Buick, M235, Canadian Railway Museum

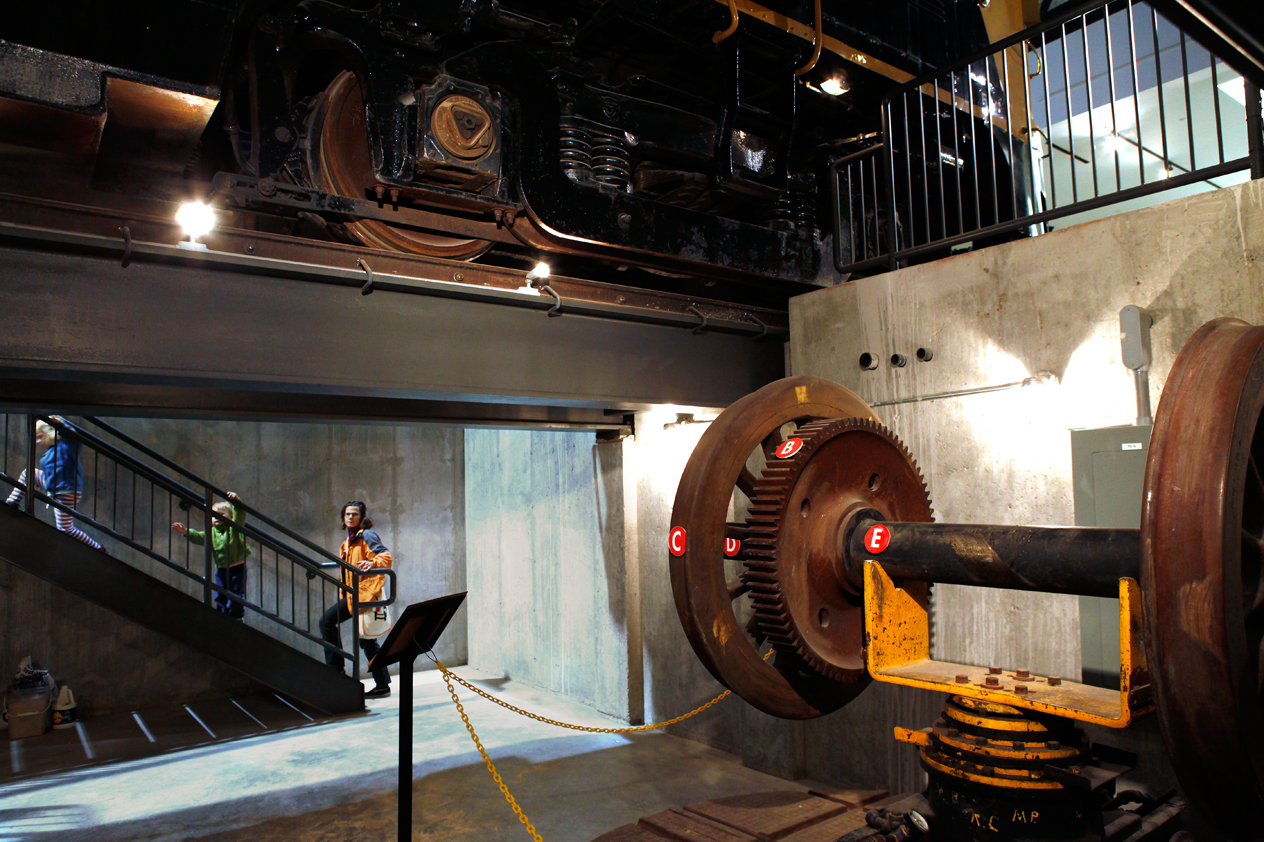
Engine Undercarriage Exhibit, Canadian Railway Museum

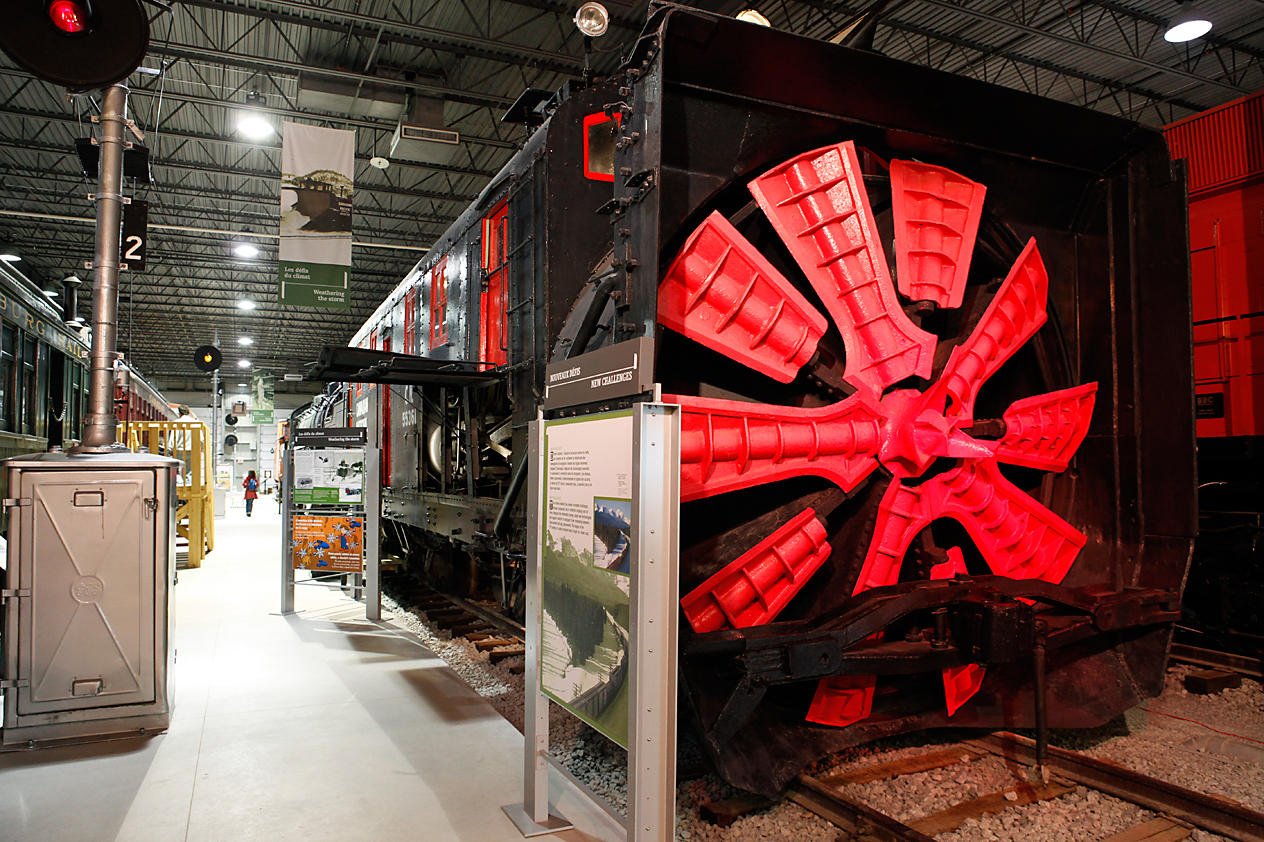
Rotary Snowplow at Canadian Railway Museum

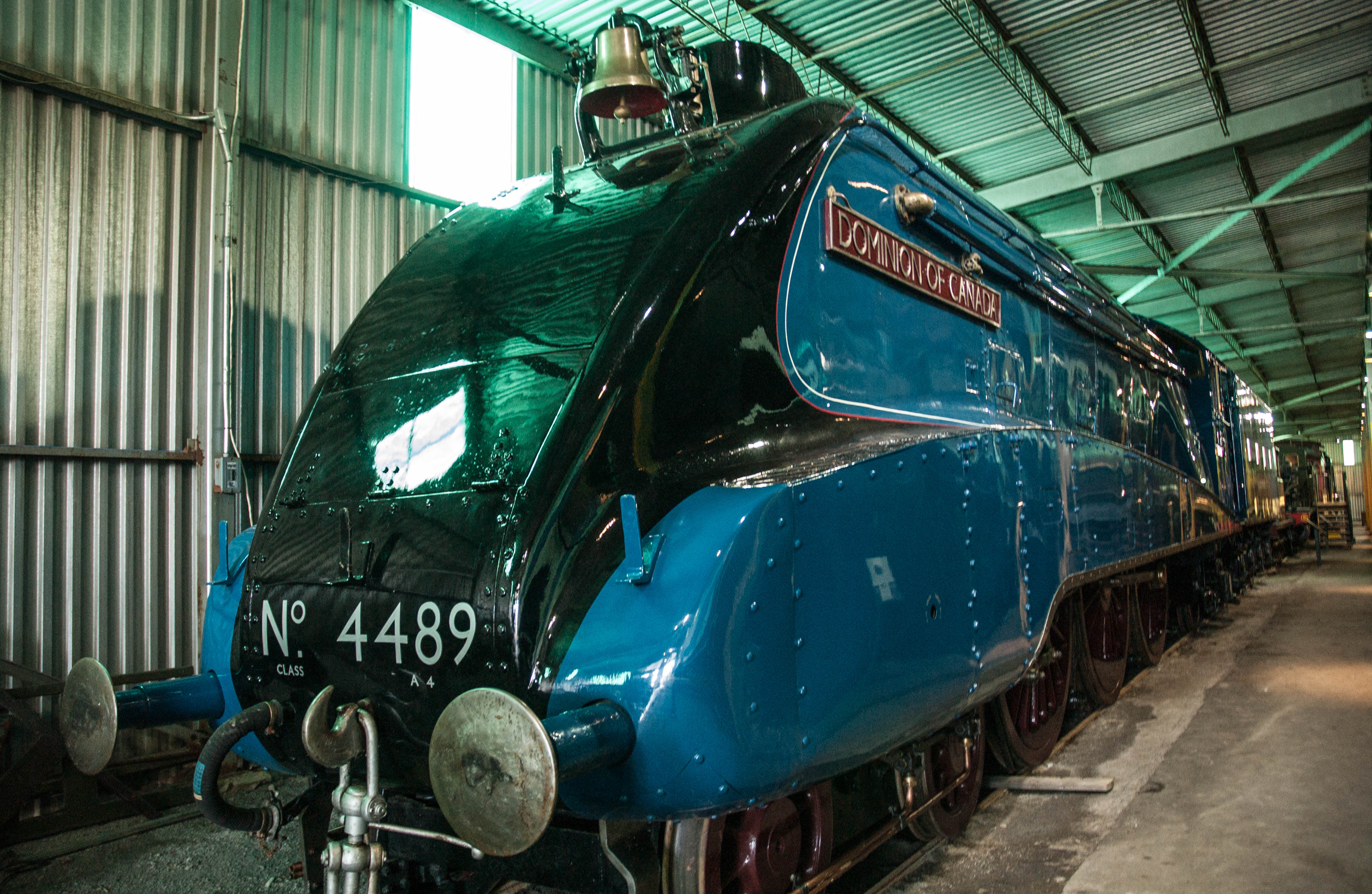
Dominion of Canada in her restored livery, 2014

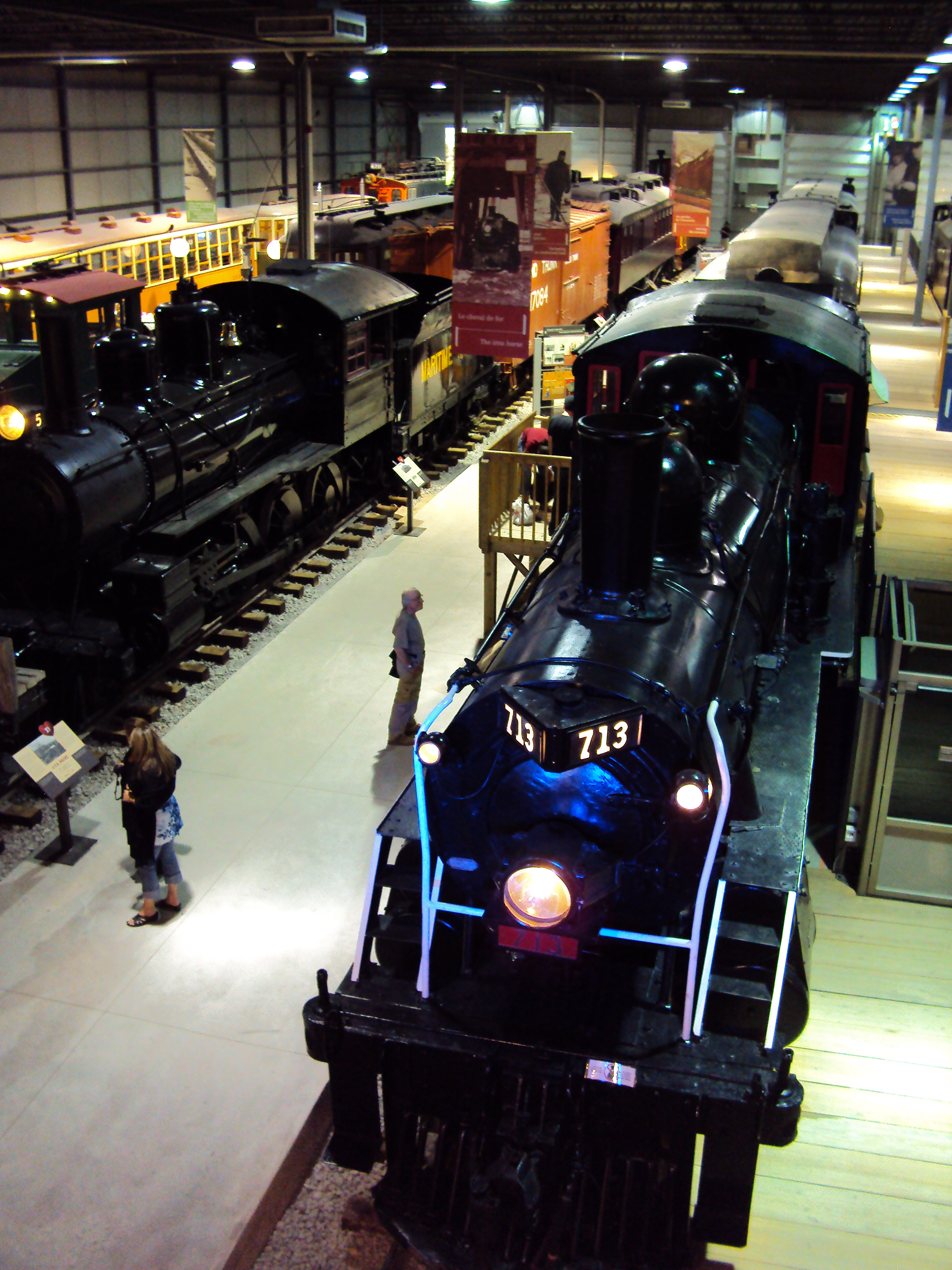
Grand Trunk Western "Mogul" No. 713

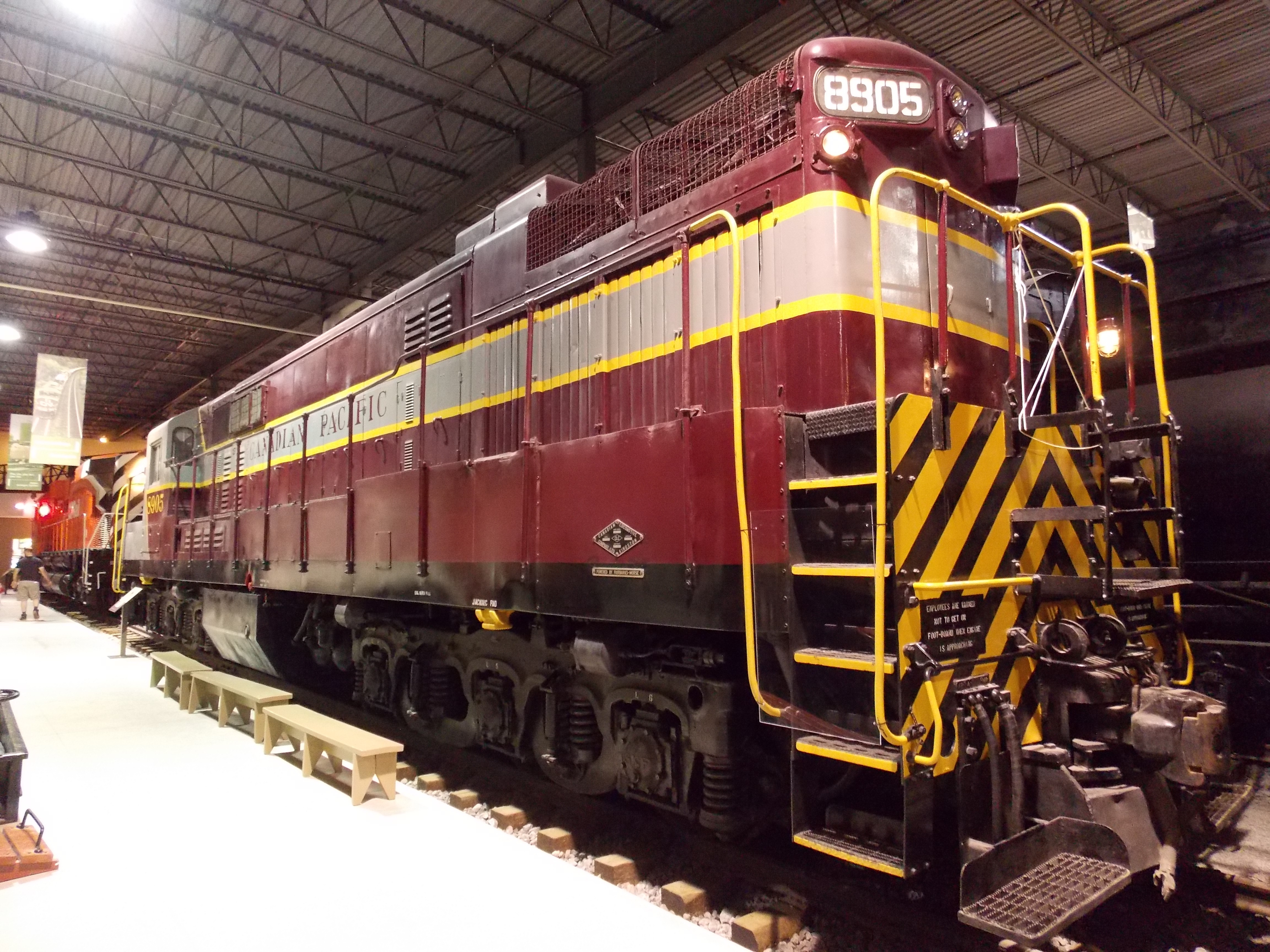
Canadian Pacific H24-66 #8905 at Exporail (July 2017)

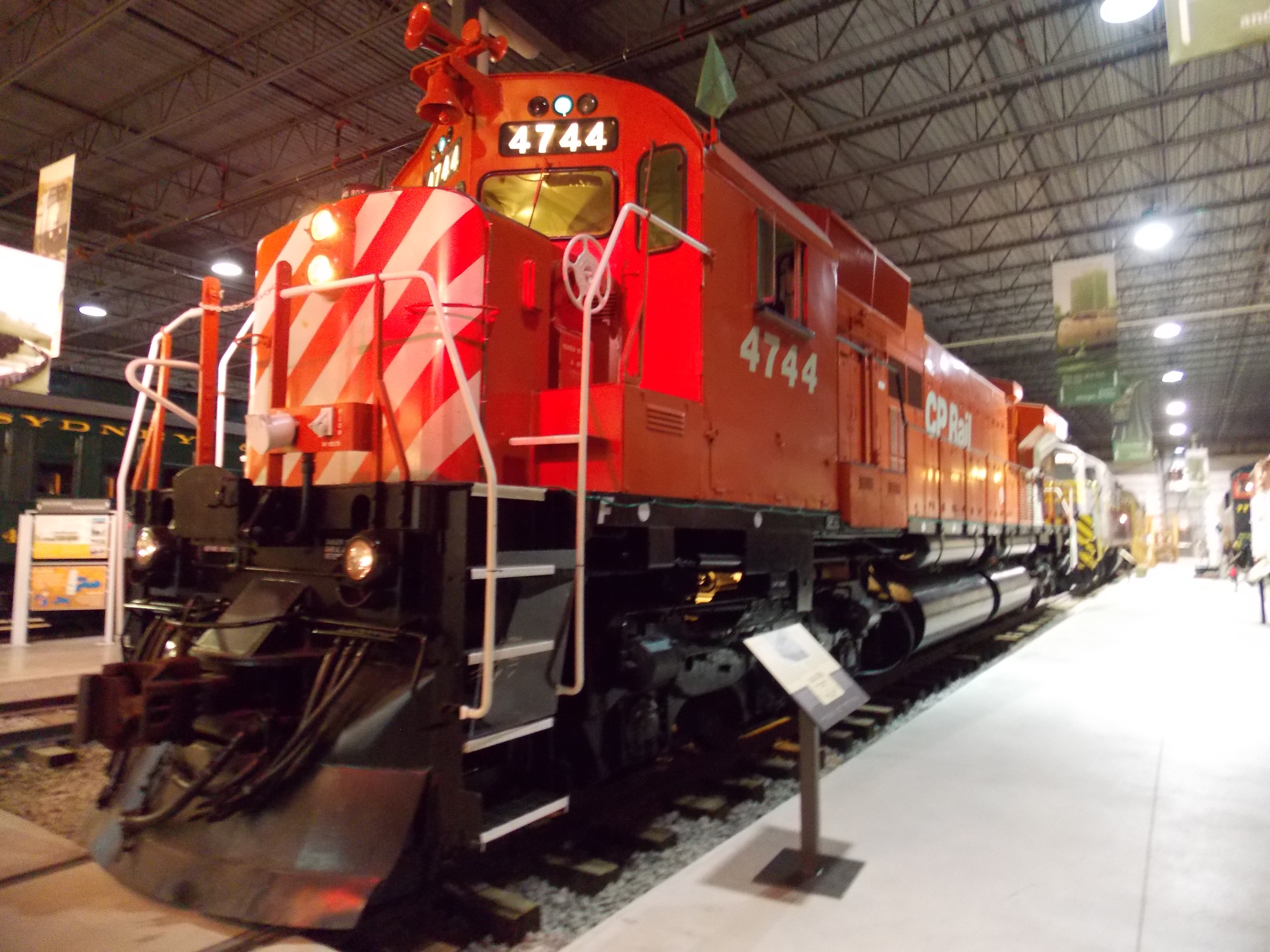
CP Rail M-640 #4744 at Exporail (July 2017)

== See also ==
- List of heritage railways in Canada
- List of museums in Canada
- Canadian National
- Canadian Pacific Railway
- B&O Railroad Museum (US)
- Locomotion: the National Railway Museum at Shildon (UK)
- Nuremberg Transport Museum (Germany)
- Workshops Rail Museum (Australia)
