= Canadian Railroad Historical Association =

Railway historical society in Canada

- Abbreviation: CRHA
- Founded: 1932
- Type: Non-Profit
- Purpose: To encourage and facilitate research and interpretation of Canadian railway history.
- Location: Saint-Constant, Quebec
- Coordinates: 45.37530°N 73.56466°W
- Website: exporail.org/en/the-association/

The Canadian Railroad Historical Association (CRHA) (French: L'Association canadienne d'histoire ferroviaire (ACHF)) is a non-profit organization established in 1932 in Canada and is "devoted to preserving and interpreting Canada's railway heritage, which its founders and members have safeguarded from coast to coast." It is headquartered in Saint-Constant, Quebec and organized into 5 divisions located across the country.

The CRHA has owned and operated the Canadian Railway Museum, branded as ExpoRail, since 1961. It also publishes the Canadian Rail magazine since 1937, which includes historical articles and photographs of Canadian railways. It is currently published quarterly.

== Local divisions ==
- Calgary & Southwestern Division (covering Alberta and the prairies)
- Esquimalt & Nanaimo Division (covering Vancouver Island)
- Kingston Division (covering eastern Ontario)
- Niagara Division (covering southwestern Ontario)
- Pacific Coast Division (covering mainland British Columbia)

=== Former divisions ===
- Charny Division (covering Quebec)
- New Brunswick Division (covering New Brunswick and the Atlantic provinces)
- Prince George-Nechako-Fraser Division (covering central British Columbia)
- Rideau Valley Division (covering Eastern Ontario)
- Selkirk Division (covering eastern British Columbia)
- St. Lawrence Valley Division (covering Quebec)
- Toronto & York Division (covering central Ontario)
- Vallée-Jonction Division (covering central Quebec)
