= MLW M-640 =

Single prototype 4000 hp diesel locomotive

MLW M-640 (CP RAIL)
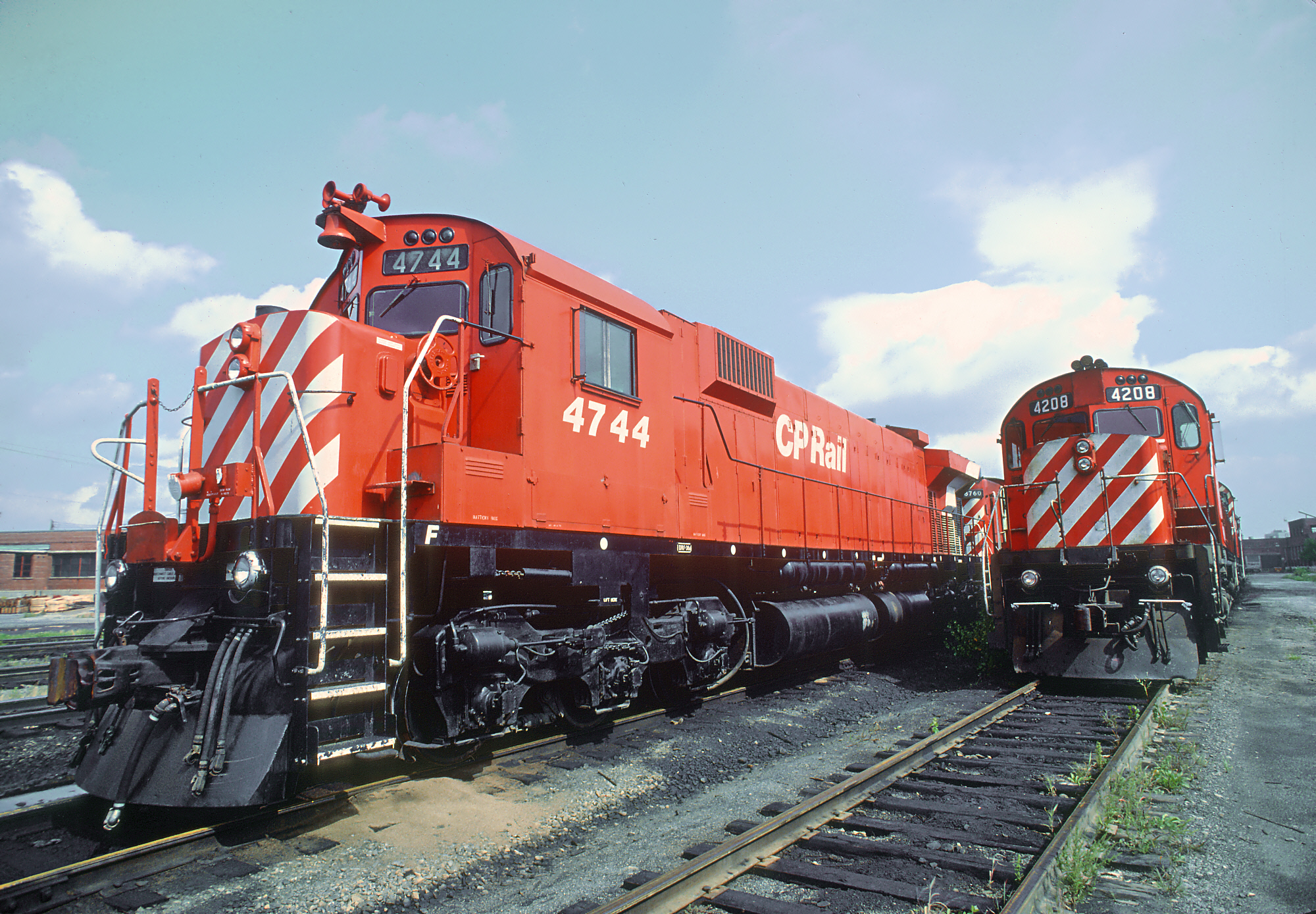
Type and origin
- Power type: Diesel-electric
- Designer: American Locomotive Company
- Builder: Montreal Locomotive Works
- Order number: 4917
- Serial number: 6032-01
- Model: M-640
- Build date: March 1971
- Total produced: 1
Specifications
- Configuration
  - AAR: C-C (1971-1984); A1A-A1A (1984-present)
- Gauge: 4 ft 8 1/2 in (1,435 mm) standard gauge
- Prime mover: MLW 18-251F
Performance figures
- Maximum speed: 120 km/h (75 mph)
- Power output: 4,000 hp (2,980 kW)
Career
- Operators: Canadian Pacific Railway
- Class: DRF-36d
- Numbers: 4744
- Retired: 1998
- Current owner: Canadian Railway Museum
- Disposition: On static display

The MLW M-640 (also known as Canadian Pacific 4744 or CP Rail 4744) is a 4,000 horsepower (3,000 kilowatts) six-axle diesel-electric locomotive built by the Montreal Locomotive Works in March of 1971 for the Canadian Pacific Railway (CP Rail).

== History ==
=== Revenue service ===
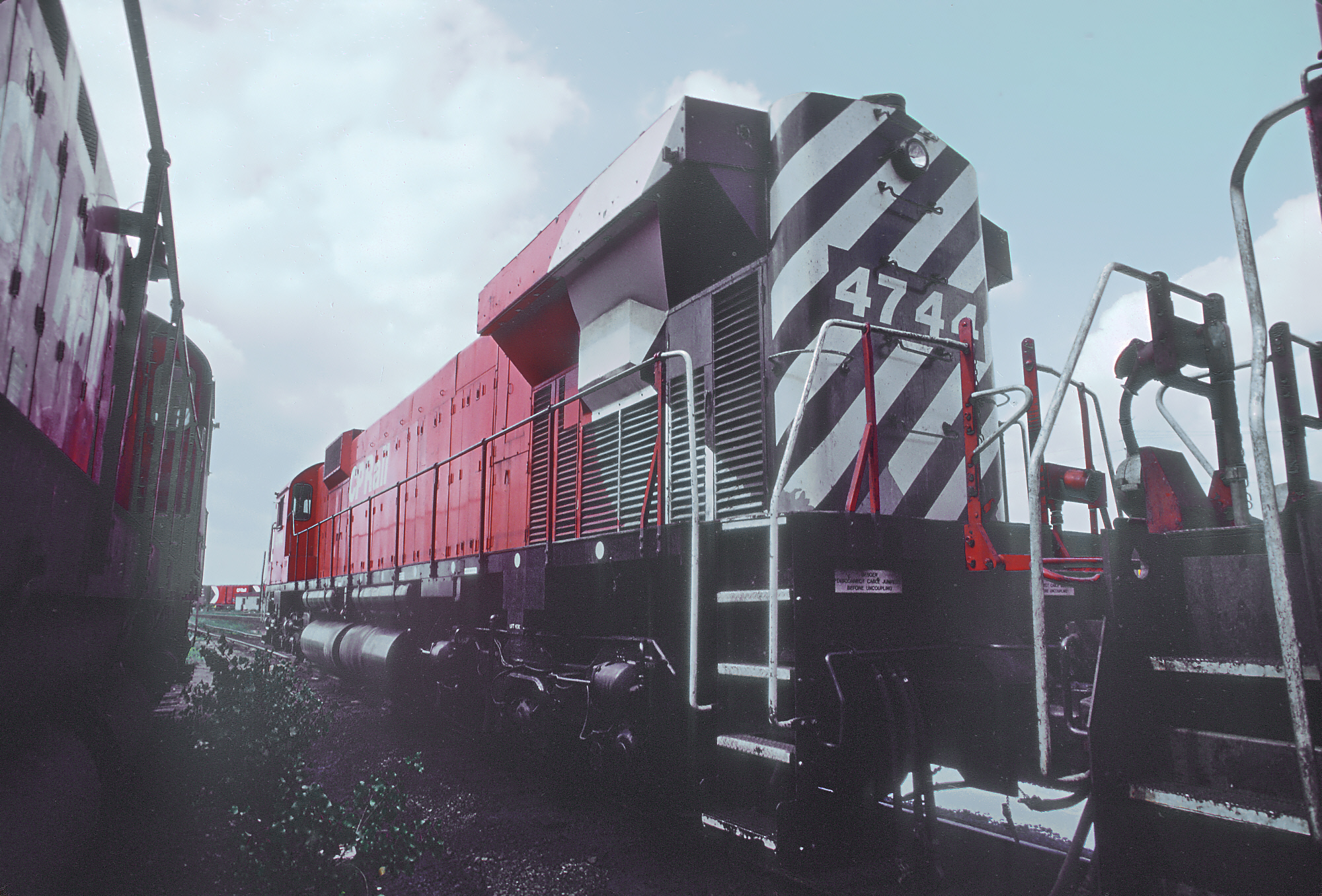
CP #4744 at Montreal's St Luc Yard in September of 1979

The MLW M-640 was manufactured in March 1971 by the Montreal Locomotive Works and it was delivered to the Canadian Pacific Railway that same year in 1971 where it was numbered by the Canadian Pacific as #4744.

The locomotive utilized an ALCO/MLW 18-cylinder 251F prime mover so that the Montreal Locomotive Works could achieve 4,000 horsepower (3,000 kilowatts; 3.0 megawatts) as requested by the Canadian Pacific.

The locomotive was later assigned with a classification by the Canadian Pacific Railway as a CP class DRF-36d and was assigned to operate on coal trains between the Crowsnest area and Vancouver, British Columbia, however, in the late 1970s, the locomotive was transferred to Eastern Canada.

In 1984, the locomotive was used as a technological test bench where the six-axle trucks were reconfigured as A1A-A1A, meaning that the central axle was no longer motorized, and four alternating current traction motors were installed on the outer axles.

=== Retirement and preservation ===
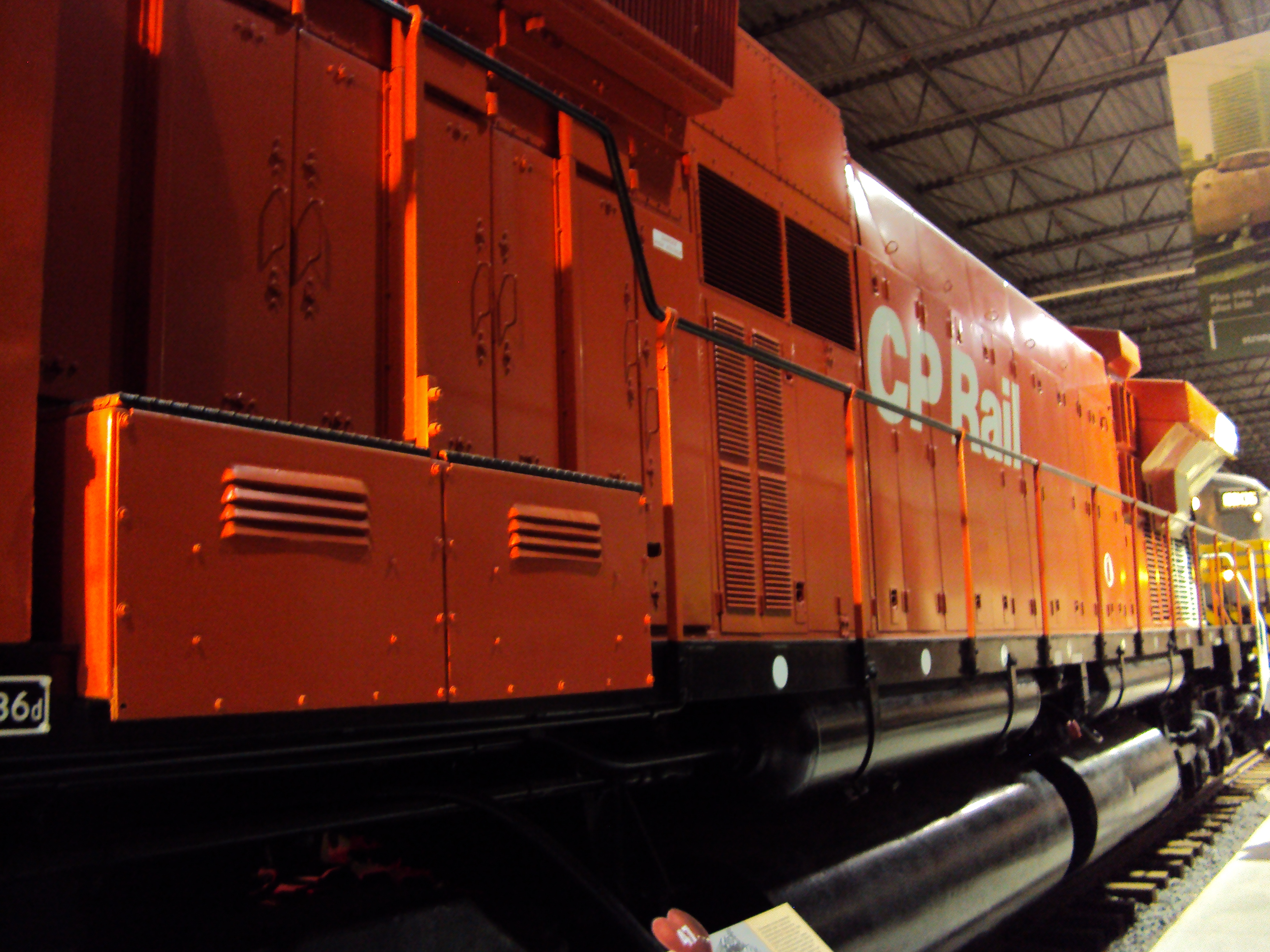
CP #4744 on display at the Canadian Railway Museum

In 1992, while operating on a train run between Montreal and Binghamton, the locomotive had suffered an irremediable mechanical failure when its crankshaft had broken, and no replacement part was available to replace it.

After spending a few years on the disused site of the Canadian Pacific's Angus Shops, following its retirement, it was acquired by the Canadian Railway Museum in 1998 and was placed on static display at the museum that same year.

== Bibliography ==
- Daniels, Rudolph (2000). Trains Across the Continent: North American Railroad History. Indiana University Press. ISBN 9780253214119.
