= FM H-24-66 =

American diesel-electric locomotives

FM H-24-66 Train Master
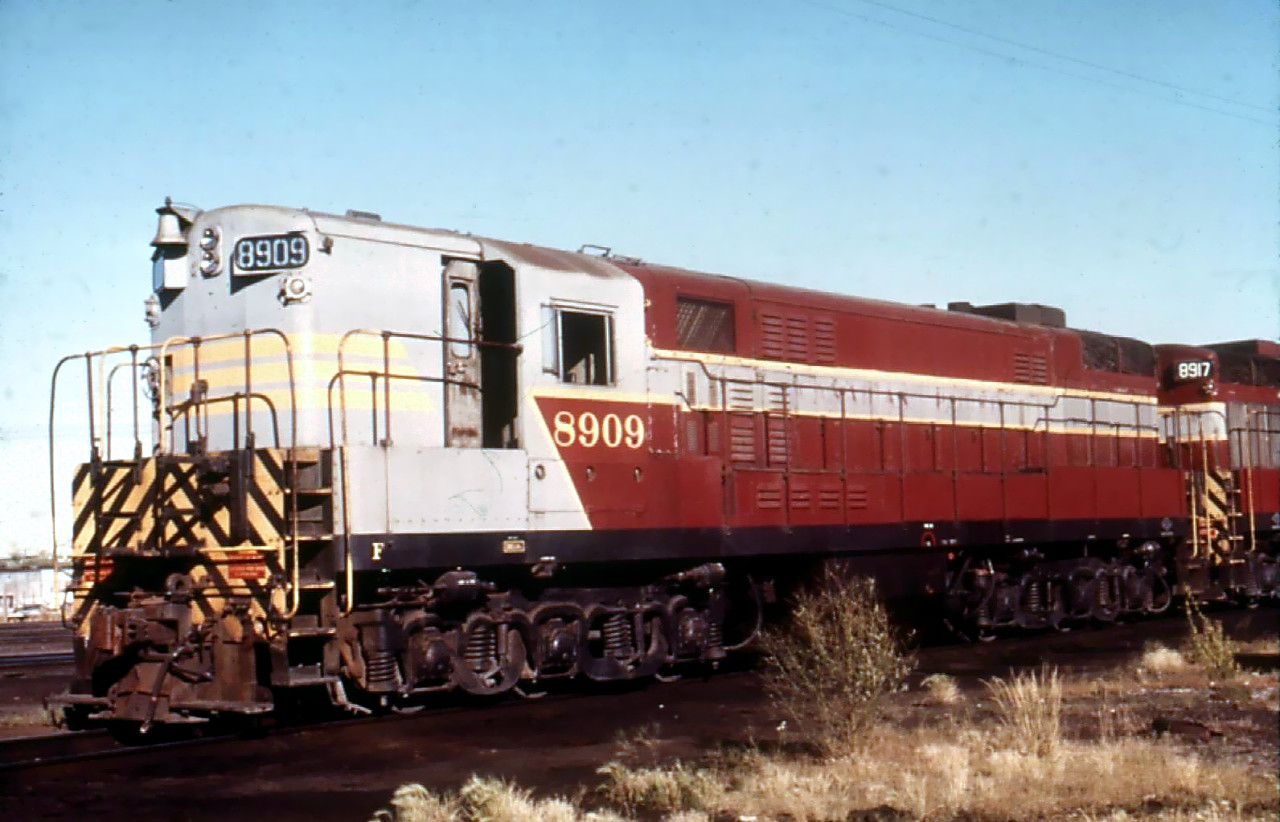
- Canadian Pacific Railway #8909, a CLC H-24-66 or "Train Master."
Type and origin
- Power type: Diesel-electric
- Builder: Fairbanks-Morse
- Build date: April 1953–June 1957
- Total produced: 127
Specifications
- Configuration
  - AAR: C-C
  - UIC: Co'Co'
- Gauge: 4 ft 8 1/2 in (1,435 mm)
- Trucks: Baldwin-style Commonwealth
- Length: 66 ft 0 in (20.12 m)
- Loco weight: 375,000 lb (170,000 kg; 170 t)
- Prime mover: FM 38D-8 1/8
- Engine type: 12-cylinders, opposed-piston two-stroke diesel
- Aspiration: Roots blower
- Displacement: 12,443 cu in (203.90 L)
- Generator: DC
- Traction motors: 6x WE 370DE2 DC traction motors (standard); 6x GE 752 DC traction motors
- Cylinders: 12
- Cylinder size: 8.125 in × 10 in (206 mm × 254 mm)
- Transmission: Diesel-electric
- Loco brake: 24RL air, Dynamic
- Train brakes: Air
Performance figures
- Maximum speed: 65 mph (105 km/h) / 80 mph (130 km/h)
- Power output: 2,400 hp (1.79 MW)
- Tractive effort: 112,000 lbf (498.2 kN)
Career
- Locale: North America

The H-24-66, or Train Master, is a diesel-electric railroad locomotive produced by Fairbanks-Morse and its licensee, Canadian Locomotive Company. These six-axle hood unit road switchers were used in the United States and Canada during the 1950s.

They were the successor to the unsuccessful Consolidated line of cab units produced by F-M and CLC in the 1950s. Each locomotive produced 2,400 horsepower (1.8 MW). Like other F-M locomotives, the Train Master used an opposed-piston prime mover. It rode on a pair of drop-equalized three-axle "Trimount" trucks, giving it a C-C wheel arrangement.

== Overview ==
Advertised by Fairbanks-Morse as "the most useful locomotive ever built", the 2,400-horsepower (1.8 MW) H-24-66 Train Master was the most powerful single-engine diesel locomotive at its introduction in 1953. No competitor offered a locomotive with an equal horsepower rating until the ALCO RSD-7 entered production in January 1954. EMD followed suit in July 1958 with the SD24, and GE introduced their U25C in September 1963.

While some railroads saw advantages in the Train Master's greater power, others thought the unit had too much horsepower. Other drawbacks were the difficulties inherent in maintaining the opposed-piston engine, inadequacies in the electrical system, and a higher-than-normal consumption of cooling water. All these contributed to poor market acceptance of the Train Masters—and ultimately the departure of F-M and CLC from the locomotive business.

== Variations ==
Three carbody variants were produced. Phase 1a units had air-intake louvers in a continuous line along the top of the long hood and a wide separating strip between the radiator fans. Phase 1b had a "dip" in the long hood handrails to better follow the side walkways. Phase 2 units had fewer air-intake louvers, with large gaps separating them, and the radiators themselves were divided by a tiny metal strip.

=== Units manufactured by Fairbanks-Morse (1953–1957) ===
Image	Railroad	Quantity	Road numbers	Notes
	Fairbanks-Morse (demonstrator units)	4	TM-1 – TM-4	TM-1 & TM-2 to Wabash Railroad 550–551; TM-3 & TM-4 to Southern Pacific 4800–4801/3020–3021
	Canadian National Railway	1	3000	Later renumbered 2900.
	Canadian Pacific Railway	1	8900	Only CPR Train Master built by FM (not CLC). Delivered with a single steam generator. Remaining (twenty) CPR Train Masters (8901-8920) built by CLC (see below).
	Central Railroad of New Jersey	13	2401–2413	
	Delaware, Lackawanna and Western Railroad	12	850–861	to Erie Lackawanna Railroad 1850–1861
	Pennsylvania Railroad	9	8699–8707	to Penn Central 6700–6708
	Reading Company	17	800–808, 860–867	
	Southern Pacific	14	4802–4815, 4800-4815	Renumbered 3020–3035 in 1965
	Southern Railway (CNO&TP)	5	6300–6304	
	Virginian Railway	25	50–74	to Norfolk and Western Railway 150–174
	Wabash Railroad	6	552–554, 552A–554A	Renumbered 552–557
	Total	107		

=== Units manufactured by the Canadian Locomotive Company (1956) ===
Image	Railroad	Quantity	Road numbers	Notes
	Canadian Pacific Railway	20	8901–8920	CP 8905 is the only H-24-66 preserved. It can be seen at the Canadian Railway Museum in Saint-Constant, Quebec, Canada. 8901-8904 originally delivered with unique wide short hoods housing dual steam generators, converted to normal hood width when SG's removed.

== Preservation ==
Only one Train Master locomotive has survived intact: former Canadian Pacific Railway (CPR) H-24-66 #8905 is preserved on static display at the Canadian Railway Museum in Saint-Constant, Quebec.

Some former Virginian Railway Train Masters were rebuilt into slugs by the Norfolk and Western Railway; they survived well into Norfolk Southern service. One is preserved at the Reading Railroad Heritage Museum in Hamburg, Pennsylvania.
