= FM Consolidation Line =

Series of American locomotive models

C-liner
- A builder's photo of F-M model CPA-24-5 demonstrator units #4802 (foreground) and #4801. The B-A1A configured units were eventually purchased by the New York, New Haven and Hartford Railroad and assigned road #0790 & #0791.
Type and origin
- Power type: Diesel-electric
- Builder: Fairbanks Morse (USA), Canadian Locomotive Company
- Build date: September 1950-February 1952 (CFA/B-16-4) March–July 1950 (CFA/B-20-4) June–August 1950 (CPA-20-5) April 1951-March 1952 (CPA-24-5) May 1951-May 1954 (CPA/B-16-4) December 1954-February 1955 (CPA/B-16-5)
- Total produced: 99 (USA), 66 (Canada)
Specifications
- Configuration
  - AAR: B-B or B-A1A
- Gauge: 4 ft 8 1/2 in (1,435 mm) standard gauge
- Length: 56 ft 3 in (17.15 m)
- Prime mover: 38D-8-1/8
- Engine type: Two-stroke opposed piston diesel
- Generator: Westinghouse 497B (1600 hp models) Westinghouse 498A (2000 and 2400 hp models)
- Traction motors: Westinghouse 370DE (4)
- Cylinders: 8, 10, or 12
- Cylinder size: 8.125 by 10 inches (206 mm × 254 mm)
Performance figures
- Power output: 1,600 hp (1.19 MW), 2,000 hp (1.49 MW), or 2,400 hp (1,800 kW)
Career
- Disposition: Two A units built by The Canadian Locomotive Company are preserved, remainder scrapped.

The Consolidation Line was a series of diesel-electric railway locomotive designs produced by Fairbanks-Morse and its Canadian licensee, the Canadian Locomotive Company. Railfans have dubbed these locomotives C-liners, but F-M referred to the models collectively as the C-Line. A combined total of 165 units (123 cab-equipped lead A units and 42 cabless booster B units) were produced by F-M and the CLC between 1950 and 1955.

== Genesis of the C-liner ==
Since 1932, Fairbanks-Morse had specialized in the manufacture of opposed piston diesel engines for United States Naval vessels. Not long after, the company produced a 300 hp (220 kW) 5 by 6 inches (127 mm × 152 mm) engine that saw limited use in railcar applications on the B&O, Milwaukee Road, and a few other lines. Additionally, two of the 5 × 6s were placed in an experimental center cab switcher locomotive under development by the Reading Railroad (road #87, built in 1939 by the St. Louis Car Company, or SLCC, and scrapped in 1953). A 5 x 6 powered the plant switcher at F-M's Beloit, Wisconsin manufacturing facility.

In 1939, the SLCC placed F-M 800 hp (600 kW) 8 by 10 inches (203 mm × 254 mm) engines in six streamlined railcars, which became known as the FM OP800. In 1944, F-M began production of its own 1,000-horsepower (0.75 MW) yard switcher, the H-10-44. Milwaukee Road #760 (originally delivered as #1802), the first Fairbanks-Morse locomotive constructed in their own plant, is preserved and on display at the Illinois Railway Museum. F-M had yet to produce a railroad road locomotive, or any locomotive prior to the 1944 switcher which was built several years after its conception; all other locomotive producers, except for General Motors (and a few others who manufactured small industrial locomotives), were forced by the government to continue to build reciprocating steam locomotives during much of the war. All national locomotive production was subject to strict wartime restrictions regarding the number and type of railroad-related products they could manufacture (the U.S. Government in the name of the Navy commandeered all F-M O-P production well into 1944). Following World War II, North American railways began phasing out their aging steam locomotives and sought to replace them with state-of-the-art diesel locomotives at an ever-increasing rate due to the unfavorable economics of steam propulsion. Fairbanks-Morse, along with its competing firms, sought to capitalize on this new market opportunity.

In December 1945 F-M produced its first streamlined, cab/carbody dual service diesel locomotive as direct competition to such models as the ALCO FA and PA and EMD FT and E-unit. Assembly of the 2,000 horsepower (1.49 MW) unit, which was mounted on an A1A-A1A wheelset, was subcontracted out to General Electric due to lack of space at F-M's Wisconsin plant. GE built the locomotives at its Erie, Pennsylvania facility, thereby giving rise to the name “Erie-built”. F-M retained the services of renowned industrial designer Raymond Loewy to create a visually impressive carbody for the Erie-built. The line was only moderately successful, as a total of 82 cab and 28 booster units was sold through 1949, when production was ended. The Erie-Built program faced several problems, including a nine-month strike in Beloit near the start of production, the cost of outsourcing much of the Erie-Built's design and production to GE, and several high-cost components including two types of unique truck and secondary electrical and cooling systems.

F-M wanted to produce a carbody successor to the Erie-Built which could be manufactured in-house, and this required a new ground-up design and expansion of the locomotive shop at Beloit. Because of the design parameters laid down for the new locomotives, only the O-P engine, the traction motors, and a few accessories could be carried over from F-M's hood locomotives. The resulting Consolidation Line (known in-house as the C-Line) debuted in January 1950.

C-liners took many of their design cues from the Erie-builts, using a carbody that was 56 ft 3 in (17.15 m) long. This was 8 ft (2.4 m) shorter than the Erie-Built, yet had room for a 12-cylinder OP engine (as opposed to the Erie-built's 10-cylinder engine) and a 4,500-lb-per-hour steam generator. The C-Line was offered with 8-cylinder 1,600 hp (1.19 MW), 10-cylinder 2,000 hp (1.49 MW), and 12-cylinder 2,400 hp (1,800 kW) versions of F-M's 38D8-1/8 opposed-piston diesel prime movers. New two-axle trucks with a distinctive curved equalizing bar were developed, which became standard in other F-M locomotives.

== C-line models ==
The model designation followed the format of C (for Consolidation), F or P (Passenger or Freight), A or B (cab or cabless), two digits for horsepower, and one digit for the number of axles, so that CPA-24-5 was a 5-axle 2,400-hp passenger unit with a cab while CFB-16-4 would be a 4-axle, 1600-hp freight booster. Four-axle units used a B-B wheel arrangement, while a B-A1A wheel arrangement (three-axle rear truck with a center idler axle) was used on passenger units where the weight of the steam generator and feedwater tanks would cause the axle load to exceed 66,000 lb.

The C-Line was intended to consist of seven models, with A and B (cab and cabless) versions of each: Four-axle freight units with 1600, 2000 or 2400 horsepower, four-axle passenger with the 1600-hp engine, and five-axle passenger units with all three engines. However, several proposed models, including the CFA-24-4, CFB-24-4, CPB-20-5 and CPB-24-5 received no orders, and 1600-hp passenger units (in both 4- and 5-axle configurations) were only built by CLC.

CPx-16-4 models had steam generators of 1,600 to 2,800 lb/hr capacity and feedwater tanks of 1,000 to 1,050 gallons, while five-axle passenger models had steam generators rated at 1,600 to 4,500 lb/hr and feedwater capacity of 1,600 to 1,800 gallons, which could be increased to 1,850 gallons on CPx-24-5 models. Most C-liners were fitted out with main electrical generators manufactured by Westinghouse Electric. C-Liners were also built by CLC in Kingston, Ontario, and the last C-liners built by CLC for Canadian National Railways (CPA-16-5 #6700–6705 and CPB-16-5 #6800–6805) had General Electric equipment and lacked dynamic brakes.

== Failure in the marketplace ==
Orders for the C-liners were initially received from the New York Central, followed by the Long Island Rail Road, the Pennsylvania Railroad, the Milwaukee Road and the New Haven. Orders to the Canadian Locomotive Company were also forthcoming in Canada from the Canadian Pacific and Canadian National railways. However, accounts of mechanical unreliability and poor technical support soon began to emerge. The Westinghouse generators in the 2,400 hp (1,800 kW) C-Line locomotives were prone to flashing over when wheelslip occurred at high speeds (such as on wet rails), and the OP prime movers initially suffered from relatively poor piston life and proved difficult to maintain. Engine reliability and maintenance problems led New York Central to repower all of its 2,000 and 2,400 hp C-Line locomotives (as well as several of its Erie-Builts) with EMD 567 engines in 1955-56, when the locomotives were between 3 and 6 years old. Moreover, railroads were quickly moving away from cab unit designs, and standardizing on road switcher locomotive designs, as offered by the competition in the form of the EMD GP7 or the Alco RS-3 and even the Baldwin DRS-4-4-1500.

Robert Aldag Jr., who would eventually head up F-M's locomotive division, acknowledged that while the C-Line eliminated the high production costs of the Erie-Built, it failed in the marketplace due to its late entry, which he estimated was five years too late to take advantage of the sales boom due to dieselization in the US.

By 1952, orders had dried up in the United States, with a total production run of only 99 units. The units proved relatively more popular in Canada, particularly with the CPR, and orders continued there until 1955. Several variants were only ever produced by the Canadian Locomotive Company, and Canadian roads accepted a total of 66 units. However, Westinghouse had announced in 1953 that it was leaving the locomotive equipment market, in part because of the generator reliability issues in the F-M units. This development made continuing production of the C-liners impractical without a redesign, and since marketplace acceptance was already marginal, the decision was made to end production.

With the Train Master series, F-M continued production of their own road-switcher designs, but these also ultimately proved unsuccessful in the marketplace and Fairbanks-Morse departed the locomotive market.

== Models ==
Louis Marx and Company produced a mid-1950s tinplate line of Fairbanks Morse styled 0 gauge engines. The Monon #81 came first, in 1955–59; the Seaboard #4000 came in 1955–1962 came; and the classic Kansas City Southern #54 came in 1955–60. Tin lithographed production continued into the early 1960s.

Life-Like (and later Walthers) produced plastic A- and B-unit models of the four-axle freight C-Line locomotives in HO scale (Proto 1000 series) and N scale (Proto series). Because the C-Line units had identical car bodies, these models are correct for CFA-16-4, CFB-16-4, CFA-20-4 and CFB-20-4 locomotives. They are no longer in production.

Tru-Line Trains made 4- and 5-axle C-Liners in HO and N scale. The site announced that they were returning to production, but no date was given. On August 24, 2020, Atlas announced that they had acquired some Tru-Line Trains molds including the HO scale C-Line model.

Atlas Model Railroad made plastic models of the five-axle passenger C-Liner between 1967 and approximately 1969.

Rivarossi produced plastic four-axle C-Liner A- and B-units between 1954 and 1982. This model was later sold under the AHM brand.

Lionel announced 0 gauge versions of the CPA units (ex. MTH Tooling) in their 2021 Volume 2 catalog. Dealer Trainworld announced custom versions for the Long Island Rail Road, clad in other LI liveries than offered in the catalog.

== Units produced by Fairbanks-Morse (1950–1953) ==
=== Freight units ===
==== CFA-16-4 (cabs) and CFB-16-4 (cabless boosters) ====
Image	Railroad	Quantity A units	Quantity B units	Road numbers A units	Road numbers B units	Notes
	Chicago, Milwaukee, St. Paul and Pacific Railroad (“Milwaukee Road”)	12	6	23A,C–28A,C	23B–28B	
	New York Central Railroad	8	4	6600–6607	6900–6903	Delivered 2-3/1952, retired 9/1966
	Pennsylvania Railroad	16	8	9448A–9455A, 9492A–9499A	9448B–9454B, 9492B&9498B (all even nos. only)	
	Totals	36	18			

==== CFA-20-4 (cabs) and CFB-20-4 (cabless boosters) ====
Image	Railroad	Quantity A units	Quantity B units	Road numbers A units	Road numbers B units	Notes
	New York Central Railroad	12	3	5006–5017	5102–5104	5006, 5010, 5013, 5014 re-engined with 1,500 hp (1.12 MW) EMD 567C engines in 1955, remainder re-engined with 1,750 hp (1.30 MW) EMD 567C engines in 1956. All later scrapped.

=== Passenger units ===
==== CPA-20-5 (cabs) ====
Image	Railroad	Quantity	Road numbers	Notes
	Long Island Rail Road	8	2001–2008	

==== CPA-24-5 (cabs) ====
Image	Railroad	Quantity	Road numbers	Notes
	Fairbanks-Morse (demonstrator units)	2	4801–4802	to New York, New Haven and Hartford Railroad 790–791
	Long Island Rail Road	4	2401–2404	
	New York, New Haven and Hartford Railroad	8	792–799	
	New York Central Railroad	8	4500–4507	Re-engined with EMD 16-567C engines 1955-56, all retired 10/66 and sold for scrap 1/67
	Total	22		

== Units produced by the Canadian Locomotive Company (1950–1954) ==
=== Freight units ===
==== CFA-16-4 (cabs) and CFB-16-4 (cabless boosters) ====
Image	Railroad	Quantity A units	Quantity B units	Road numbers A units	Road numbers B units	Notes
	Canadian National Railways	23	3	8700–8744 (even numbers only)	8701–8705 (odd numbers only)	
	Canadian Pacific Railway	6	4	4076–4081	4455–4458	
	Totals	29	7			

=== Passenger units ===
==== CPA-16-4 (cabs) and CPB-16-4 (cabless boosters) ====
Image	Railroad	Quantity A units	Quantity B units	Road numbers A units	Road numbers B units	Notes
	Fairbanks-Morse (demonstrator units)	2	—	7005–7006	—	to Canadian Pacific 4064–4065
	Canadian Pacific Railway	8	8	4052–4057, 4104–4105	4449–4454, 4471–4472	
	Totals	10	8			

==== CPA-16-5 (cabs) and CPB-16-5 (cabless boosters) ====
Image	Railroad	Quantity A units	Quantity B units	Road numbers A units	Road numbers B units	Notes
	Canadian National Railways	6	6	6700–6705	6800–6805	

== Preservation ==
Though none of the C Liners built by Fairbanks-Morse escaped the cutter's torch, 2 A units built by The Canadian Locomotive Company for the Canadian Pacific Railway are preserved. A unit 4104 is preserved on outdoor display in Nelson, British Columbia, and A unit 4065 is awaiting restoration at the Canadian museum of Science and technology in Ottawa. B units 4455 and 4456 (converted to BC Rail radio control receiver cars) were under private ownership in Calgary, Alberta but have since been scrapped in December 2023.
