= Canadian Locomotive Company =

Canadian railway locomotive manufacturer

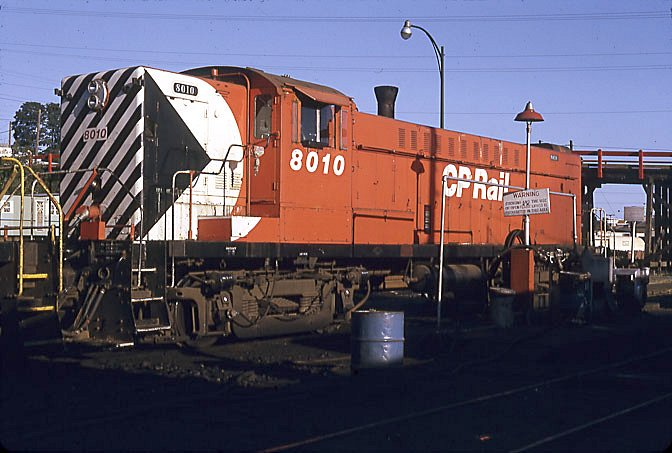
- A Canadian Locomotive Company Baldwin DRS-4-4-1000 in Canadian Pacific Railway livery.
- Industry: rail transport
- Predecessors: Ontario Foundry; Kingston Locomotive Works; Canadian Engine & Machinery Company; Canadian Locomotive and Engine Company Ltd.
- Founded: February 1878
- Defunct: April 1969
- Fate: dissolved
- Headquarters: Kingston, Ontario, Canada
- Area served: North America
- Products: locomotives

The Canadian Locomotive Company, commonly referred to as CLC, was a Canadian manufacturer of railway locomotives in Kingston, Ontario. Its works were on the south side of Ontario Street between William and Gore streets on Kingston's waterfront.

== Early beginnings and bankruptcies ==
The CLC had its beginnings with a number of predecessor businesses. It began business as the Ontario Foundry in 1848, but after commencing construction of locomotives it became known as the Kingston Locomotive Works. The first steam locomotive was turned out on Wednesday, December 20, 1854. This was the first of four locomotives for the Grand Trunk Railway of Canada, which was being built at that time. A further order of five locomotives for the GTR followed in October and November 1856. However, less than three dozen locomotives were built before the business went bankrupt in 1860.

The Canadian Engine & Machinery Company was a shareholder-owned successor company founded in 1865. It too ran into financial troubles during the depression of 1878–1879 and also went bankrupt. It was re-organized in February 1878 as the Canadian Locomotive and Engine Company Ltd. (CL&EC). After yet another re-organization in April 1881, the plant was updated and expanded. The syndicate of investors who owned the Canadian Pacific Railway also owned a large portion of the CL&EC, and when funds were needed to further work on the CPR, their shares were sold to the respected locomotive builder Dübs and Company, of Glasgow, Scotland, which eventually gained control effective January 1, 1888. CL&EC became a major supplier to the CPR, delivering nearly one-third of their locomotives over many decades. These "Dübs-boilered" locomotives were regarded as durable and long-lasting.

== CLC is formed and finds modest success ==
In January 1900, following the decision of both the CPR and the GTR to build their own locomotives, the CL&EC once again became insolvent, and the plant was closed. It was bought by new investors and incorporated in February 1901 as the Canadian Locomotive Company Ltd. Improvements followed which allowed production of one locomotive per week. Reorganization once again took place under new management in June 1911 although the name remained the same.

CLC contributed to the war effort in two world wars by manufacturing armaments and munitions, as did the competing shops of the Montreal Locomotive Works, the CPR, and others. Large numbers of locomotives were also built for the war effort and for reconstruction afterwards.

By the end of World War II steam technology was at its peak, but production was declining except for exports to France, Belgium and India. One of the last groups of steam locomotives, completed in 1955, was 120 1,676 mm (5 ft 6 in) broad gauge, streamlined 4-6-2 types for passenger service in India. CLC felt its future lay with diesel locomotives, but lacking expertise it sought out opportunities with existing builders in the United States.

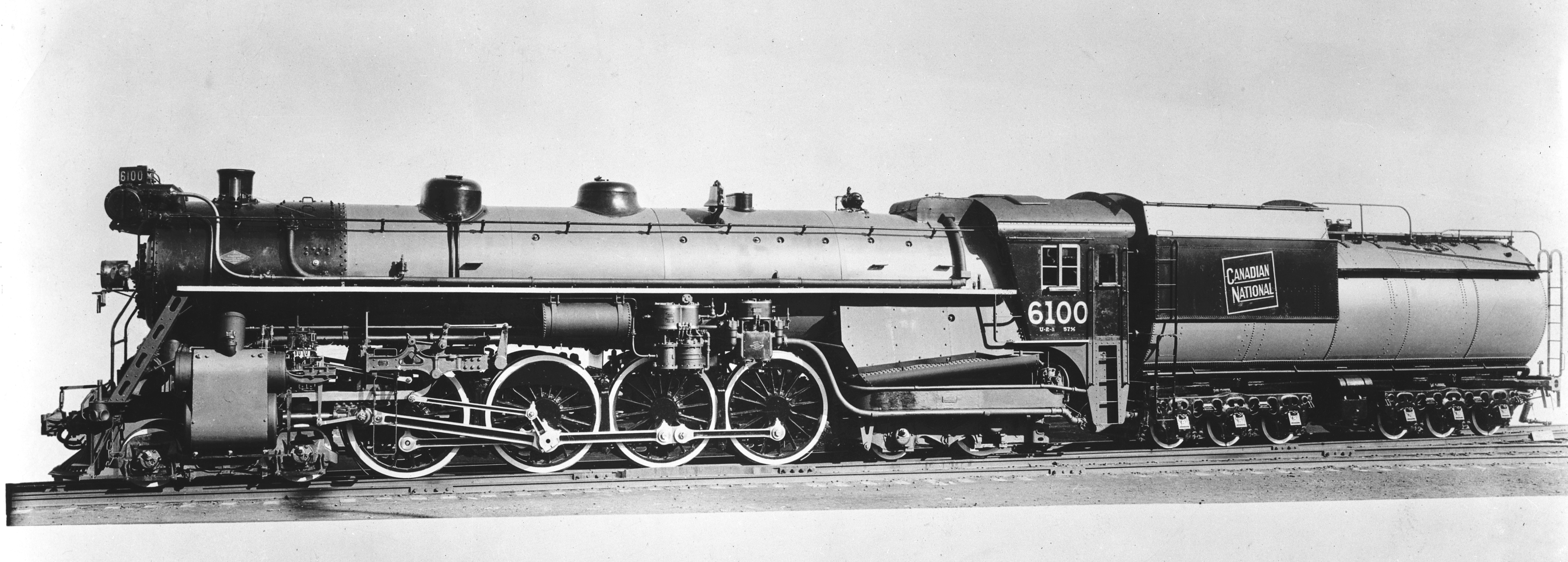
CLC built the first 4-8-4 locomotive for Canadian National Railways in 1927.

== Representing American manufacturers ==
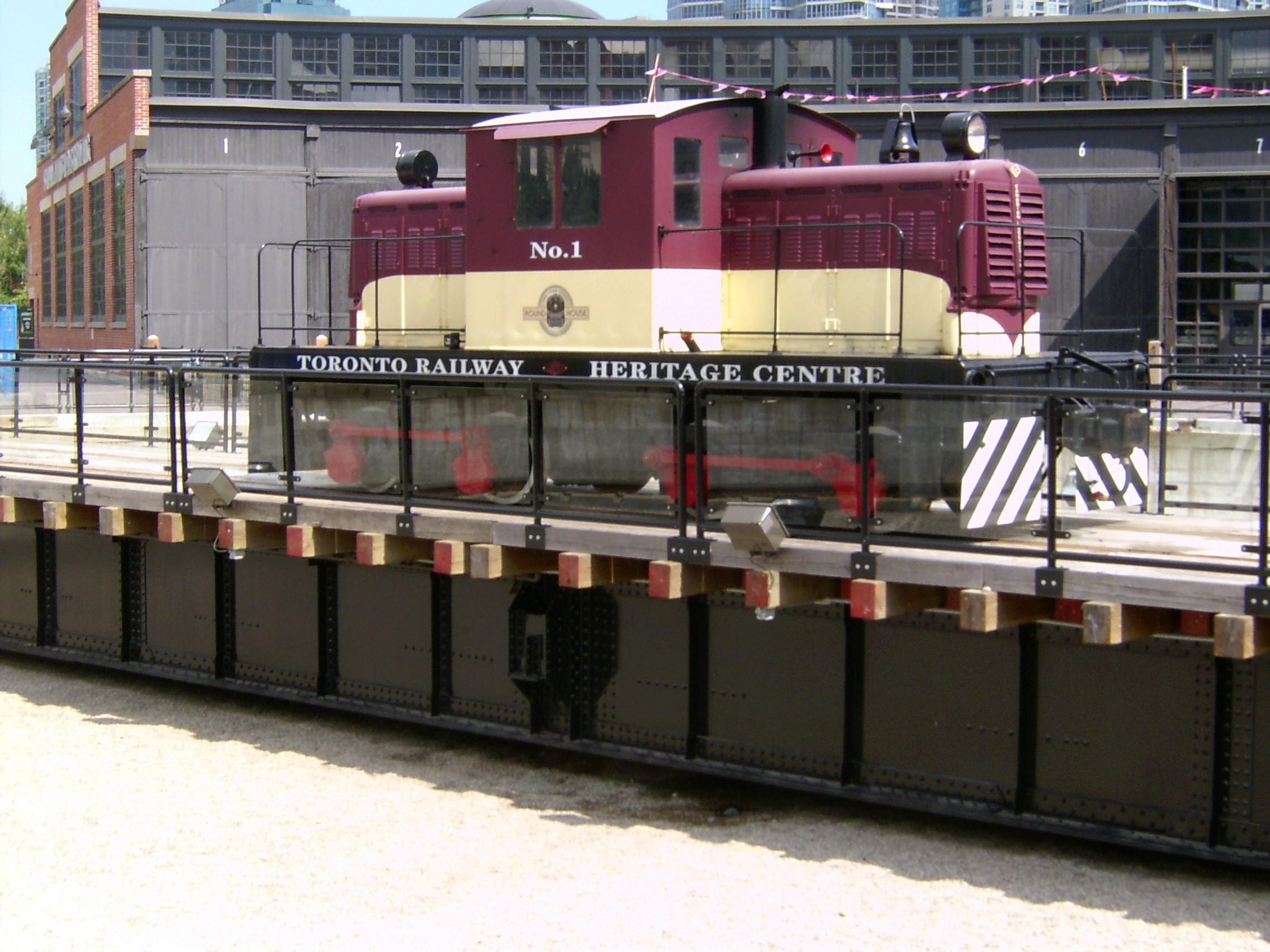
50-ton Whitcomb switcher manufactured by the Canadian Locomotive Company in 1950, now used at the Toronto Railway Museum

In 1948 CLC became the Canadian representative for Baldwin Locomotive Works which also owned Whitcomb Locomotive Works. However, the result of this collaboration was less than outstanding — the Whitcomb locomotives built for the Canadian National Railway with Sterling diesel engines proved problematic, and orders for Baldwin-designed locomotives were modest. CLC then turned to Fairbanks-Morse, a manufacturer of opposed piston diesel engines primarily used in maritime applications that was itself attempting to break into the railway locomotive market. Baldwin's shares in CLC were acquired in 1950 by the newly formed Canadian Fairbanks Morse. Orders were more extensive and longer-lasting, especially for the Train Master and Consolidated line designs. However, the Fairbanks-Morse designs proved to be no match in the marketplace for the ALCO-designed locomotives offered by the Montreal Locomotive Works or to the Electro-Motive Division-designs constructed by General Motors Diesel. By 1957, orders had fallen off and Fairbanks-Morse eventually left the locomotive business in both Canada and the United States. Following the departure of Baldwin and MLW, the Canadian market was left to just two companies, General Electric and General Motors Diesel.

Before this however, CLC also sought more opportunities in the export market with the involvement of government agencies, exporting small industrial locomotives of Davenport-Besler design. In 1955 CLC bought the Davenport-Besler Corp. Inc., including its inventory of Porter locomotives. A Canadian-only DTC (Diesel Torque Converter) was built for the CPR featuring a diesel-hydraulic design rather than the conventional diesel-electric.

On July 26, 1965, CLC became Fairbanks-Morse (Canada) Ltd. and was no longer an independent Canadian company. Locomotive construction dwindled even further as the company branched out into industrial machinery such as marine engines and weigh scales. None of this could save the company.

== End of CLC ==
Declining business and a union strike in April 1969 closed the plant that June. It was demolished in August 1971 after having constructed over 3000 locomotives from its earliest beginnings, making it at the time, Canada's second largest commercial builder after Montreal Locomotive Works.

The site of the old plant (known as "Block D") sat vacant for 35 years while several proposed developments failed to materialize or obtain municipal approval. It would be the last vacated portion of Ontario Street's formerly industrial waterfront to be developed. After work to negate the effects of a century of industrial pollutants in the soil, it has recently been redeveloped with three high-rise apartment/condominium buildings (Locomotive Apartments, Carruthers Wharf, and Royal George), a high-rise hotel (Marriott Residences Inn), and a small municipal park (Battery Park).

== Clients ==
- Canadian Pacific Railway
- Canadian National Railway
