= List of Fairbanks-Morse locomotives =

Fairbanks-Morse, is a historic American (and Canadian) industrial scale manufacturer. It later diversified into pumps, engines and industrial supplies. One arm of the company is now a Diesel engine manufacturer located in Beloit, Wisconsin and has specialized in the manufacture of opposed-piston Diesel engines for United States Navy vessels and railroad locomotives since 1932. The diesel railroad locomotives the company produced are as follows:

== Cab units ==
Model	Build year	Total produced	Wheel arrangement	Prime mover	Power output	Image
FM Erie-built	1945–1949	82 A units 29 B units	A1A-A1A	FM 38D-10 opposed-piston	2,000 hp (1.49 MW)	
FM OP800	1939	6	2-A1A	FM 38F-5 opposed-piston	800 hp (0.60 MW)	Retired Georgia Northern Railway #2, a Fairbanks-Morse Model OP800 railcar.
FM P-12-42	1957–1958	4	B-2	FM 38D-8 opposed-piston	1,200 hp (0.89 MW)	An FM P-12-42, Boston and Maine Railroad #1

=== C-liners ===
Model	Build year	Total produced	Wheel arrangement	Prime mover	Power output	Image
FM CFA-16-4	1950–1953	36	B-B	FM 38D-8 opposed-piston	1,600 hp (1.19 MW)	
FM CFB-16-4	1950–1953	18	B-B	FM 38D-8 opposed-piston	1,600 hp (1.19 MW)	
FM CFA-20-4	1950–1953	12	B-B	FM 38D-10 opposed-piston	2,000 hp (1.49 MW)	
FM CFB-20-4	1950–1953	3	B-B	FM 38D-10 opposed-piston	2,000 hp (1.49 MW)	
FM CPA-20-5	1950–1953	8	B-A1A	FM 38D-10 opposed-piston	2,000 hp (1.49 MW)	
FM CPA-24-5	1950–1953	22	B-A1A	FM 38D-12 opposed-piston	2,400 hp (1.79 MW)	

The following C-liners were only produced by F-M's Canadian licensee, the Canadian Locomotive Company:
Model	Build year	Total produced	Wheel arrangement	Prime mover	Power output	Image
CLC CPA-16-4	1950–1954	39	B-B	FM 38D-8 opposed-piston	1,600 hp (1.19 MW)	
CLC CFB-16-4	1950–1954	15	B-B	FM 38D-8 opposed-piston	1,600 hp (1.19 MW)	
CLC CPA-16-5	1950–1954	6	B-A1A	FM 38D-8 opposed-piston	1,600 hp (1.19 MW)	
CLC CFB-16-5	1950–1954	6	B-A1A	FM 38D-8 opposed-piston	1,600 hp (1.19 MW)	

== Switchers ==
Model	Build year	Total produced	Wheel arrangement	Prime mover	Power output	Image
FM H-10-44	1944–1950	195	B-B	FM 38D-6 opposed-piston	1,000 hp (0.75 MW)	
FM H-12-44	1950–1961	336	B-B	FM 38D-6 opposed-piston	1,200 hp (0.89 MW)	
FM H-12-44TS	1956	3	B-B	FM 38D-6 opposed-piston	1,200 hp (0.89 MW)	

The following switchers were only produced by F-M's Canadian licensee, the Canadian Locomotive Company.
Model	Build year	Total produced	Wheel arrangement	Prime mover	Power output	Image
FM H-12-46	1951–1953	30	A1A-A1A	FM 38D-6 opposed-piston	1,200 hp (0.89 MW)	

== Road Switchers ==
Model	Build year	Total produced	Wheel arrangement	Prime mover	Power output	Image
FM H-15-44	1947–1950	35	B-B	FM 38D-8 opposed-piston	1,500 hp (1.12 MW)	
FM H-16-44	1950–1963	299	B-B	FM 38D-8 opposed-piston	1,600 hp (1.19 MW)	
FM H-20-44	1947–1954	96	B-B	FM 38D-10 opposed-piston	2,000 hp (1.49 MW)	
FM H-16-66 (Baby Train Master)	1951–1958	59	C-C	FM 38D-8 opposed-piston	1,600 hp (1.19 MW)	
FM H-24-66 (Train Master)	1951–1958	127	C-C	FM 38D-12 opposed-piston	2,400 hp (1.79 MW)	

== See also ==
- Opposed-piston engine
