= Cold spot =

Cold spot may refer to:

- Cold spot (astronomy), an area of low temperature around young impact craters on the Moon
- Cold spot (paranormal), an area of low temperature that allegedly indicates the presence of a ghost
- CMB cold spot, a vast area of space that is unusually cold in the microwave spectrum
- Coldspot, a former Sears brand of refrigerators and other cooling units
- Ice volcano, or more specifically a type of ice volcano that is analogous to a geological hotspot.
