= Robert E. Bourke Jr. =

Automotive and industrial designer

Robert E. "Bob" Bourke Jr.
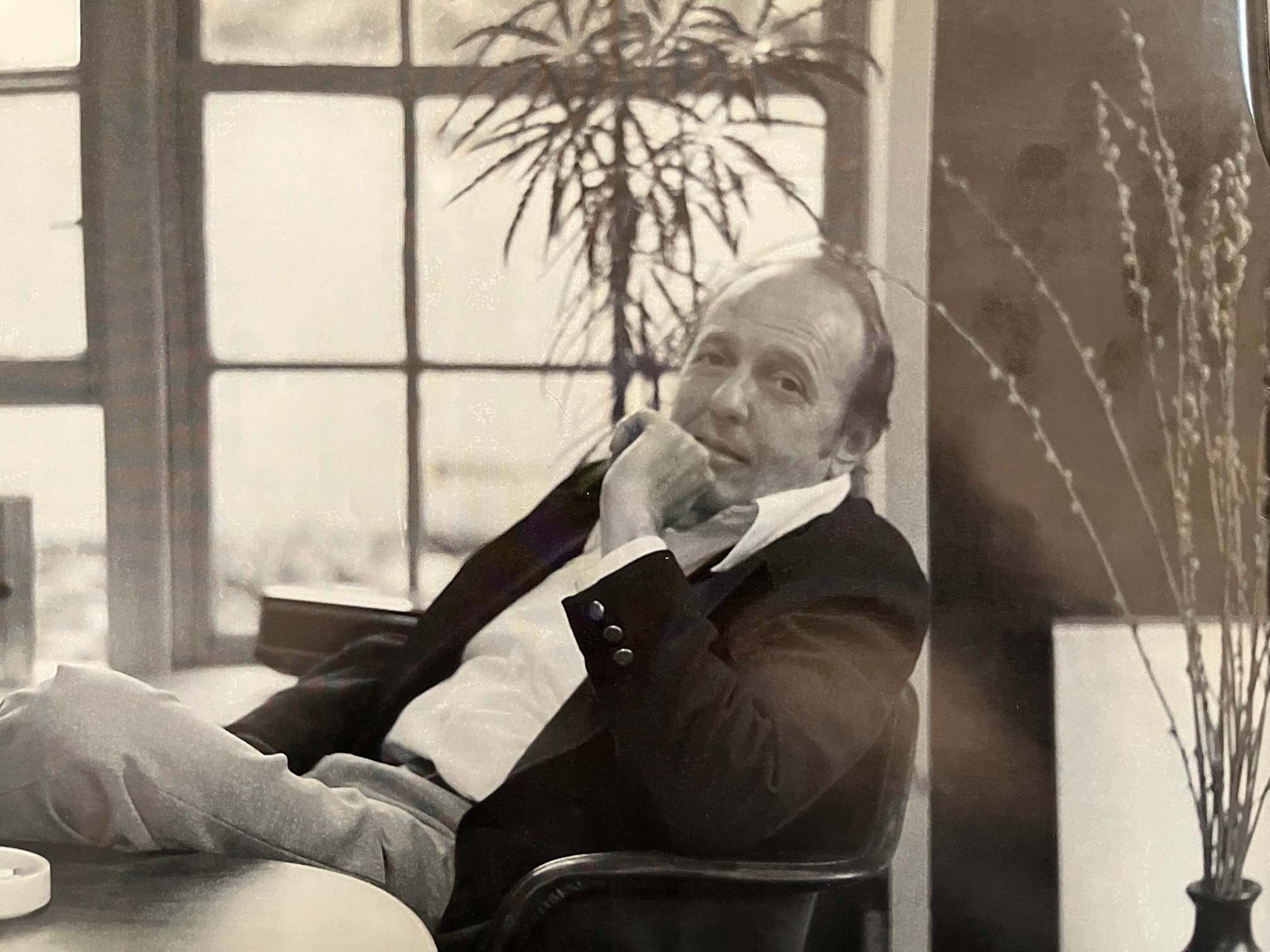
- Bourke in 1972
- Born: June 15, 1916; Chicago, Illinois, US
- Died: December 1, 1996 (aged 80); Scottsdale, Arizona, US
- Resting place: Calvary Cemetery, Chicago, IL
- Occupations: Automotive and industrial designer Years active 1937-1986
- Spouse(s): Pearl Mildred Gualano (m, 1942; died 2008)
- Children: 2

Robert E. "Bob" Bourke Jr. (June 15, 1916 – December 1, 1996) was an automotive and industrial designer. He was best known for his design of the 1953-1954 Studebaker Starlight and Starliner coupes, while he was the Manager and Chief Designer of Raymond Loewy and Associates South Bend, Indiana office, which had the Studebaker account. This automobile won dozens of design prizes. It was featured on the cover of Time magazine in 1953 and exhibited at the Museum of Modern Art, which later called it "a work of art". The Fashion Academy of New York awarded it its gold medal. In 1987 the Society of Automotive Engineers recognized Bourke as one of the five most influential automobile designers of the last 50 years, joining Gordon Buehrig (1936 Cord), Zora Arkus-Duntov (1956 Corvette), Eugene “Bob” Gregoire (1940 Lincoln Continental), and Alex Tremulis (1946- 48 Tucker.)

1953 Studebaker Champion Starliner hardtop coupe, Studebaker National Museum, May 2014

The 1953 Studebaker Starliner is generally acknowledged as one of the finest automotive styling achievements in the 20th century and was the first full production American automobile which emulated post-war European sports car design.

== Early life ==
Robert Bourke Jr. was born in Chicago, IL to Robert E. Bourke and Ethel Hodder. His father was an architect, and Partner in the firm Mundie, Jensen, Bourke and Havens. His mother was a homemaker and died when he was six. He grew up in the Beverly area of south Chicago. As a young man he was very interested in airplanes and would ride his bike seven miles to the Ashburn Field airport in Cicero, IL to watch an early daredevil pilot, Speed Holman, run his aircraft through the paces. He was also interested in drawing and art and after high school enrolled at the Chicago Art Institute. He took fine art and design courses there and also some traditional college courses at Chicago University. Due to lack of funds during the depression he had to withdraw from school. He soon landed a job in the design department at Sears Roebuck, where he worked on such things as power tools, outboard motors, and radio cabinets. He also assisted with Coldspot refrigerators and washing machines.

Through a co-worker at Sears, Clare Hodgman, he was introduced to Virgil Exner. Exner was head of the Raymond Loewy and Assoc. Studebaker account in South Bend, IN. Bourke had always been interested in automotive design and was hired by Exner in 1941. Bourke relocated to South Bend, IN and in 1942 married Pearl Mildred Gualano, who was also from the Chicago area.

== 1940s at Studebaker and the 1949 Ford ==
During the WWII years, Bourke worked on Studebaker military contracts for Curtiss-Wright, including army trucks, specialized vehicles and new air-cooled turbocharged engines. Bourke's structural and mechanical engineering background, gained from his work at his father's architectural firm, added to his professional skillset necessary for these projects.

In the early 1940s, Bourke assisted Exner with the preliminary designs for the 1947 Studebaker line, including the Starlight coupe. While Exner is considered the final designer of the 1947 Starlight, Bourke's sketches from 1941 evidence that he was largely responsible for the overall body design and wrap-a round rear window treatment. The 1947 Starlight is considered a leader in post-war production automobile redesign due to its "flush-side" styling, wrap-around rear window and modern, compact low silhouette. At that time Studebaker had the ability to move more quickly in automobile redesign than the much larger Ford Motor Company and General Motors.

Exner was fired by Raymond Loewy in 1945, and by 1947 Loewy promoted Bourke to Manager and Chief Designer of the Studebaker South Bend office. Exner continued to work directly for Studebaker Corporation for several years and gave Bourke the responsibility for the redesign of the Studebaker R-series trucks, which was a quarter ton pickup. When it debuted in 1949 it was the first American production truck to have integrated fenders and inboard running boards, and the first production truck to have the manufacturer's name stamped on the back of the pickup body. Additionally, service accessibility was enhanced by allowing all instrumentation and underdash wiring to be accessed by the engine side of the firewall. Studebaker called this "Lift-the-Hood Accessibility". This basic truck body design was in production through 1954.

In late 1947 Bourke was asked to reduce staff due to Studebaker's need for cost cutting. One man laid off, Dick Caleal, contacted George Walker, who had the Ford design account. Walker told Caleal to work up an automobile design based on some specific critical dimensions, and deliver it to him in three weeks and if Walker liked what he saw he would hire Caleal. Bourke arranged to deliver a quarter-scale wooden buck and modeling clay to Caleal's residence, and with staff members John Bird, John Lutz and Holden “Bob” Koto assisted in building the prototype model. Walker liked the clay model, and had another prototype built by his in-house staff which was practically identical. Walker showed both to Ford and convinced Ford that due to their similarities this should be the newly redesigned 1949 production Ford. Ford management agreed

Bourke designed the front end including the grille detail, and the rear end and rear fenders, while Koto had more input on the whole body design. Essentially, the 1949 Ford was designed on a Formica kitchen table in a small bungalow in Mishawaka, IN, by a group of Loewy's Studebaker employees. It was a highly successful production car, with the styling carried through the 1951 model. The Automotive News, Fords 75th Anniversary Issue, June 1978, described the 1949 Ford as the “.. car that saved an empire..”

== Studebaker 1950-1956 ==
1950 Studebaker Champion Regal DeLuxe Starlight coupe, Louwman Museum, The Hague, Province of South Holland, Netherlands

Studebaker decided that for the 1950 model the basic body would be unchanged for cost saving measures, but it wanted an entirely new and different appearance. Bourke's team managed to lower the hood and developed the unique and well-recognized “spinner” (or “bullet” nose) front end for the 1950 Studebaker Commander. Studebaker sold more 1950 models than in any prior year, and this success solidified Loewy's contract with Studebaker for several more years.

In 1951 Studebaker decided it needed a newly designed automobile, and also was interested in creating a “show” car to better compete with Ford, General Motors and Chrysler who would have “show” cars at national and international automobile shows. Bourke and several of his staff, including Vince Gardner, Don Bruce and Bob Koto, went to work on a one-off “show” car but at the same time were instructed by Studebaker to continue work on the existing production models. Bourke states “The work load at this time was fantastic; we had design development programs covering standard ... production sedans as well as truck programs... My burning desire to design a car with a completely free hand ... required a fourteen hour day, seven days a week... But I was encouraged by visits after hours by Paul G. Hoffman (President) and Harold Vance (Board Chair). ”

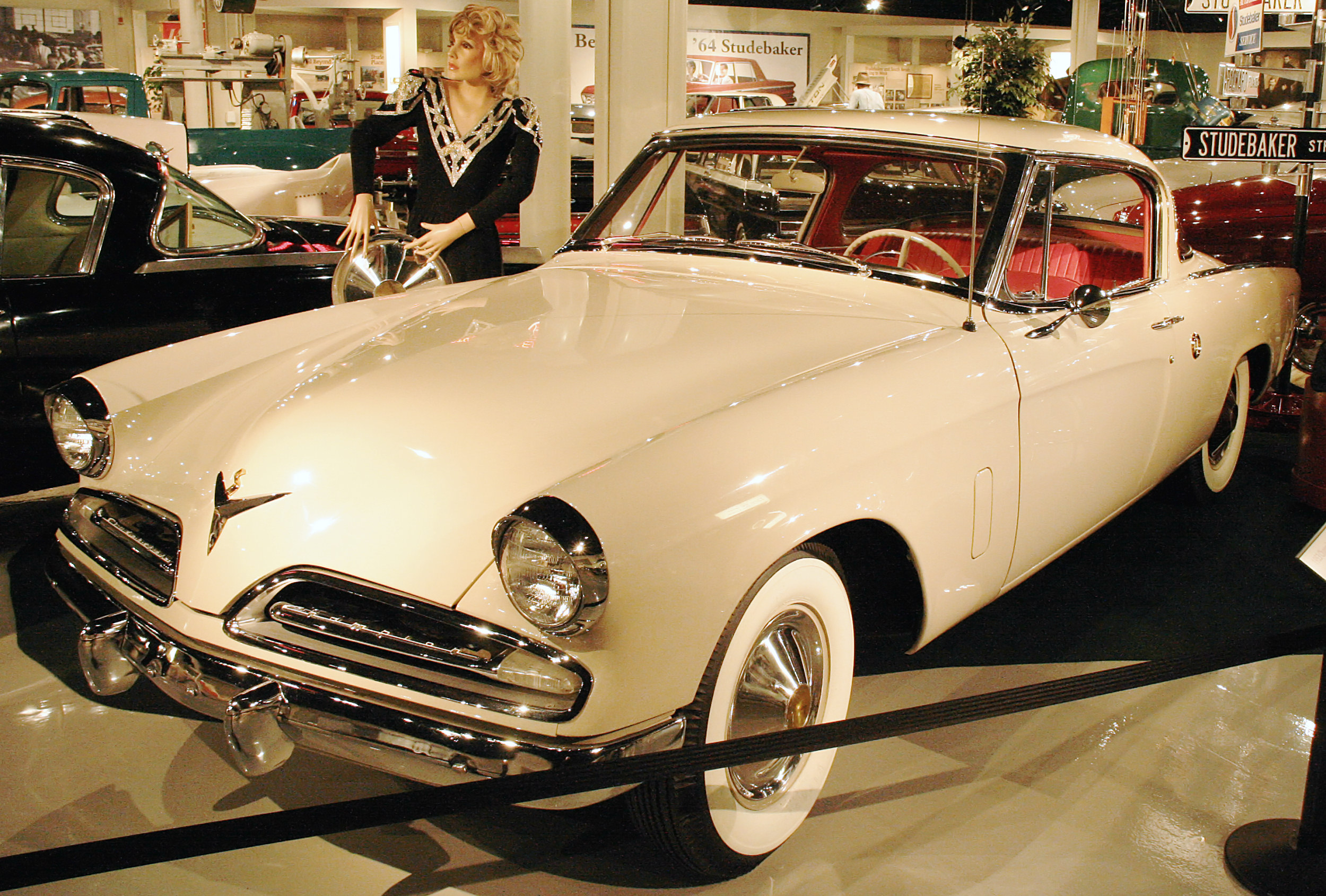
1953 Studebaker Champion Starliner hardtop coupe, Studebaker National Museum

At one point Harold Vance came to the design facility and told Bourke to keep the costs down on the “show” car. This was Bourke's first sense that the show car was being considered as a full production model! At this point Bourke became very focused on the engineering and production cost implications of the "show car.". Bourke developed three major styling elements; 1) he chose the longer wheelbase of the Land Cruiser rather than the standard Studebaker wheelbase, 2) he cut the rear bench in half and dropped the cushions down on each side of the driveshaft, and 3) he worked with the Chief engineer, Gene Hardig, to lower the roofline to only 56.3 inches, compared with the typical Detroit coupe height at that time of 63 inches.

After months developing both the planned production models and the show car, two ¼ sized clay models of the show car were finished. The Studebaker Board, its bankers and Loewy scheduled a review of the various production and show car designs. After reviewing the planned production models Vance asked to see the show car, which was in a back showroom. After thirty minutes and a few questions, the Board meeting was over. The following morning Bourke took a call from Vance, and Vance told him they decided to put the show car into production! Immediately thereafter the Studebaker Body Engineering Division and Chassis Department worked with Bourke's design staff to get the production prototype built, while meeting full production engineering and cost criteria.

In the fall of 1952 the dramatic and stylish 1953 Studebaker Starliner was introduced to the public in the Grand Ballroom of the Waldorf-Astoria Hotel in New York City. The February 2, 1953 issue of Time Magazine featured Harold Vance and the all new Starliner on its cover.

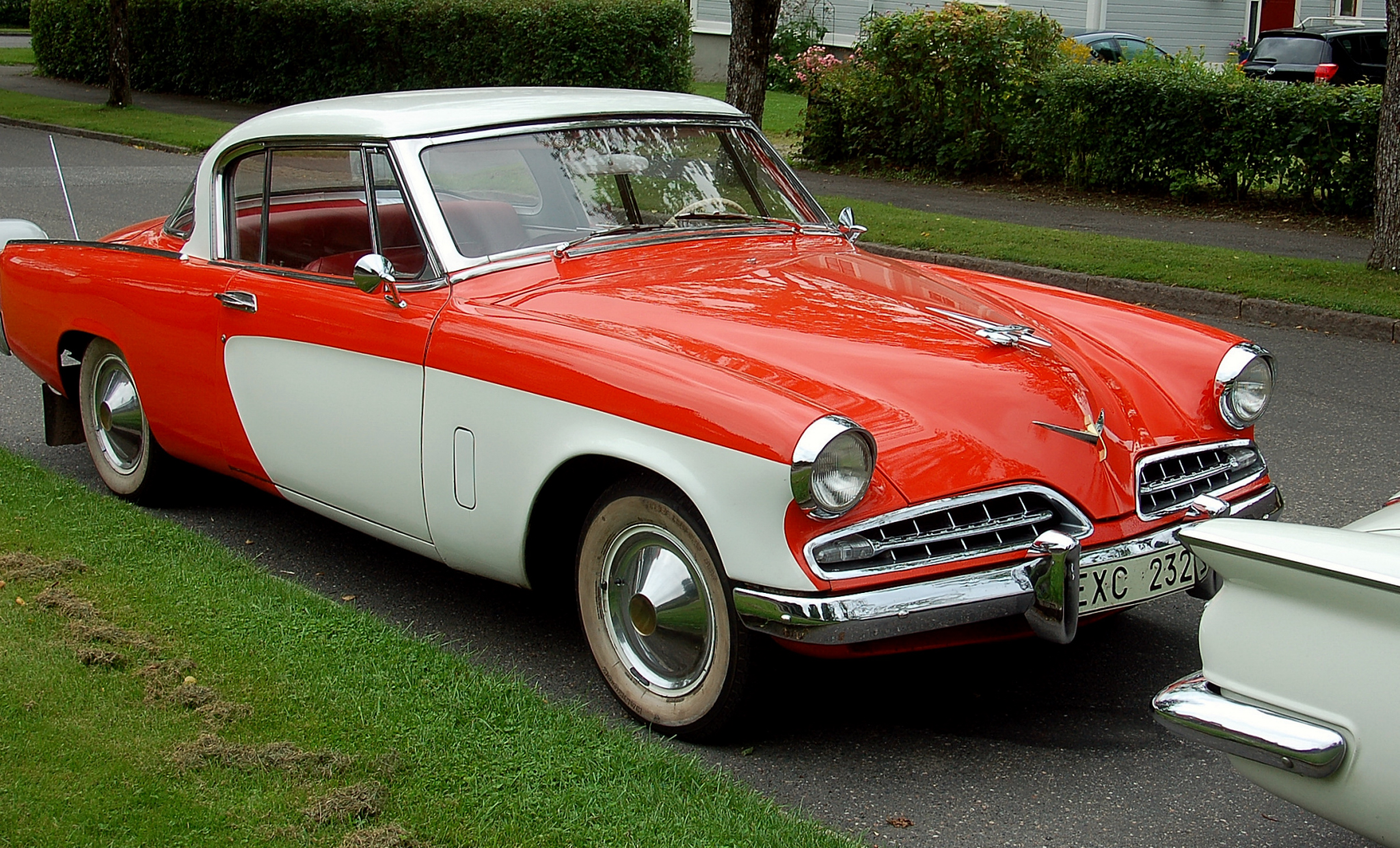
1954 Studebaker Champion Regal Starliner hardtop coupe

Studebaker Corporation continued to lose money due to outdated capital equipment and high labor costs, and merged with Packard in October 1954. During this time Bourke had begun work on a Studebaker “personal” sports car. While this concept did not go into production due to capital constraints, it and the 1955 Studebaker “Speedster” led to the development of the first Studebaker “Hawk.” The Hawk retained the Starliner body and was introduced in the 1956 model year. Bourke was instrumental in designing the Hawk original square mesh grille, which remained the focus of Hawk front end design for many years. Interestingly, the 1962 Studebaker GT Hawk continued to utilize the Starliner body design a full 11 years after Bourke had originally conceived it.

After the merger with Packard, its President James Nance became President of Studebaker-Packard. In 1955 he terminated the Loewy relationship with Studebaker, believing in-house design could perform as well, while being much less costly.

== The years after Studebaker ==
As the Loewy relationship with Studebaker wound down, Loewy offered Bourke a position in his Chicago office. During this time Bourke was involved with the design of the Greyhound Scenic Cruiser bus. He reacquainted with his friend Clare Hodgman, who headed product design for Loewy in New York, NY. In 1955 they opened their new industrial design firm in New York City, Hodgman-Bourke Inc.

Over the years Hodgman-Bourke's list of transportation clients included Mack Trucks, Superior Coach (div. of Sheller Globe Corporation), Volkswagen, Volvo, and Dodge. Other clients were General Electric, Minolta, GAF, Scott Atwater, AB Electrolux, Texaco, Wesson, Hamilton and DuPont.

In 1968 Bourke and James Yoder formed Air Plastics, Inc., which manufactured and sold food service trays to the major airlines. Bourke developed a locking configuration on the tray edges allowing the trays to stack and remain stable, which resolved a difficult food service problem for the airlines. The company remained a supplier to major airlines until the plastic hot food service trays were gradually retired in the late 1980s

Clare Hodgman retired in 1969 and Bourke formed R.E Bourke Associates in Westport, CT. R.E. Bourke Associates continued to provide industrial design services until Bourke retired in 1986. Anticipating the future, Bourke designed several low drag electric cars in 1975 for G.E.

Bourke states “In the final analysis, my main forte has been creative industrial design in conjunction with mechanical engineering and production. Automobiles, trucks, buses, and wheeled equipment including farm and material handling types have always been of great interest to me.”

In August, 2005 the US Postal Service issued a commemorative 37-cent stamp featuring the 1953 Studebaker Starliner.

Bourke had two sons, Robert E Bourke III and Richard L Bourke. He died on December 1, 1996, at the age of 80, and is interred, alongside his wife Pearl, at the family plot at Calvary Cemetery on the north shore of Chicago.

== See also ==
- Studebaker Silver Hawk
- Studebaker Champion
