= FM H-12-46 =

Type and origin
- Power type: Diesel
- Builder: Fairbanks-Morse
- Model: H-12-44
- Build date: October 1951 — January 1953
- Total produced: 30
Specifications
- Configuration
  - AAR: A1A-A1A
- Gauge: 4 ft 8 1/2 in (1,435 mm)
- Prime mover: FM 38D-8 1/8
- Engine type: 2-stroke diesel
- Aspiration: Roots blower
- Displacement: 6,222 in³ (101.8 L)
- Cylinders: 6 (Opposed piston)
- Cylinder size: 8.125 in × 10 in (206 mm × 254 mm)
- Transmission: DC generator, DC traction motors
- Loco brake: Straight air
- Train brakes: Air
Performance figures
- Maximum speed: 60 mph (97 km/h)
- Power output: 1,200 hp (895 kW)
Career
- Locale: North America

The FM H-12-46 was a light road switcher of Fairbanks-Morse design manufactured exclusively by the Canadian Locomotive Company from October, 1951–January, 1953 for the Canadian National Railway. Only thirty of the 1,200 hp, six-cylinder opposed piston engine locomotives were produced. The units (assigned #7600–#7629) were configured in an A1A-A1A wheel arrangement, mounted atop a pair of three-axle trucks.

Externally, they boasted many of the same Raymond Loewy design influences found on the larger and more powerful FM H-16-66 model, some of which were built during the same period. None of the units are known to exist today.
