= Studebaker Starlight =

- 1947 Studebaker 2-door 5-passenger coupe renamed Starlight in 1949 model year

Overview
- Manufacturer: Studebaker
- Production: 1947–1952
- Assembly: Studebaker Automotive Plant, South Bend, Indiana, United States; Studebaker Automotive Plant, Vernon, California, United States

Body and chassis
- Body style: 2-door 5-passenger coupe

The Studebaker Starlight was a 2-door 5-passenger coupe body style that was used by Studebaker Corporation of South Bend, Indiana (United States) from 1947 to 1955 on its Champion and Commander model series of automobiles. The 2-door coupe was not named Starlight until the 1949 model year. A hardtop coupe version was introduced in 1952 and named Starliner. In 1953, the 2-door 5-passenger body style was completely redesigned from top to bottom with a longer wheelbase and a lower roofline; the 2-door coupe with a center pillar was the Starlight, while the pillarless hardtop version was the Starliner.

== 1947 design ==
The 1947 body was designed by Virgil Exner, formerly of Raymond Loewy Associates, along the lines of the ponton style that had just gone mainstream after World War II. It was the first all-new postwar car in the United States.

=== Trunk ===
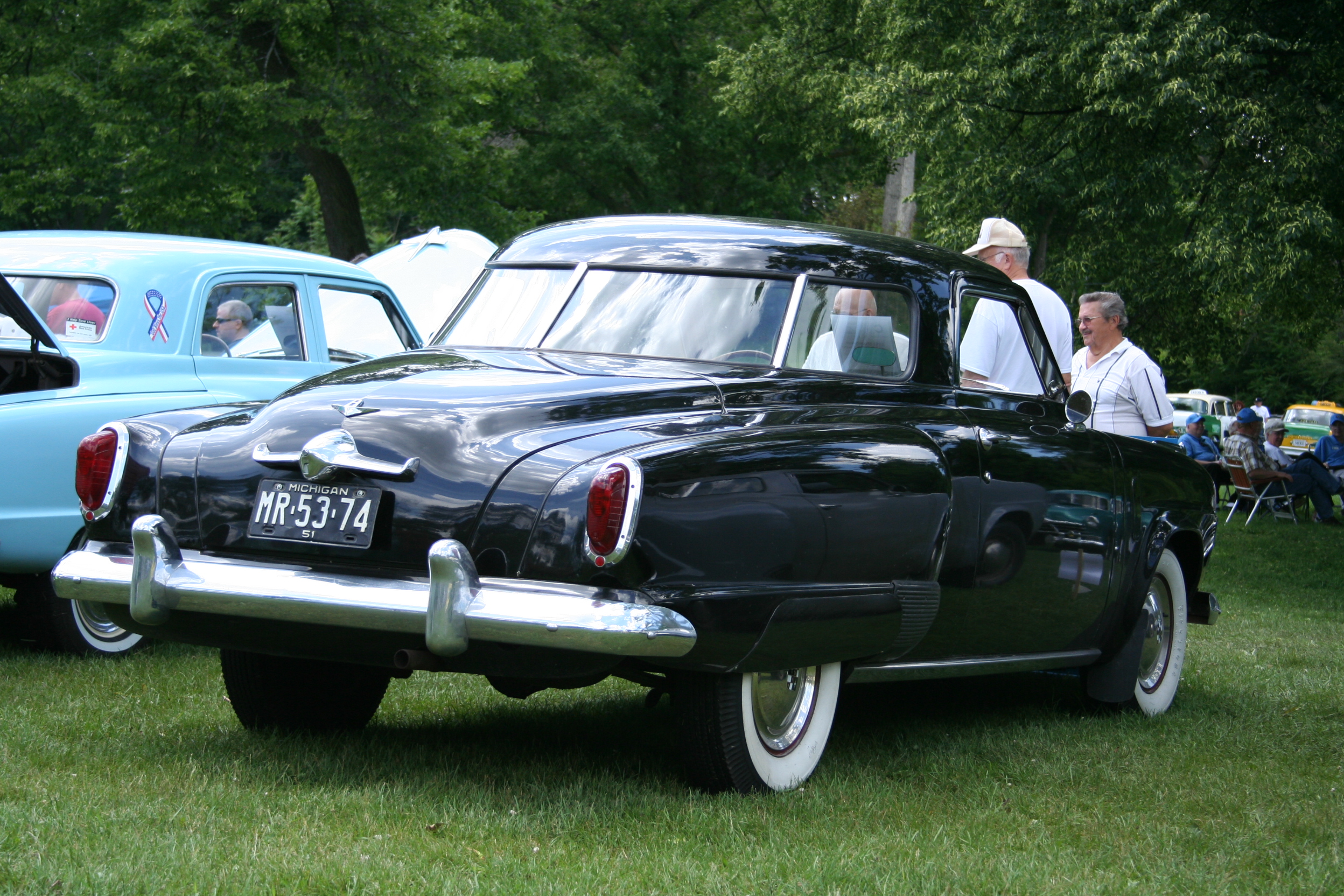
The trunk and rear wrap-around window of a 5-passenger 2-door coupe

The most striking feature was the extremely long (for a five-passenger car) hood-like cover over the luggage compartment of the sedan which was exaggerated on the Starlight. Critics of the radically styled models commented by asking the rhetorical question, "Which way is it going?" (Comedian Fred Allen quipped: "Next year Studebaker is coming out with a model that you won't be able to tell if it is going sideways".) The viewer's astonishment was compounded by the great expanse of the wrap-around rear window. Previously cars had tended to shroud back-seat passengers.

Wrap-around rear window

Unlike other pillared two-door sedans that use two side windows separated from the rear window by roof supports, Exner created a roof rounded at the rear with a wraparound window system that provided a panoramic effect, similar to a railroad observation car. The curved window was achieved with four fixed panels of glass. The roof was supported by two wide pillars (sometimes called "B" pillars) immediately behind the doors and in front of the wraparound back window. The body style was originally named, simply, "5-passenger coupe"; however, for the 1949 model year it was renamed Starlight Coupe.

The car's unique profile provided the Studebaker marque with an easily recognized body shape copied as soon as possible by the other US manufacturers in their 1949 models, and appeared to be influenced by the Lockheed P-38 Lightning, particularly by the shortened fuselage with wrap around canopy. Studebaker followed a styling trend soon after the war of adopting fighter aircraft appearances on their products, as demonstrated on Buick and Cadillac vehicles starting in 1948.

=== Specifications ===
Engines	Transmissions	HP	Wheelbase	Length
169.9 CID 1-bbl. 6-cylinder/232 CID 2-bbl. V-8*	3-speed manual, w\optional overdrive/Automatic.**	80/102	119 in (3,023 mm)	204.4 in (5,192 mm)

- V-8 introduced in 1951.
- Automatic transmission introduced in 1950.
1947 Studebaker Champion Deluxe 5-passenger coupe, front view

1947 Studebaker Champion Deluxe 5-passenger coupe, back view

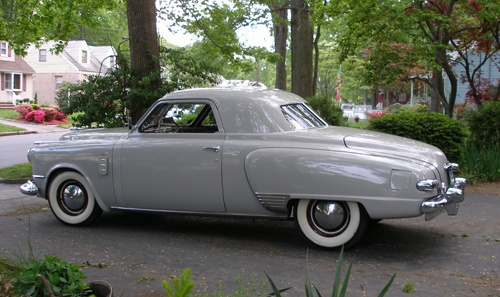
1947 Studebaker Commander
3-passenger Business Coupe

1949 Studebaker Champion Regal Deluxe Starlight Coupe

== Facelift ==
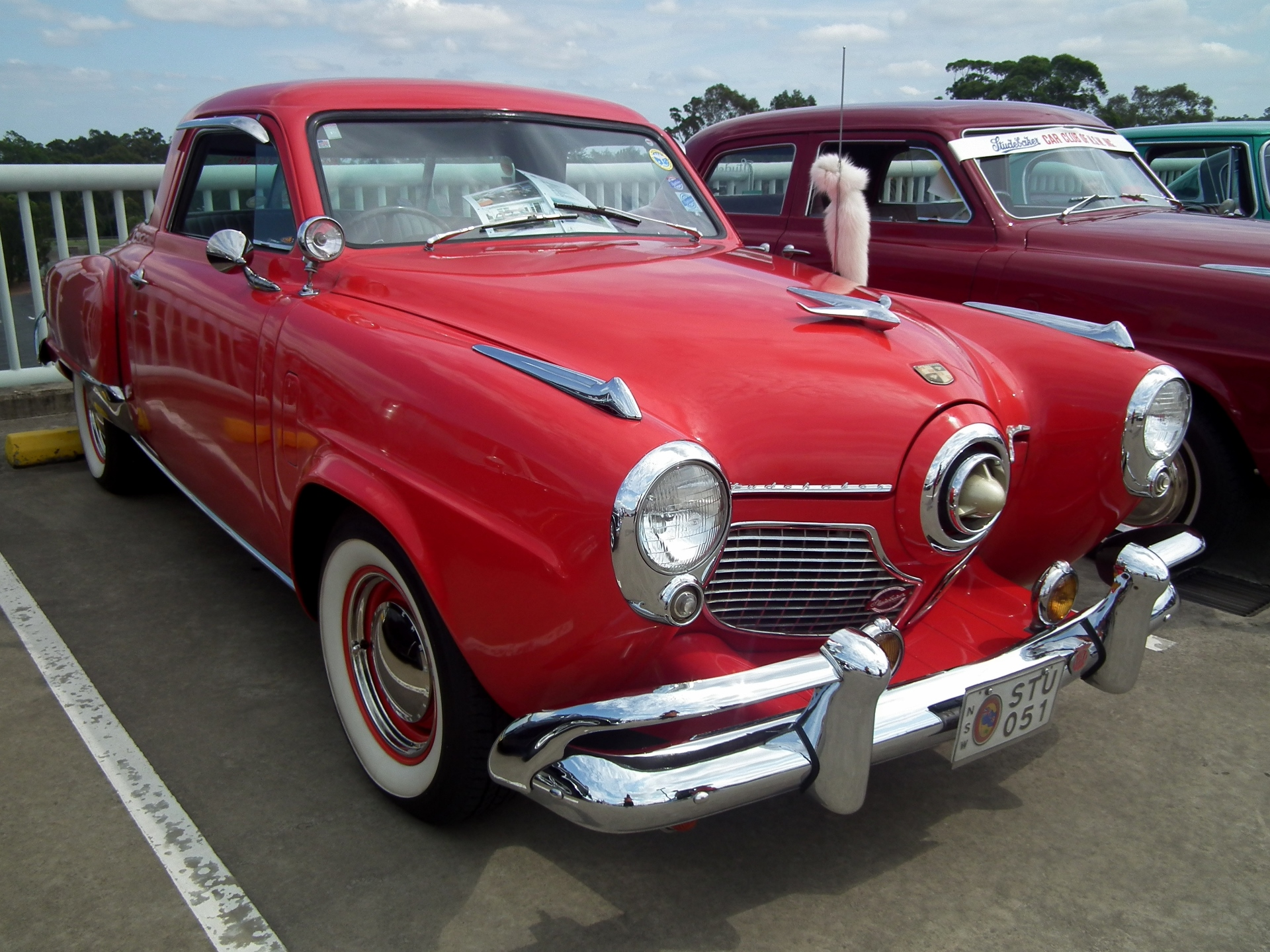
1951 Studebaker Champion Starlight coupe, with "bullet nose"−"spinner" front.

For 1950 and 1951, all Studebakers received a freshening of the 1947 design with the addition of the "bullet nose" (or "spinner") front sheet metal design, sharing a similar appearance with the 1949 Ford sedan. When combined with the Starlight body style, Studebakers looked comparatively futuristic at the time. In 1952 the "buttet nose" was replaced with a more conventional front end. This version of the Starlight body style, with the rear wrap-around window, continued until the end of the 1952 model year; it was sold side by side with a new 1952 pillarless hardtop "Starliner" version of the 5-passenger 2-door coupe with a more conventional three-piece rear window and inverted-triangle "C-pillar".

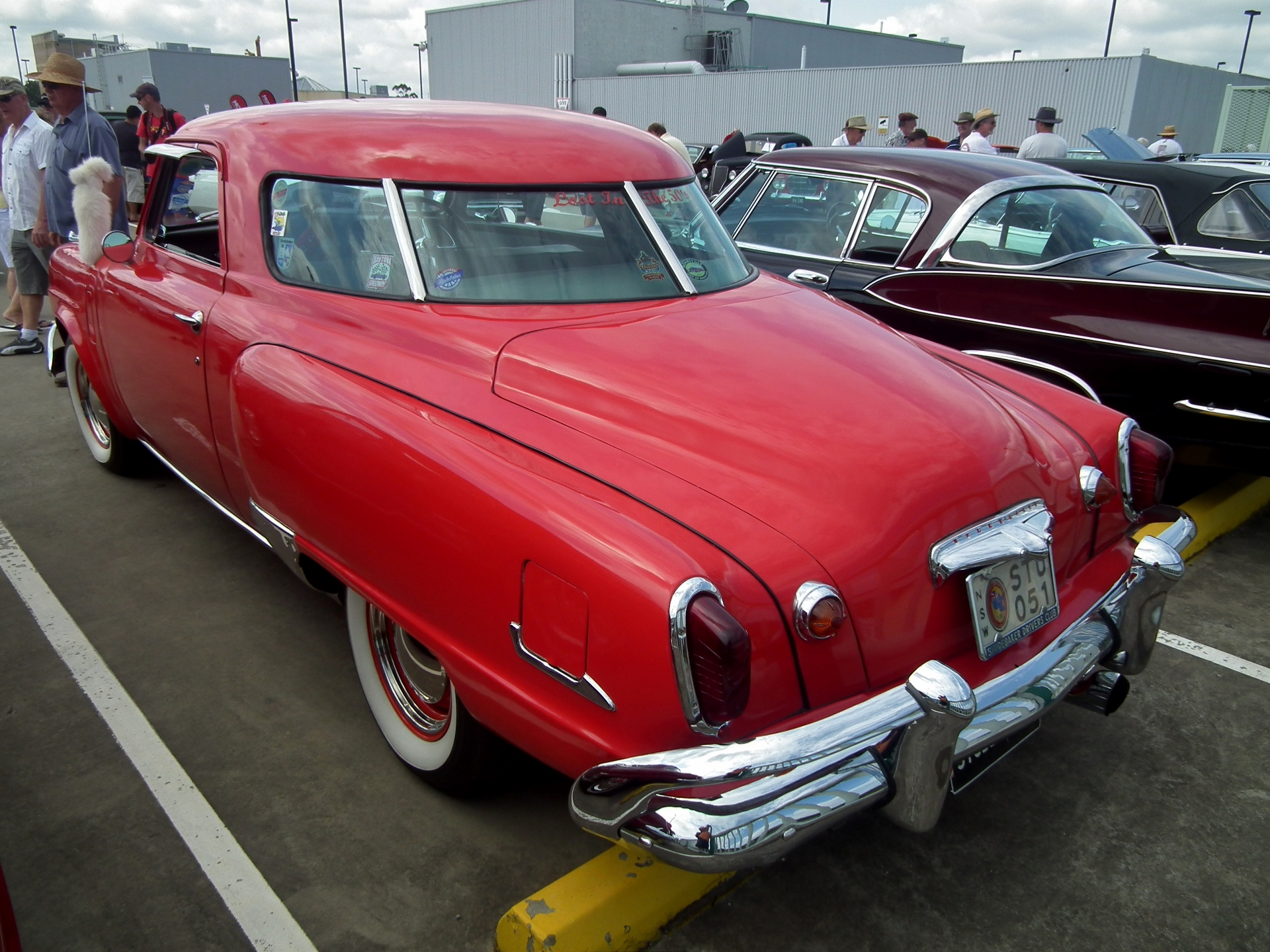
1951 Studebaker Champion Starlight coupe, with 4-piece wrap-around rear window

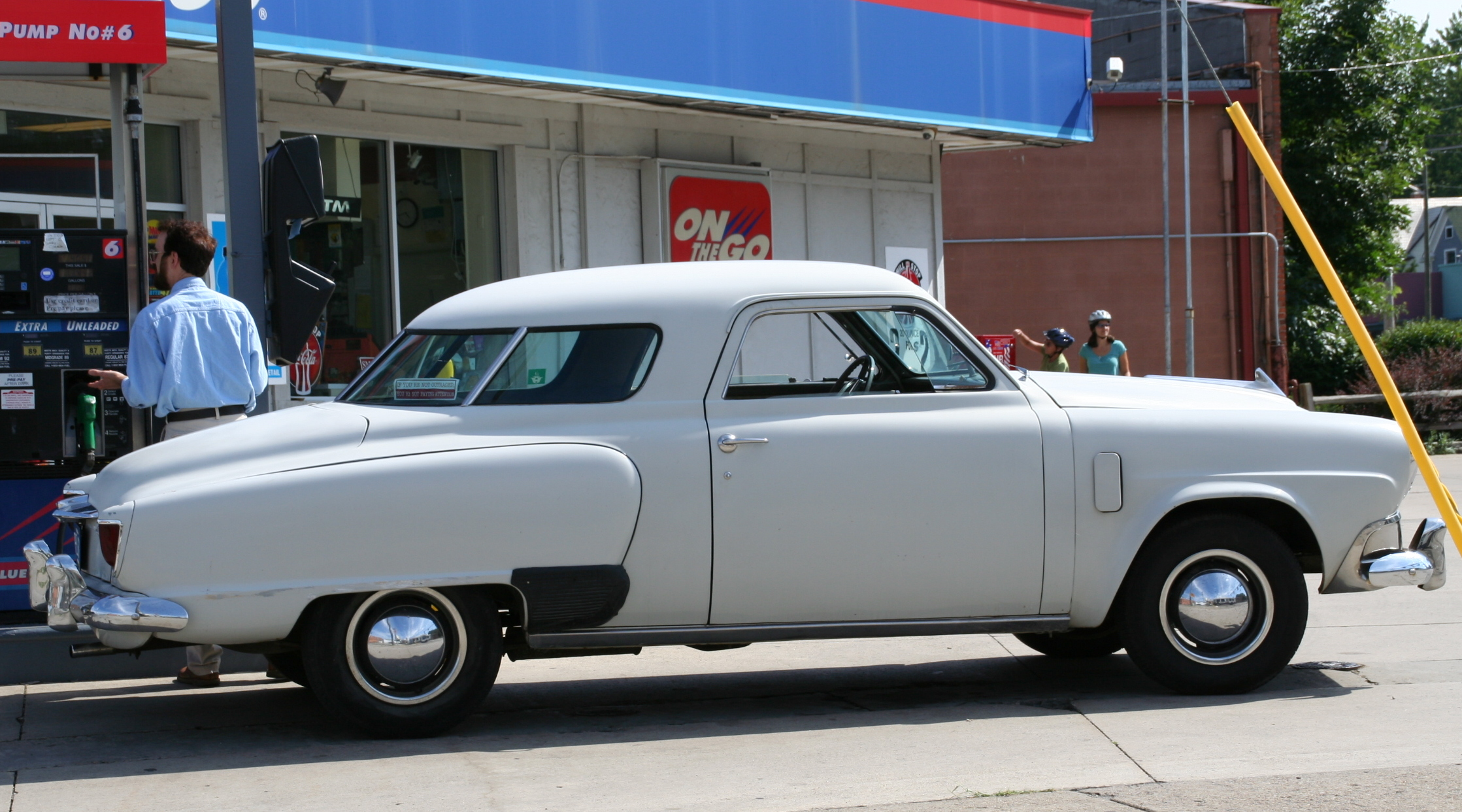
1952 Studebaker Champion Starlight Coupe, with 4-piece wrap-around rear window

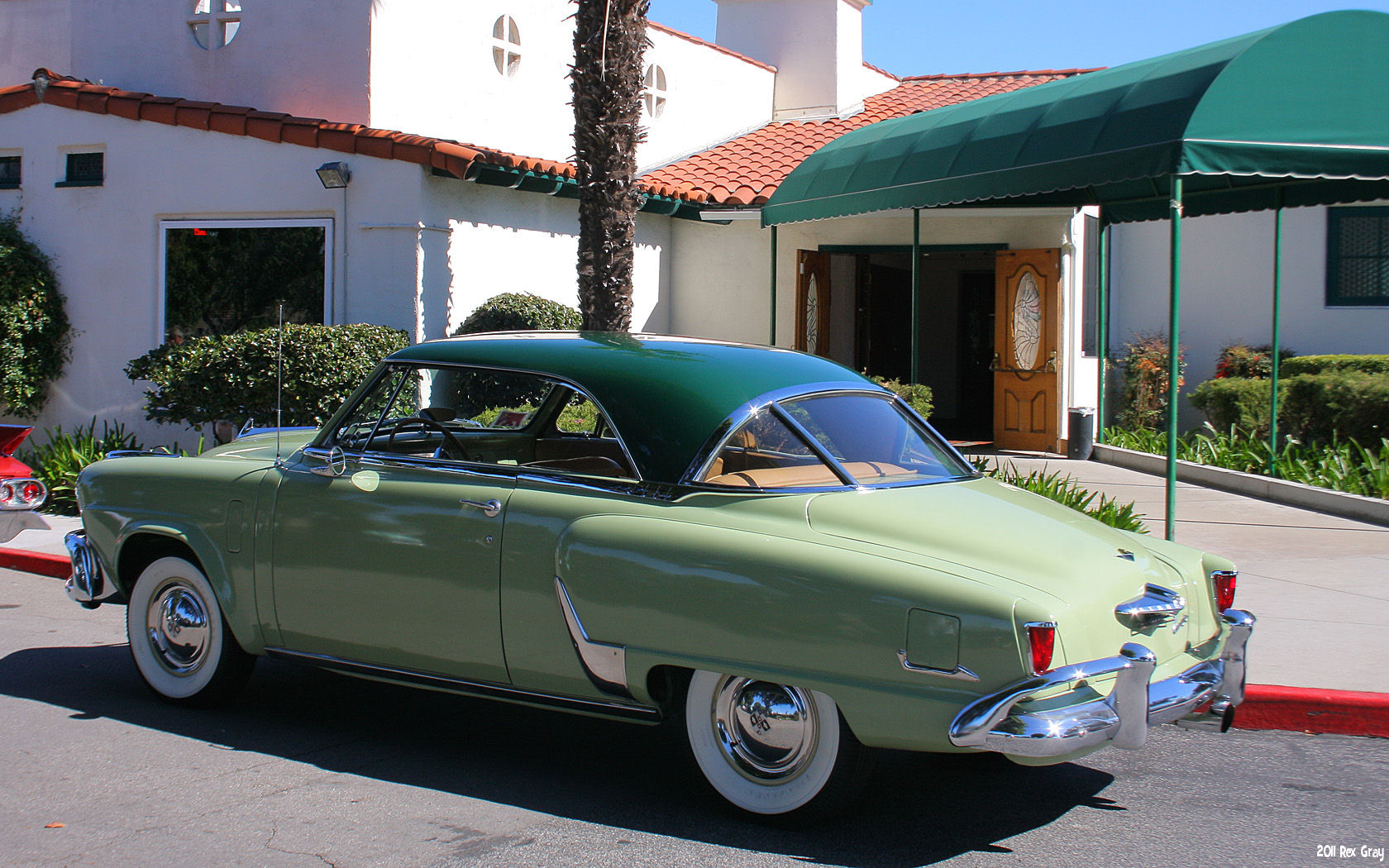
1952 Studebaker Commander Starliner Hardtop with 3-piece conventional rear window

== 1953 design ==
For 1953, designer Robert Bourke, head of Raymond Loewy Associates Studebaker design operation, radically redesigned all Studebaker cars. While the Studebaker sedans rode on an 116 in (2,900 mm) wheelbase, Bourke chose to place the sports car-like 2-door 5-passenger coupes on Studebaker's longer 120 in (3,000 mm) wheelbase. He also dropped the seats down on each side of the driveshaft and lowered the roofline to 56.3 in (1,430 mm), when the typical Detroit coupe height was then at 63 in (1,600 mm).

Offered in both Champion and Commander model ranges, the coupes were available as pillared and hardtop body styles. Hardtop coupes were designated Starliners while the Starlight designation was applied to the five window pillared coupes. The February 2, 1953 issue of Time Magazine, which featured the all-new low-slung 2-door 5-passenger Starliner hardtop coupe on its cover, carried the following analysis:

Long, low and racy, the new model is a completely new breed of car, radically different from anything ever mass-produced in the U.S. It combines the low-slung beauty, sporty look and most of the road-holding qualities of European sports cars with some of the comfort and most of the durability of the American family car.

The styling on both these later (1953) cars influenced the Hillman Minx of the late 1950s and 1960s, which was also designed by Raymond Loewy.

In late 1952 Studebaker produced one 1953 Commander convertible as an engineering study to determine if the model could be profitably mass-produced. The car was based on the 1953 2-door hardtop coupe. The car was later modified to 1954-model specifications, and was occasionally driven around South Bend by engineers. Additional structural reinforcements were needed to reduce body flexure. Even though the car was equipped with the 232 cu. in. V-8, the added structural weight increased the car's 0-60 mph acceleration time to an unacceptable level. In addition, the company did not have the financial resources to add another body type to the model line. The company's leadership mistakenly thought the 2-door sedans, 4-door sedans, and 1954 Conestoga wagon would sell better than the 2-door coupes, so the company's resources were focused on production of the sedans and the wagon. When the prototype convertible was no longer needed, engineer E. T. Reynolds ordered the car to be stripped and the body sent to the secret graveyard at the proving grounds. A non-engineering employee requested permission to purchase the car, rather than see it rot away with the other prototypes. Chief engineer Gene Hardig discussed the request with E. T. Reynolds. They agreed to let the employee purchase the car on the condition that the employee never sell it. In the 1970s, the car was re-discovered behind a South Bend gas station and no longer owned by the former employee. After eventually passing through several owners, the car is now in a private collection of Studebaker automobiles.

For 1955 the pillared Starlight reverted to "5-passenger coupe", the pillarless "Starliner" became "5-passenger hardtop."

For 1956 these 5-passenger 2-door coupes with pillars were heavily modified and reissued as the Studebaker Hawk series.

In 1958, Studebaker again applied the Starlight name to a body style, this time on its first full-sized hardtop models since 1952. With lackluster sales and a switch to the compact Lark, the company no longer was in need of the Starlight moniker and it was permanently retired at the end of the model year.

Oldsmobile would attempt an effect similar to the Starlight in 1977 with its Toronado XS model. Unlike the Studebaker, however, advances in auto glass production allowed the Toronado wrap around window to be manufactured in one sheet of glass that was bent using "hot wire" technology.

1953 Studebaker Starliner hardtop coupe, Studebaker National Museum

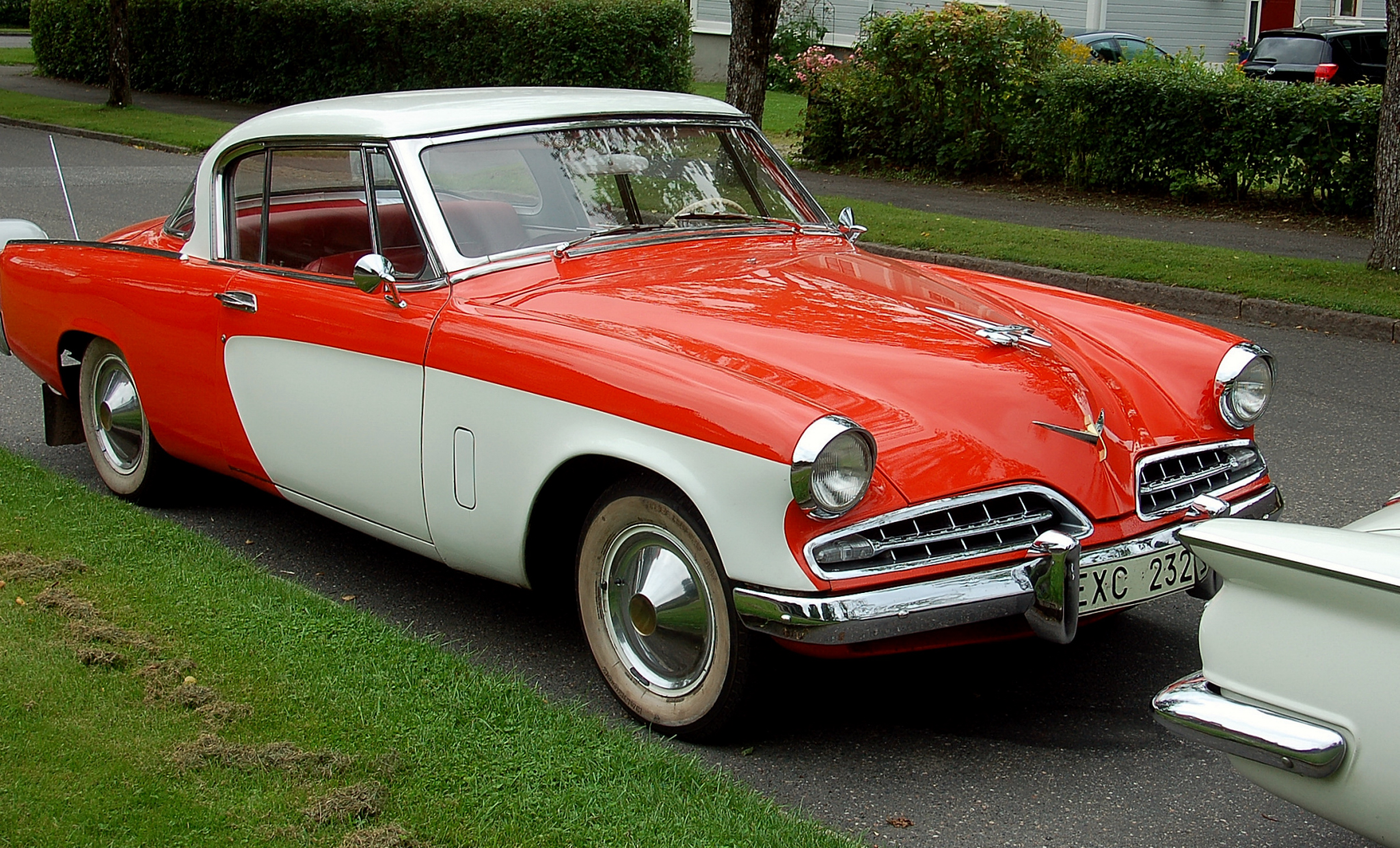
1954 Studebaker Champion Starliner hardtop coupe

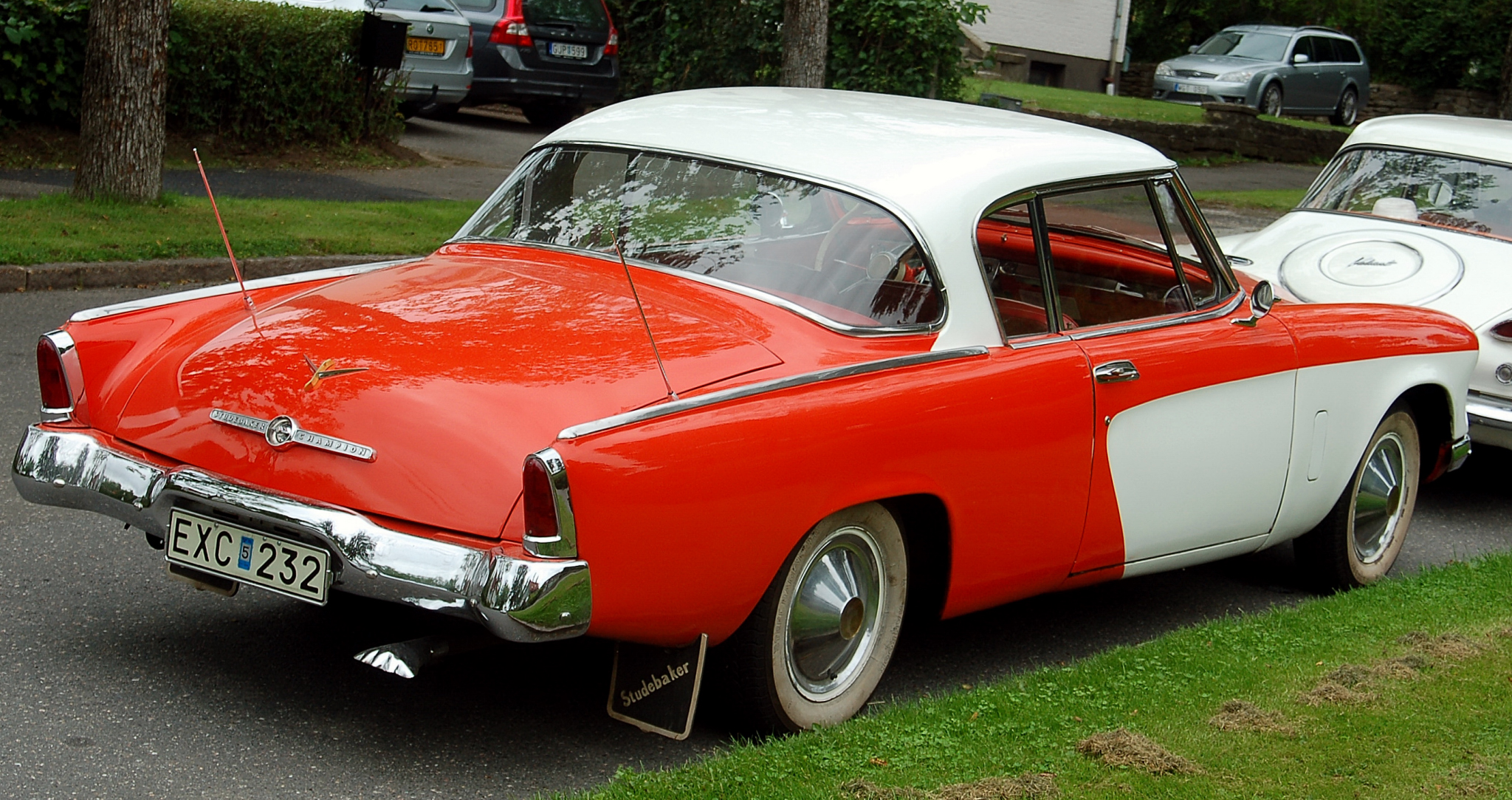
1954 Studebaker Champion Starliner hardtop coupe

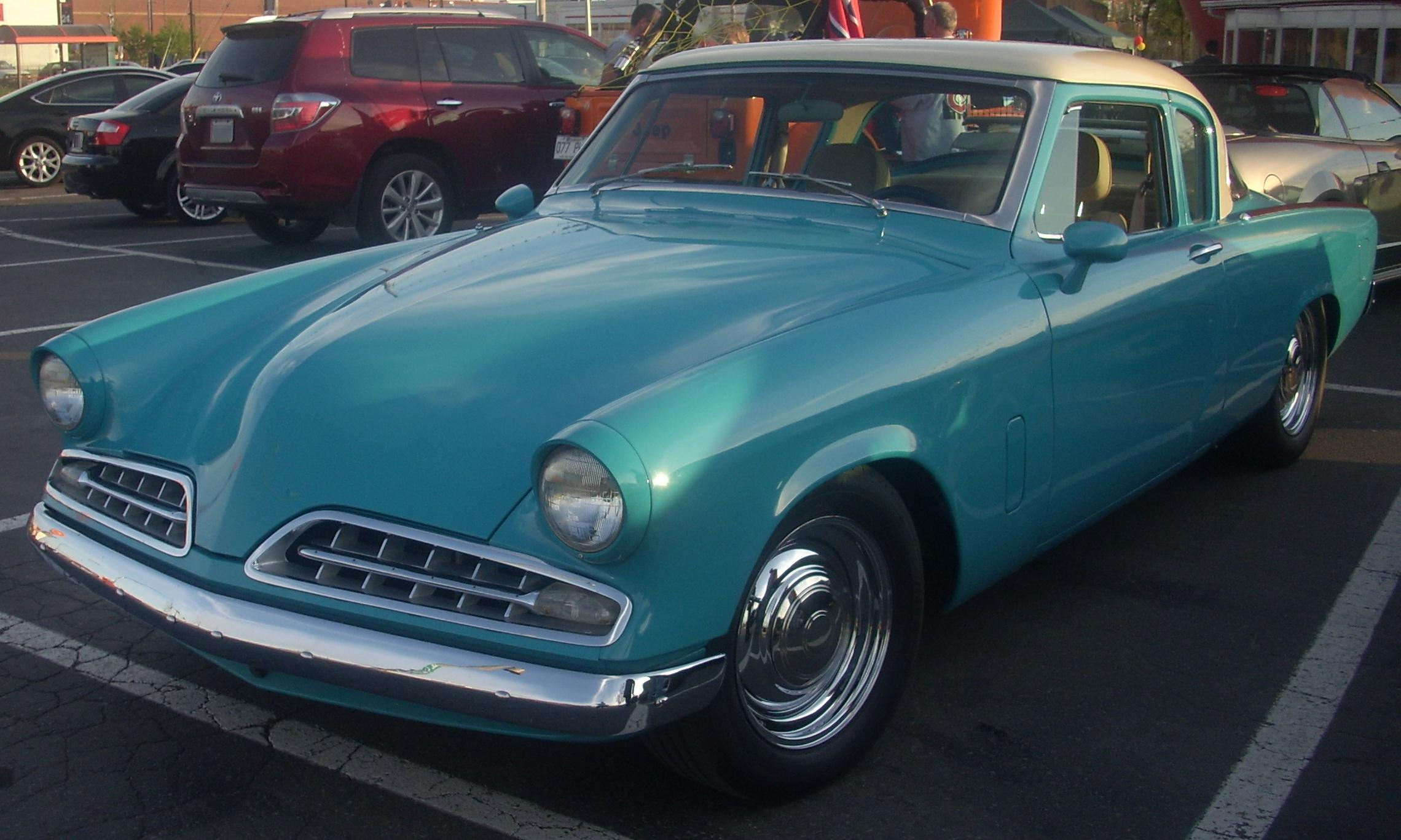
1954 Studebaker Champion Starlight coupe

1954 Studebaker Champion Starliner, Tour Auto 2014, Circuit de Dijon-Prenois.
