= FM H-10-44 =

Model of American 1000hp diesel switcher

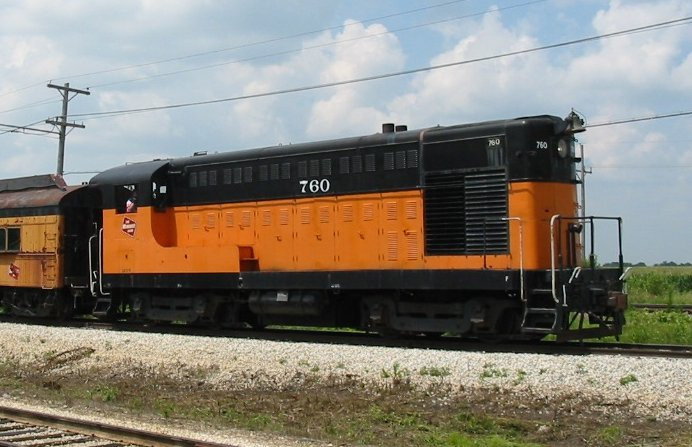
- Milwaukee Road 760, an H-10-44 and the first FM locomotive, preserved in operating condition at Illinois Railway Museum.
Type and origin
- Power type: Diesel-electric
- Builder: Fairbanks-Morse
- Model: H-10-44
- Build date: August 1944–March 1950
- Total produced: 195
Specifications
- Configuration
  - AAR: B-B
  - UIC: Bo'Bo'
- Gauge: 4 ft 8 1/2 in (1,435 mm)
- Trucks: AAR type A
- Wheel diameter: 40 in (1,016 mm)
- Minimum curve: 29.50 (194 ft (59.13 m) radius)
- Wheelbase: 33 ft 6 in (10.21 m)
- Length: 48 ft 10 in (14.88 m)
- Width: 10 ft 2 in (3.10 m)
- Height: 14 ft 6 in (4.42 m)
- Loco weight: 240,000 lb (108.9 t)
- Prime mover: FM 38D-8 1/8
- Engine type: Two-stroke diesel
- Aspiration: Roots blower
- Displacement: 6,222 cu in (101.96 L)
- Generator: Westhse 481-A
- Traction motors: (4) Westhse 362-D
- Cylinders: 6 (Opposed piston)
- Cylinder size: 8.125 in × 10 in (206 mm × 254 mm)
- Loco brake: Straight air
- Train brakes: Air
Performance figures
- Maximum speed: 60 mph (97 km/h)
- Power output: 1,000 hp (746 kW)
- Tractive effort: 40,440 lbf (179.9 kN)
Career
- Locale: North America
- Disposition: Three preserved, remainder scrapped, 1 replica on display

The FM H-10-44 was a switcher locomotive produced by Fairbanks-Morse from August, 1944–March, 1950. The units featured a 1,000-horsepower (750 kW), six-cylinder opposed piston prime mover, and were configured in a B-B wheel arrangement mounted atop a pair of two-axle AAR Type A trucks, with all axles powered. Many H-10-44s received modifications that increased their horsepower rating to 1,200 hp (890 kW).

The Raymond Loewy-designed carbody featured a slanted nose, sloping hood lines, and (considered to be its most distinguishing feature) a protruding roof visor mounted on the rear of the cab. These styling cues were carried through to the H-10-44's successor, the FM H-12-44, until September 1952 when the exterior design was "Spartanized" to reduce production costs.

A total of 195 units were built for American railroads. Four intact examples of the H-10-44 are known to survive today, all of which are owned by railroad museums. Most notable of these is Milwaukee Road #760 (originally delivered as #1802), the first Fairbanks–Morse locomotive constructed in their own plant, which is preserved and operational at the Illinois Railway Museum. The Milwaukee Road #767 (delivered as #1809) is preserved at the National Railroad Museum in Green Bay, Wisconsin, and was operational until 2007 when it suffered a failed bearing. Another example is former Hallet Dock Company HD-11, which is now at the Lake Superior Railroad Museum in Duluth, Minnesota.

In 1954, Milwaukee Road H-10-44 #1811 (Now 781) and Milwaukee Road “ribside” caboose #01900 wrecked between Monticello and New Glarus, Wisconsin. A wooden rail bridge had been previously burned in a grass fire, and both the locomotive and caboose struck the bridge. Both are now restored and on display at the Brodhead Historical Society in Brodhead, Wisconsin.

A reproduction H-10-44 locomotive sits atop the Wood Family Fishing Bridge, a former railroad bridge which crosses the Rock River several hundred yards south of the foundry where the H-10-44s were built, in Beloit, Wisconsin.

== Units produced ==
Image	Railroad	Quantity	Road numbers	Notes
	Apache Railway	2	100, 200	
	Atchison, Topeka and Santa Fe Railway	3	500–502	
	Baltimore and Ohio Railroad	10	300–309	Renumbered 9700–9709
	Chehalis Western Railroad (Weyerhaeuser)	2	492, 493	
	Chicago and North Western Railway	21	1036, 1048–1065, 1070, 1082	
	Chicago, Indianapolis and Louisville Railway (“Monon”)	1	18	
	Chicago, Milwaukee, St. Paul and Pacific Railroad (“Milwaukee Road’)	23	1802–1818, 1820–1825	Renumbered 760–776, 778–783; 760 (ex-1802), 767 (ex-1809) and 781 (ex-1823) are preserved in museums
	Chicago, St. Paul, Minneapolis and Omaha Railway (“Omaha Road”)	5	94–98	
	Columbia and Cowlitz Railway	1	D-1	to Pacific Great Eastern Railway
	Denver and Rio Grande Western Railroad	4	120–123	122 to Frisco 286
	Fairbanks-Morse (demonstrator unit)	1	10L45	to Milwaukee Road 1819; renumbered 777
	Indianapolis Union Railway	9	10–18	
	Kentucky and Indiana Terminal Railroad	10	48–52, 55–59	
	Minnesota Western Railway	1	51	to Minneapolis, Northfield and Southern Railway 11, to Hallet Dock Company HD-11
	New York Central Railroad	7	9104–9110	to Penn Central 8204–8210
	New York Central (Pittsburgh and Lake Erie Railroad)	4	9100–9103	
	New York, Chicago and St. Louis Railroad (“Nickel Plate Road”)	9	125–133	to Norfolk and Western Railway 2125–2133
	Pennsylvania Railroad	55	5980–5986, 5997–5999, 9080–9099, 9184–9196, 9288–9299	to Penn Central 8211-8265
	Pittsburgh, Chartiers and Youghiogheny Railway	1	1	
	St. Louis-San Francisco Railway	12	270–281	
	Terminal Railroad Association of St. Louis	4	700–703	
	Union Pacific Railroad	5	DS1300–DS1304	
	Wabash Railroad	4	380–383	to Norfolk and Western 3380–3383
	Weyerhaeuser Timber Company	1	481	
	Total	195		
