= Coldspot =

Defunct brand of appliances sold by Sears

Coldspot was a brand by US retail company Sears that existed from 1928 to 1976, when it was replaced with the Kenmore brand. The brand was originally created for a line of refrigerators. Other products sold under the Coldspot brand included freezers, dehumidifiers, and window air conditioning units. Many of these products were manufactured for Sears by Seeger Refrigeration, which was purchased by Sunbeam, giving the new name Seeger-Sunbeam. The company was then purchased by The Whirlpool Corporation under various model prefixes, most notably the "106" model prefix which can be found on the model number placard on the unit. All units were manufactured at the Evansville, IN at the International Harvester Plant once known as the "Icebox" before Whirlpool closed the plant in 2009.

In 1934, Raymond Loewy redesigned the Coldspot refrigerator into what Time magazine would later praise as "a single smooth, gleaming unit of functional simplicity", increasing its sales five-fold within two years.
