= FM H-16-66 =

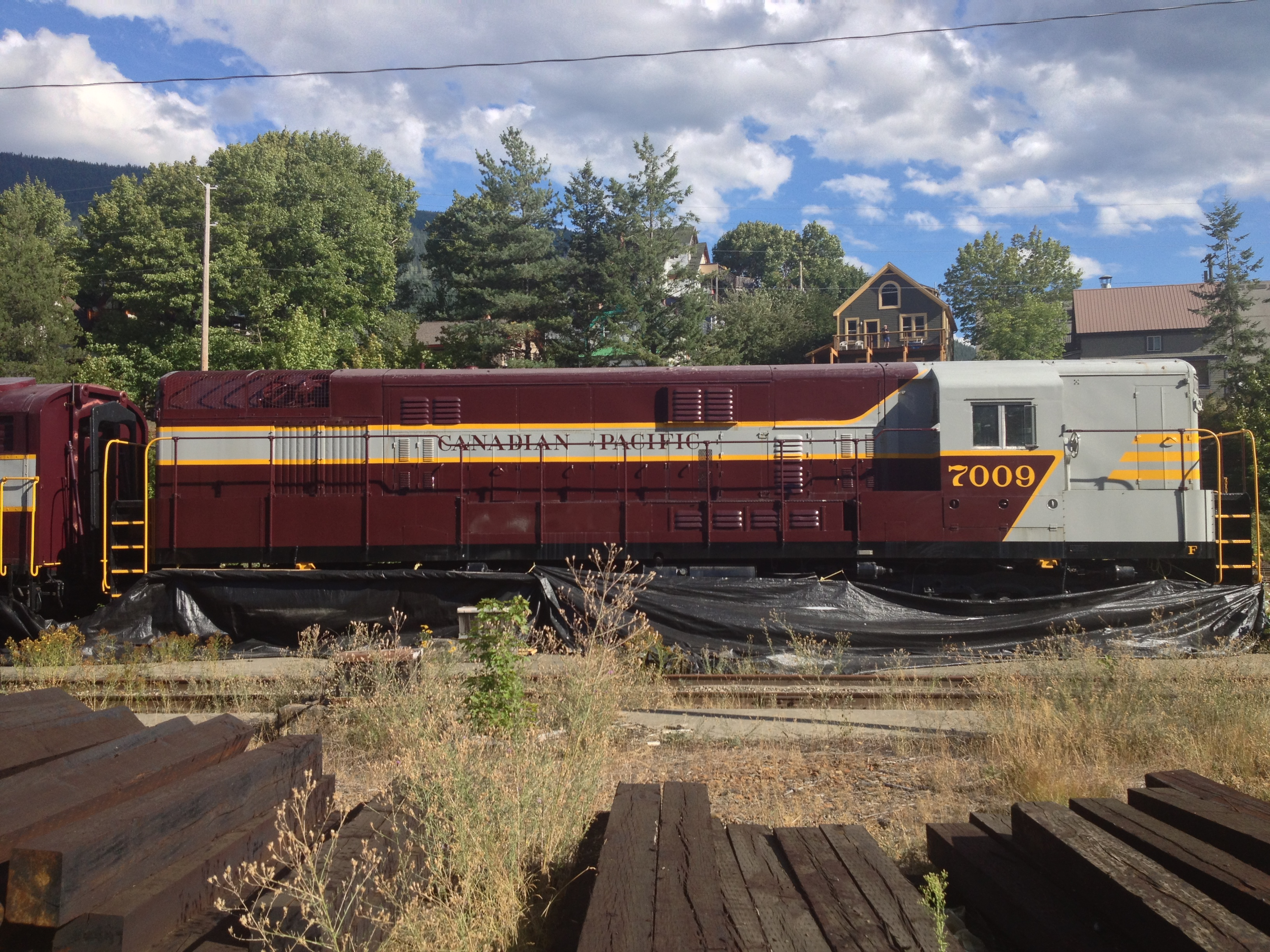
- An FM H-16-66 painted as CPR 7009
Type and origin
- Power type: Diesel-electric
- Builder: Fairbanks-Morse
- Model: H-16-66
- Build date: 1951–1958
- Total produced: 59
Specifications
- Configuration
  - AAR: C-C
- Gauge: 4 ft 8 1/2 in (1,435 mm) standard gauge
- Trucks: Baldwin-style Commonwealth or Tri-mount
- Wheel diameter: 42 in (1,067 mm)
- Minimum curve: 22° (260 ft or 79.25 m radius)
- Wheelbase: 42 ft 3 in (12.88 m)
- Length: 56 ft 10 1/4 in (17.33 m)
- Width: 10 ft 7 1/4 in (3.23 m)
- Height: 14 ft 9 in (4.50 m)
- Loco weight: 286,000 lb (130,000 kg; 130 t)
- Prime mover: FM 38D-8 1/8
- Engine type: Two stroke, opposed piston diesel
- Aspiration: Roots blower
- Displacement: 8,295 cu in (135.93 L)
- Generator: Westinghouse 472 BZ
- Traction motors: (6) Westinghouse 370-GL
- Cylinders: 8 cylinders (16 pistons)
- Cylinder size: 8.125 in × 10 in (206 mm × 254 mm)
- Loco brake: Straight air / Dynamic
- Train brakes: Air
Performance figures
- Maximum speed: 65 mph × 80 mph (105 km/h × 129 km/h)
- Power output: 1,600 hp (1.19 MW)
- Tractive effort: 112,000 lbf (498.2 kN)
Career
- Nicknames: Baby Train Master

The H-16-66 was a 1,600 horsepower (1.2 MW) locomotive, with a C-C wheel arrangement that was manufactured by Fairbanks-Morse from January, 1951 until October, 1958 as a smaller alternative to their better known FM H-24-66 "Train Master" locomotive. With an 8-cylinder prime mover developing 1600 hp compared to the H-24-66's 2400 hp from as 12 cylinder engine, the H-16-66 was commonly referred to as the "Baby Train Master". Although sharing a common model designation, four different carbody variants existed with a total of only 59 locomotives produced.

== Preserved units ==
Former Alcoa H-16-66 #721001 is privately owned, and since 12 November 2012 has been located adjacent to the Canadian Pacific Railway rail yard at Nelson, British Columbia. Although never on the roster of the CPR, it has been repainted in the CPR's 1950s and 1960s "Tuscan and Grey" colour scheme, and bears the fictional numbering CPR 7009. This corresponds to the last in a number series formerly reserved for diesel demonstrators on the CPR. It is displayed alongside CPR C-liner 4104, which has also been repainted in the tuscan and grey colour scheme. The "Baby Train Master" and C-liner have been placed on static display beside the restored historic Nelson CPR station. The siting of these locomotives here is fitting, as the CPR division around Nelson was one of the final redoubts of Fairbanks-Morse / Canadian Locomotive Company power in North America, and the former Nelson shop was among the last to specialize in the maintenance of these units.

The Tennessee Valley Railroad Museum added unit F3060 (originally number 24) to its collection thanks to a donation from the Tennessee Valley Authority. The unit was built in October, 1958 and spent its entire working life at TVA's Gallatin Power Plant near Gallatin, Tennessee until its retirement in 1997. Plans are for the locomotive to be moved and displayed in time for the start of the museum's year-long 60th anniversary celebration beginning Oct. 14, 2021.

== Units produced by Fairbanks-Morse (1951–1958) ==
Image	Railroad	Quantity	Road numbers	Notes
	Chicago and North Western Railway	45	1510–1514, 1605–1612, 1668–1683, 1691–1700, 1901–1906	
	Chicago and North Western Railway affiliate Chicago, St. Paul, Minneapolis and Omaha Railway	6	150, 168–172	
	Chicago, Milwaukee, St. Paul and Pacific Railroad	6	2125–2130	Renumbered 550–555; 553–555 renumbered 547–549
	Squaw Creek Coal Company (Alcoa)	1	721001	Preserved
	Tennessee Valley Authority	1	24	Renumbered F3060, donated to the Tennessee Valley Railroad Museum, Arrived August 21, 2021.
	Total	59		
