= Railway Museum of British Columbia =

Railway museum in Squamish, BC, Canada

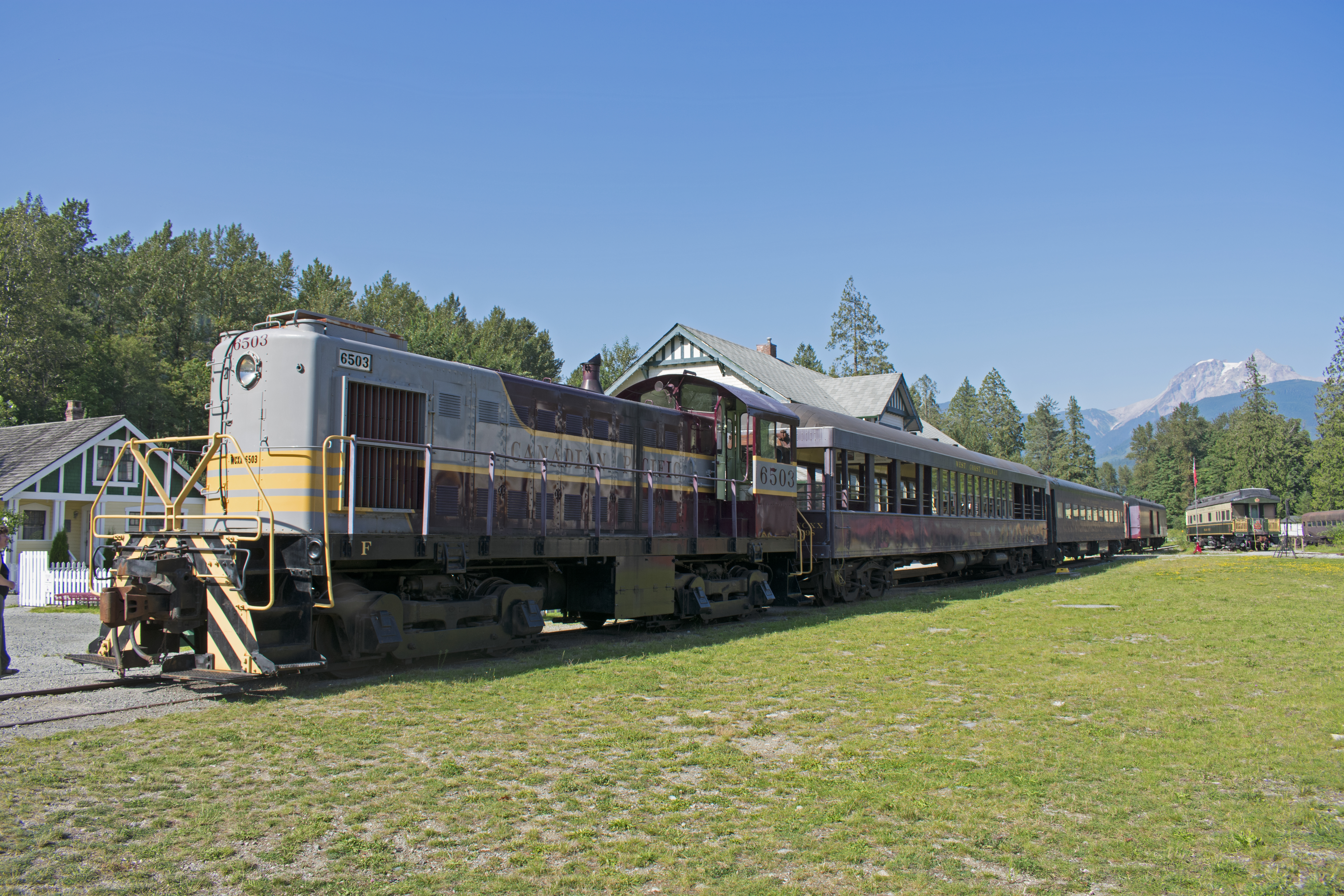
- Switcher No. 6503 and coaches at the station
- Locale: Squamish, British Columbia
- Coordinates: 49°43′41″N 123°09′38″W
- Connections: Canadian National Railway Company

Commercial operations
- Built by: West Coast Railway Association
- Original gauge: 4 ft 8 1/2 in (1,435 mm) standard gauge

Preserved operations
- Operated by: West Coast Railway Association
- Reporting mark: WCXX
- Stations: Mainline: 1
- Length: 1 km (0.62 mi)
- Preserved gauge: 4 ft 8 1/2 in (1,435 mm)

Preservation history
- May 25, 1990: Lease agreement signed with District of Squamish
- August 1991: Pacific Great Eastern car shop moved to site
- May 1, 1994: First rail equipment operated at the park
- July 10, 1994: Opened as West Coast Railway Heritage Park
- July 1996: West Coast Mini Rail built
- Headquarters: Squamish, British Columbia

Website
- wcra.org

The Railway Museum of British Columbia, formerly known as the West Coast Railway Heritage Park, (reporting mark WCXX) is a heritage railway in Squamish, British Columbia, Canada, operated by the West Coast Railway Association.

The museum runs excursion trains over Canadian National track throughout the year. Their primary event is the North Pole Express, a short operation hauled by two diesel locomotives. They also host the Sea to Sky Model Train and Hobby Show and Buddy and Friends Children's Festival, and previously operated a Day Out with Thomas event.

== History ==
The West Coast Railway Association was established in 1961 by a group of enthusiasts, who operated rail excursions in British Columbia with historical rail equipment. As their collection grew, the association began making plans to open a museum in the 1980s. Squamish was chosen as the site, and a sublease agreement was signed on 25 May 1990 with the District of Squamish for a 49,000-square-metre (12-acre) plot. Construction began the following year in 1991, when the association purchased a former Pacific Great Eastern car shop and had it moved to their site in August. After two years of construction, they moved their first pieces of equipment into the park on 1 May 1994, hauled by PGE RS-1 No. 561.

The museum, named the West Coast Railway Heritage Park, had a grand opening ceremony on 10 July 1994 and began its first season, attracting 4,300 guests in its first year. In July 1996, a ridable miniature railway named the West Coast Mini Rail was opened.

The regularly scheduled Royal Hudson excursion train, hauled by ex-Canadian Pacific Royal Hudson No. 2860, brought a considerable amount of passengers to Squamish, and more specifically, to the Heritage Park. On 2 October 1999, the annual Association of Railway Museums Conference took place at the site, during which No. 2860 was chartered to participate in and unbeknownstly marked the end of its second career, as mechanical issues followed in the proceeding months. With the cancellation of the excursion in 2001 and the unnecessary storage of the locomotive in BC Rail's North Vancouver Steam Shops, No. 2860 was leased to the District of Squamish and West Coast Railway Association for preservation at the Heritage Park. It was hauled to Squamish by FP7A No. 4069 on 13 May 2002 and parked besides the Mac Norris Station with several coaches. It was later moved to the Car Shop track around 2004.

In 2021, the Heritage Park was renamed to the Railway Museum of British Columbia, and a blacksmith shop, a Pacific Great Eastern fire hall, a print shop, and a general store were opened.

After 21 years of operating an annual Day Out With Thomas, the event was cancelled in 2025 due to the exchange rate on the United States dollar, as most licensed props, such as the Thomas the Tank Engine replica locomotive, were from the United States. Day Out With Thomas was replaced by a similar event, titled the Buddy and Friends Children's Festival, which focuses on PGE 2-6-2ST No. 2 disguised as fictional steam locomotive "Buddy".

== Equipment ==
=== Locomotives ===
Locomotive details
Number	Image	Type	Model	Built	Builder	Former owner	Status
2		Steam	2-6-2ST	1910	Baldwin Locomotive Works	Pacific Great Eastern Railway	Display
25		Diesel	80-Ton	1947	General Electric	Vancouver Wharves	Display
182		Diesel	RS-1	1951	American Locomotive Company	Great Northern Railway	Display
551		Diesel	65-Ton	1948	General Electric	Pacific Great Eastern Railway	Display
561		Diesel	RSC-3m	1951	Montreal Locomotive Works	Pacific Great Eastern Railway	Operational
941		Diesel	70-Ton	1949	General Electric	British Columbia Electric Railway	Display
960		Diesel	Electric	1912	American Locomotive Company/General Electric	British Columbia Electric Railway	Display; recently cosmetically restored
1404		Diesel	FP7Au	1953	General Motors Diesel	Algoma Central Railway	Display
2860		Steam	4-6-4	1940	Montreal Locomotive Works	Canadian Pacific Railway	Display
4069		Diesel	FP7A	1952	General Motors Diesel	Canadian Pacific Railway	Operational
4459		Diesel	F7B	1953	General Motors Diesel	Canadian Pacific Railway	Display
6503		Diesel	S-3	1951	Montreal Locomotive Works	Canadian Pacific Railway	Operational
6520		Diesel	FP9Au	1957	General Motors Diesel	Canadian National Railway	Operational
8000		Diesel	DRS-4-4-1000	1948	Baldwin Locomotive Works	Canadian Pacific Railway	Under cosmetic restoration

=== Passenger cars ===
Passenger car details
Number	Name	Image	Type	Built	Builder	Former owner	Notes
8	Alberta		Business car	1929	CPR Angus Shops	Canadian Pacific Railway	
16	British Columbia		Official car	1890	Barney and Smith Car Company	Canadian Pacific Railway	Oldest piece of rail equipment in the museum
50	Northern Summit		Business car	1924	Pullman Company	Pacific Great Eastern Railway	Previously served as the private business car of BC Premier W.A.C. Bennett
58	Lions Club		Lounge car	1920	Bethlehem Steel Corporation	British Columbia Railway	Privately owned by Squamish Lions Club
167	Clinton		Interurban/sleeper car	1924	American Car and Foundry Company	Pacific Great Eastern Railway	
598	Henry Pickering		Open observation car	1914	CPR Angus Shops	Canadian Pacific Railway	
623			Rules instruction car	1934	Milwaukee Road	Pacific Great Eastern Railway	
714	H "Bud" Butterworth		Troop sleeper	1943	Pullman-Standard Company	Pacific Great Eastern Railway	
722			Baggage-express car	1943	Pullman-Standard Company	Pacific Great Eastern Railway	
1090			Parlour observation car	1910	Barney and Smith Car Company	Great Northern Railway	Previously owned privately by Trevor Mills; possibly will be scrapped
1246	Dunraven		Dining car	1918	Pullman Company	Canadian National Railway	
1910	Pullman Spirit		Business car	1910	Pullman Company	Canadian National Railway	Privately owned by David Walmsley
2263	Cowichan River		Display car	1950	Canadian Car and Foundry/Canadian Pacific Railway	Canadian Pacific Railway	
2271	Quesnel		Coach car	1950	Canadian Car and Foundry/Canadian Pacific Railway	Canadian Pacific Railway	
2280	Patricia Anne		Display car	1950	Canadian Car and Foundry/Canadian Pacific Railway	Canadian Pacific Railway	
2291	Kootenay River		Display car	1950	Canadian Car and Foundry/Canadian Pacific Railway	Canadian Pacific Railway	
2514			Colonist car	1905	CPR Angus Shops	Canadian Pacific Railway	
3218	Jackson & James Drummond		Café-coach car	1954	Canadian Car and Foundry	Canadian National Railway	Originally named the Bill and Dorothy Lahr
3223			Café-coach car	1954	Canadian Car and Foundry	Canadian National Railway	
3704			Baggage-mail car	1948	Canadian Car and Foundry	Canadian Pacific Railway	
4908	Nanaimo River		Mail-boxcar	1937	National Steel Car	Canadian Pacific Railway	
5161	Marjatta		Coach car	1919	Canadian Car and Foundry	Canadian National Railway	
5569	Harry and Margaret Bluck		Coach car	1954	Canadian Car and Foundry	Canadian National Railway	
5596	Paul D. Roy		Coach car	1954	Canadian Car and Foundry	Canadian National Railway	
5623	Porteau		Coach car	1954	Canadian Car and Foundry	Canadian National Railway	
5652	Capilano		Coach car	1954	Canadian Car and Foundry	Canadian National Railway	
7186			Combine car	1919	Pullman Company	Canadian National Railway	
9622	McDonald Creek		Baggage-generator car	1955	National Steel Car	Canadian National Railway	
15006			Track inspection car	1954	Pullman-Standard Company	Canadian National Railway	Privately owned
BC-14			RDC-1	1962	Budd Company	British Columbia Railway	Privately owned; display
BC-21			RDC-1	1962	Budd Company	British Columbia Railway	Operational
BC-33			RDC-3	1957	Budd Company	Pacific Great Eastern Railway	Display

=== Freight cars ===
Passenger car details
Number	Image	Type	Built	Builder	Former owner	Notes
273		Hopper	1950	National Steel Car	British Columbia Railway	
894		Tank car	1958		FMC Corporation	
1383		Flatcar	1956	National Steel Car	British Columbia Railway	
1817		Caboose	1955	Pacific Great Eastern Railway/National Steel Car	Pacific Great Eastern Railway	
1859		Caboose	1969	Pacific Great Eastern Railway Squamish Shops	British Columbia Railway	
1910		Tank car	1937		British Columbia Railway	
1926		Tank car	1921	American Car and Foundry Company	British Columbia Railway	
2055		Crane	1916	Ohio Locomotive Crane	Vancouver Creosoting Company	
4182		Boxcar	1958	National Steel Car	British Columbia Railway	
5172		Boxcar	1971	National Steel Car	British Columbia Railway	
6002		Snowplough	1957	National Steel Car	Pacific Great Eastern Railway	
6003		Snowplough	1956	National Steel Car	Pacific Great Eastern Railway	
11474		Caboose	1965	Baldwin Locomotive Works/Great Northern Railway	Burlington Northern Railroad	
55365		Snowplough	1929	Eastern Car Company	Canadian National Railway	
436631		Caboose	1914	Canadian Pacific Railway	Canadian Pacific Railway	Previously displayed at a McDonald's in Vancouver

== Gallery ==
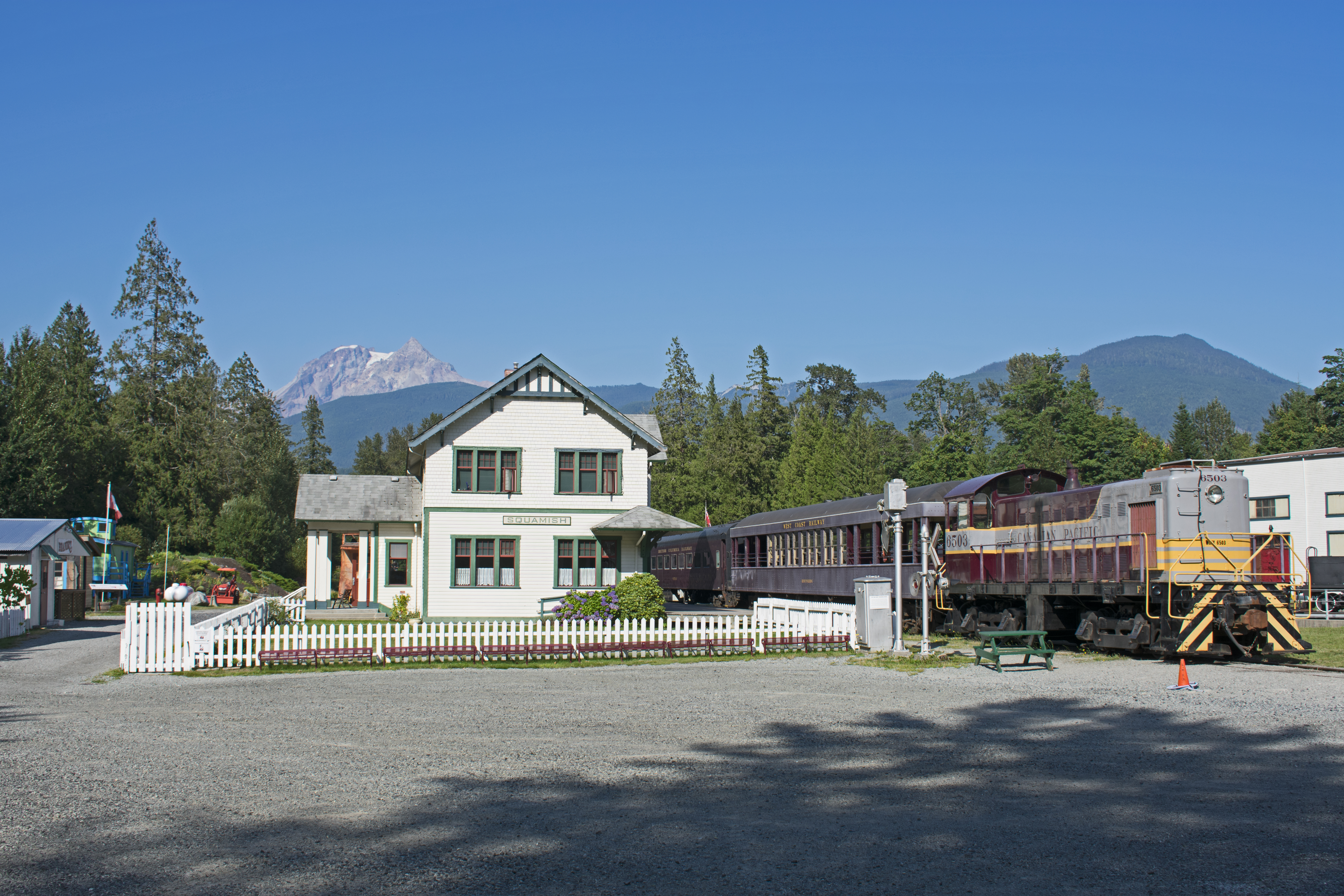
Canadian Pacific No. 6503 and two coaches besides the Mac Norris Station

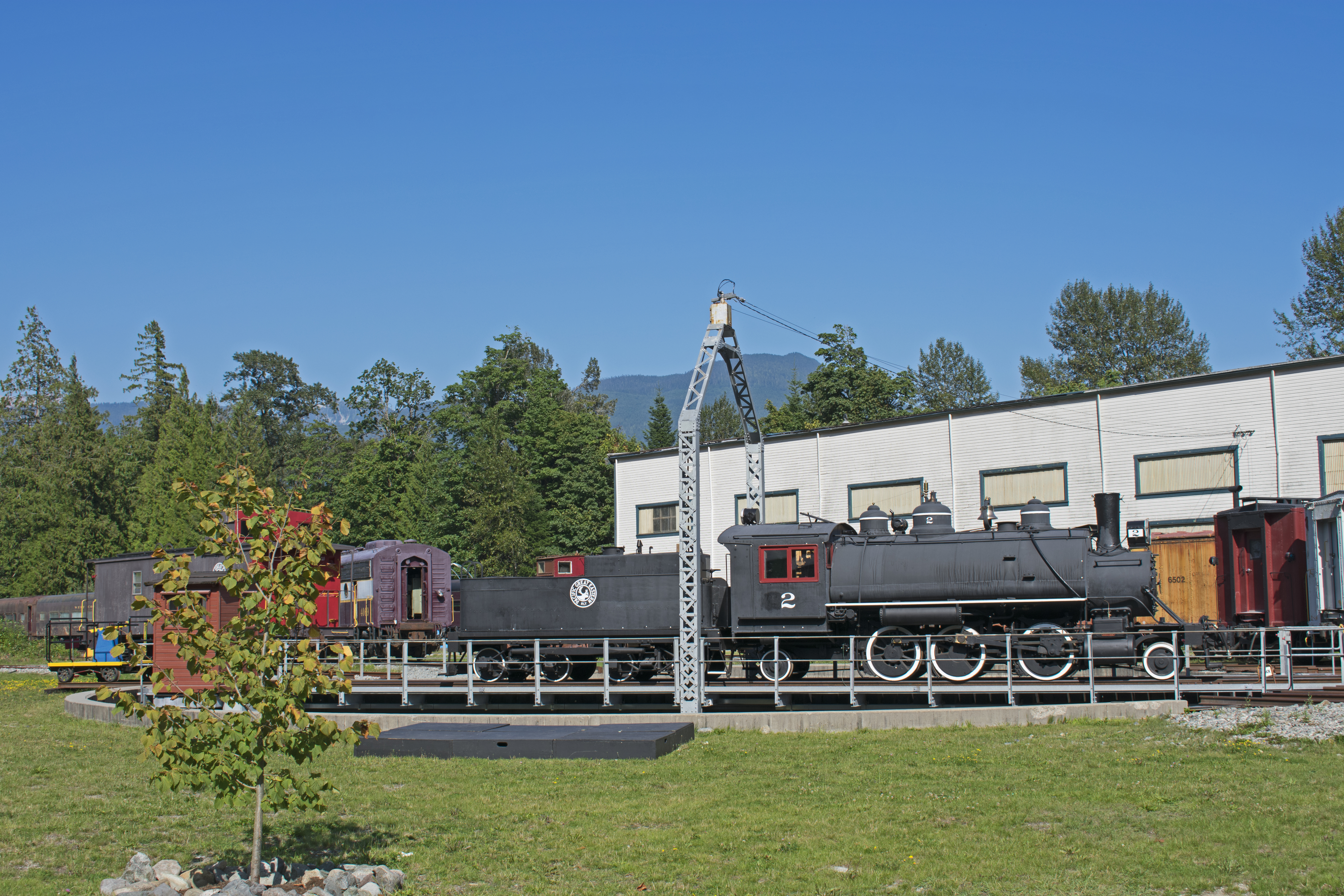
Pacific Great Eastern No. 2 on the turntable on 8 August 2019

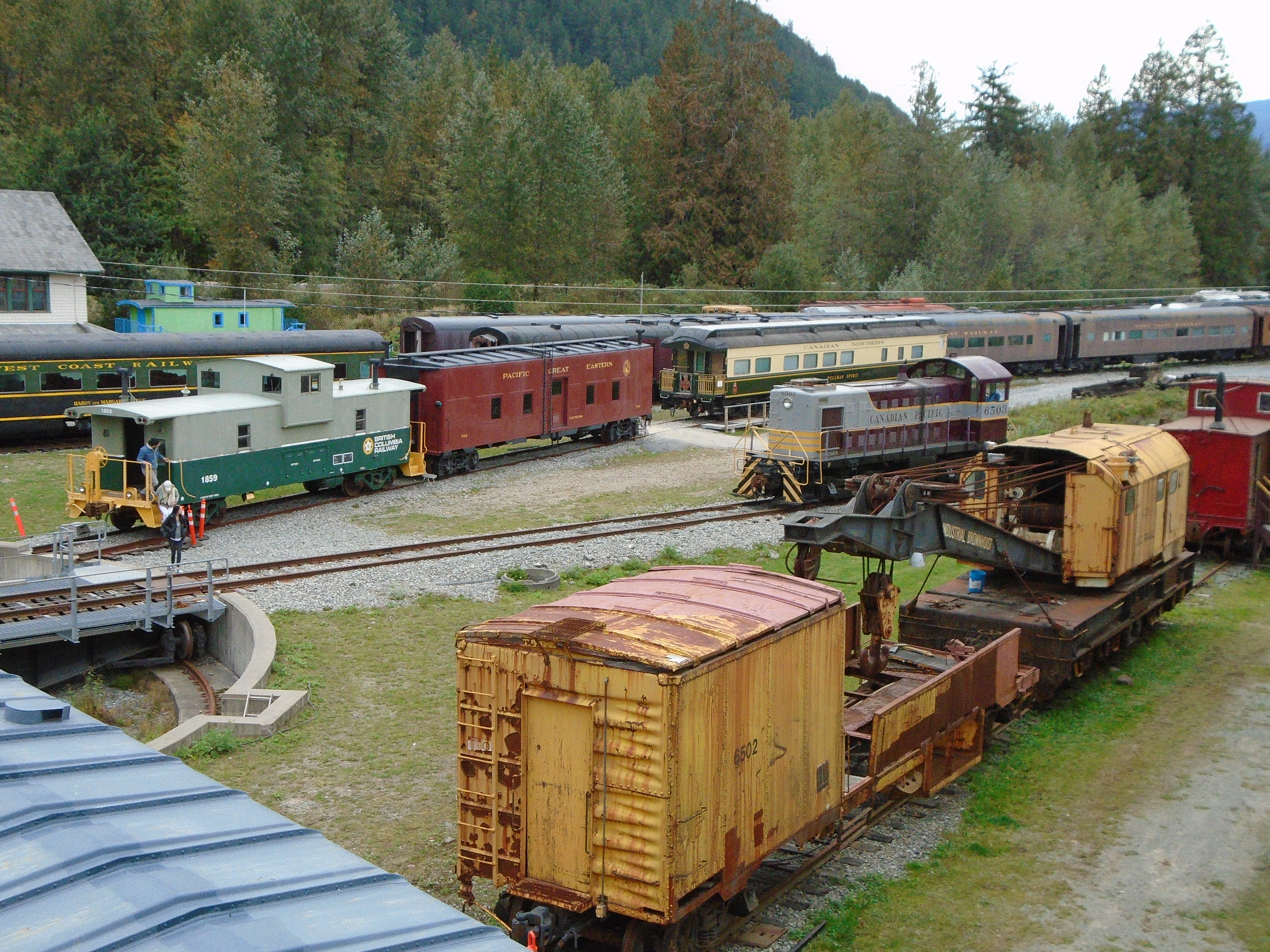
Canadian Pacific No. 6503 with caboose No. 1859, troop sleeper No. 722, business car No. 1910 Pullman Spirit, and other rolling stock

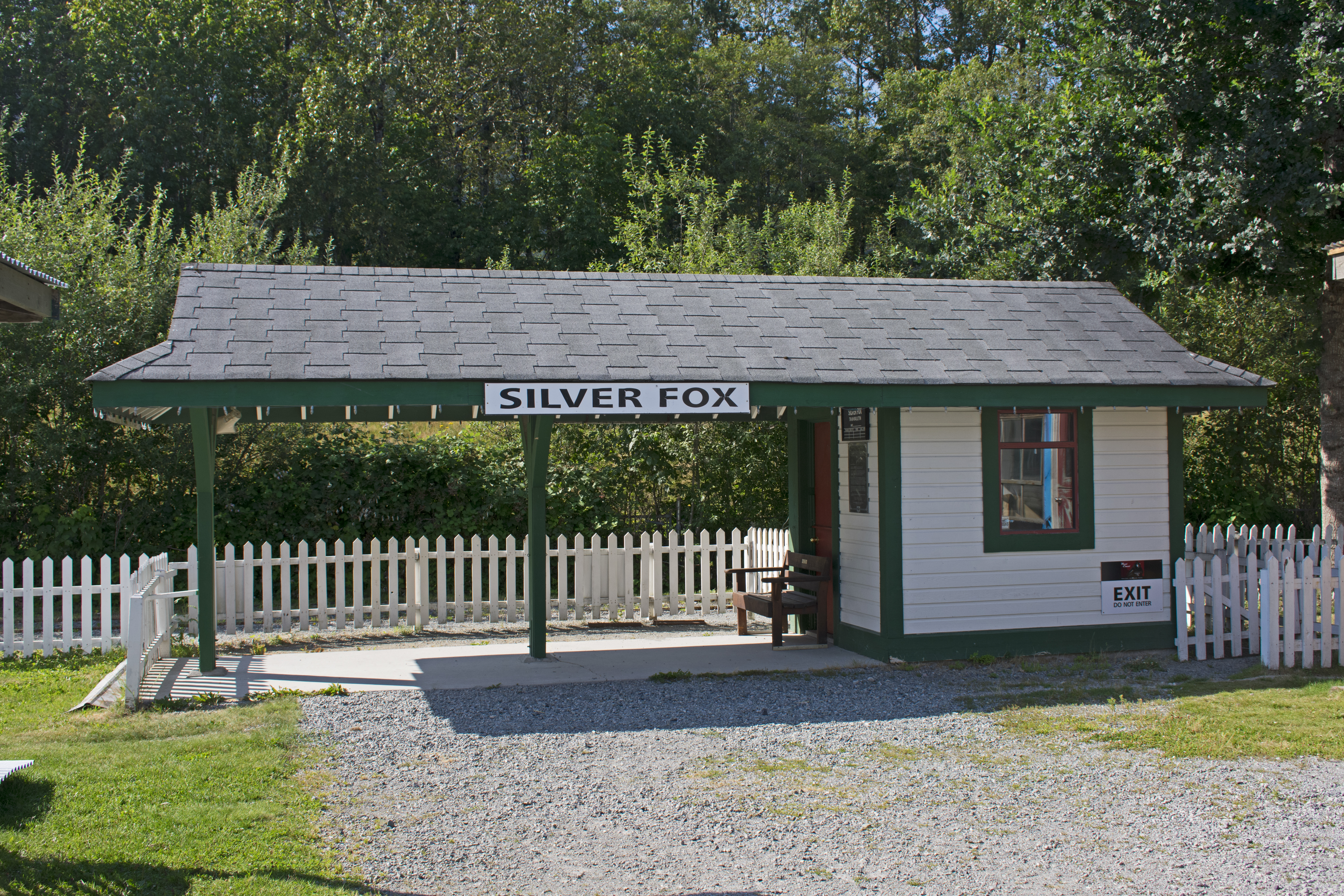
Silver Fox Station, the terminus of the West Coast Mini Rail

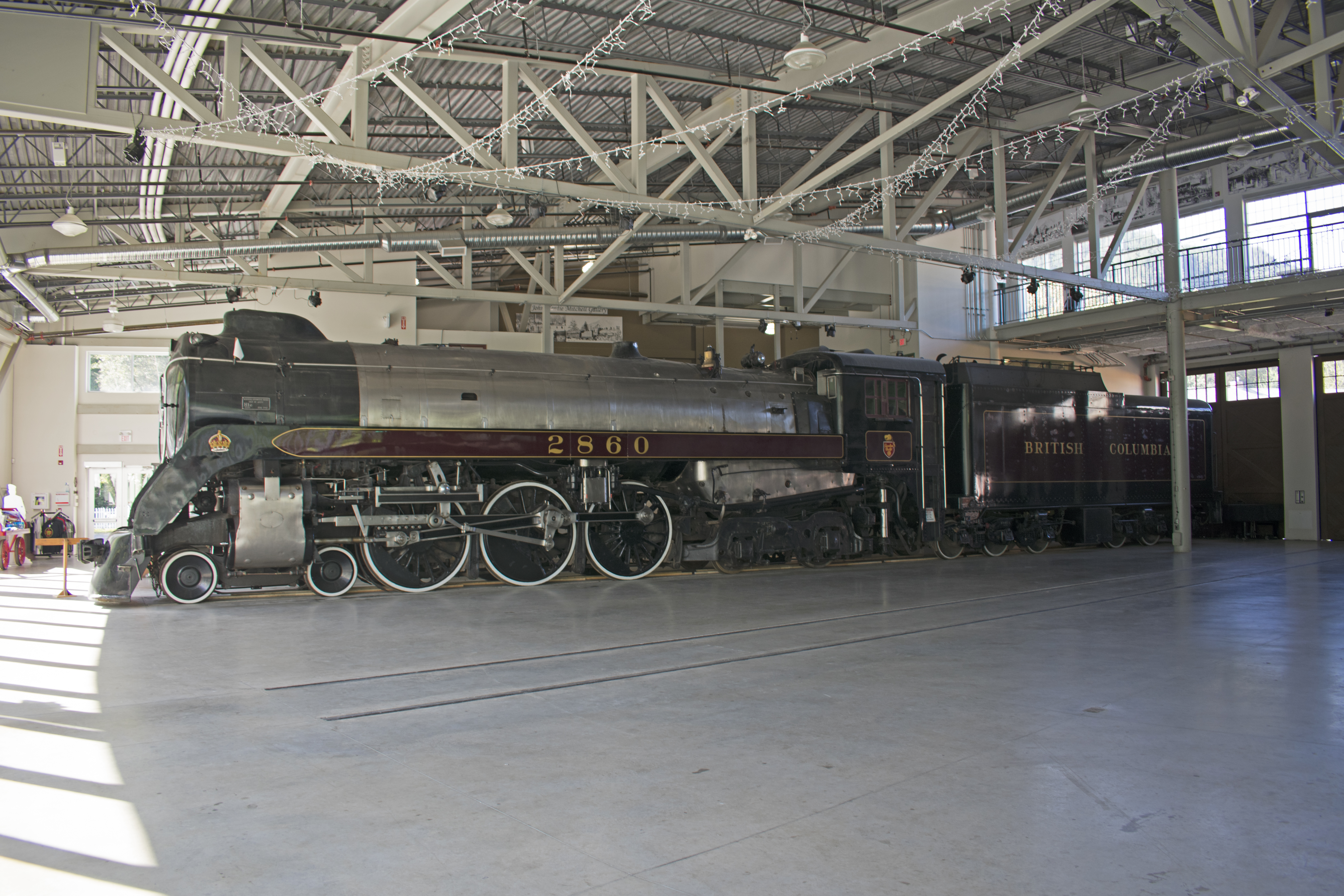
Canadian Pacific No. 2860 on static display inside the CN Roundhouse & Conference Centre on 8 August 2019

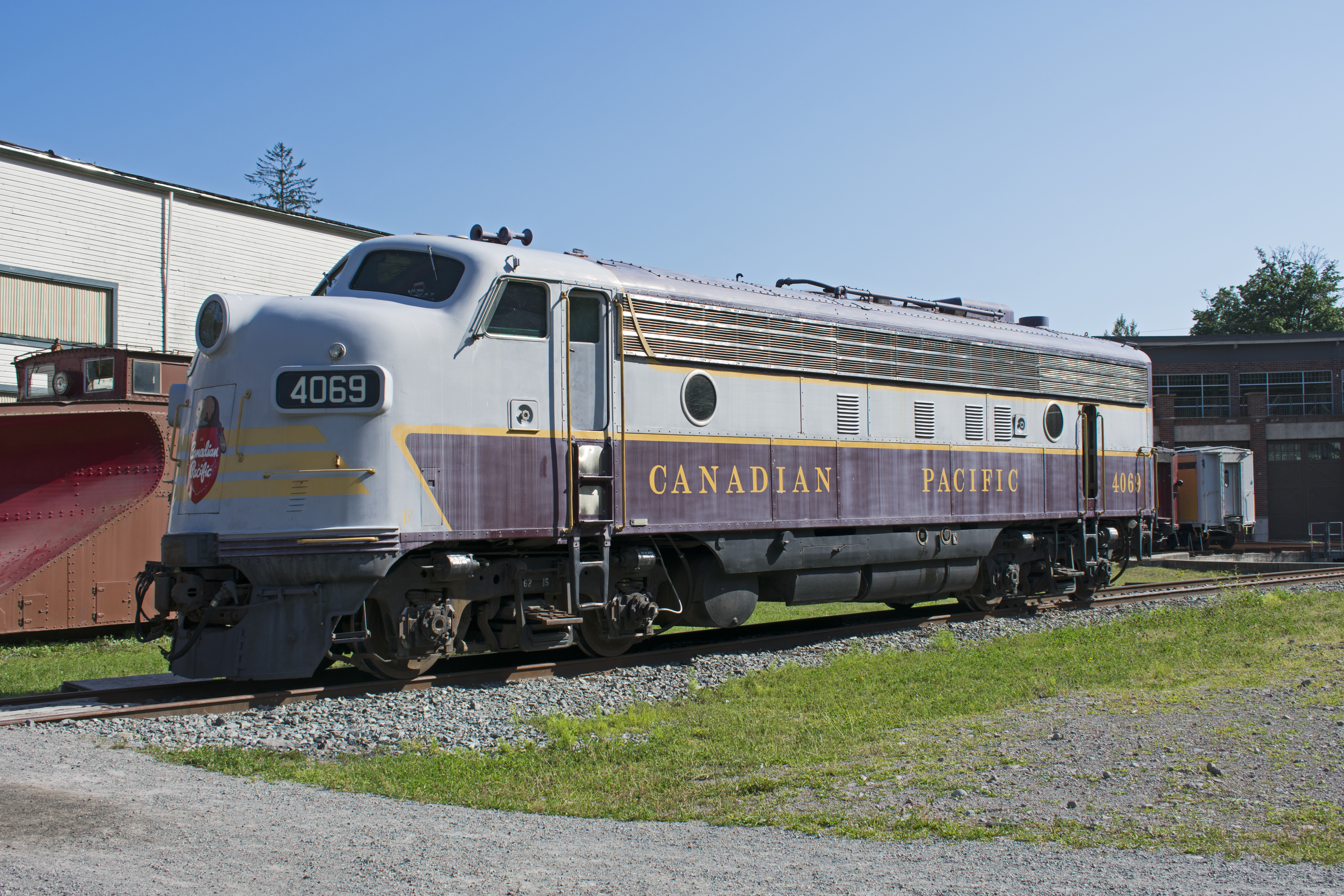
Canadian Pacific No. 4069 idle besides the PGE Car Shop on 8 August 2019

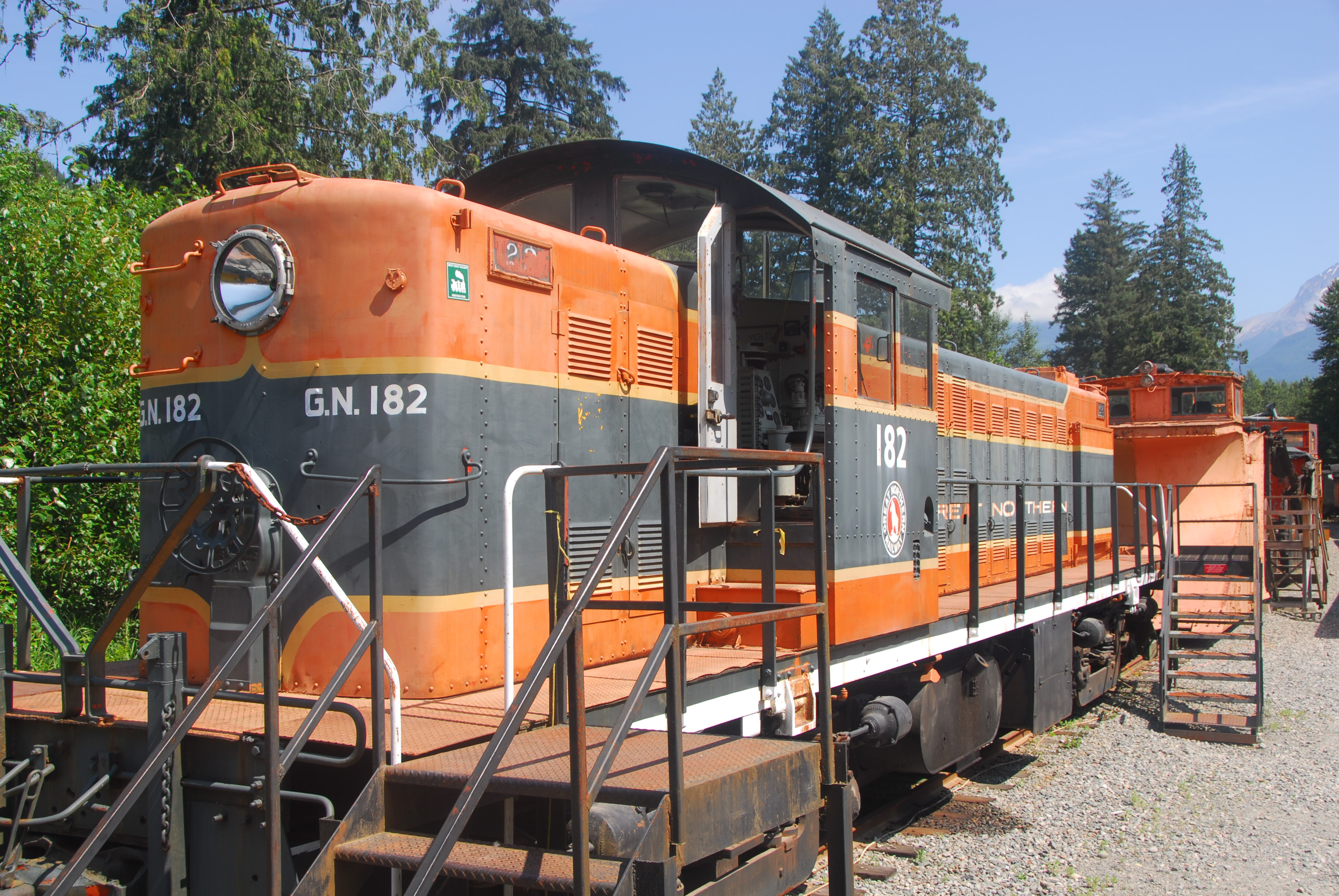
Great Northern No. 182 on display with a snowplow and caboose in the background

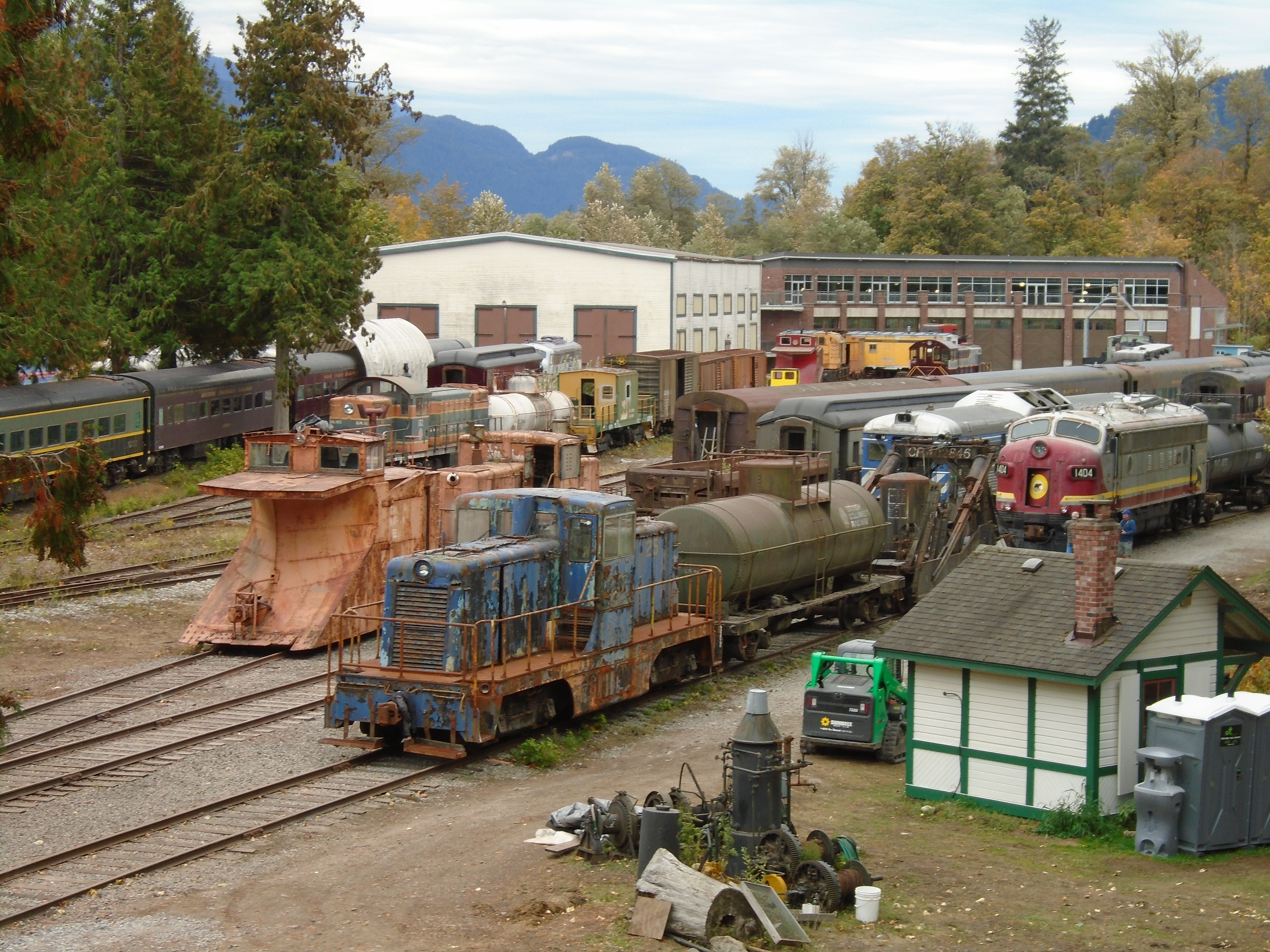
Deteriorating rolling stock alongside the museum's mainline on 29 September 2018

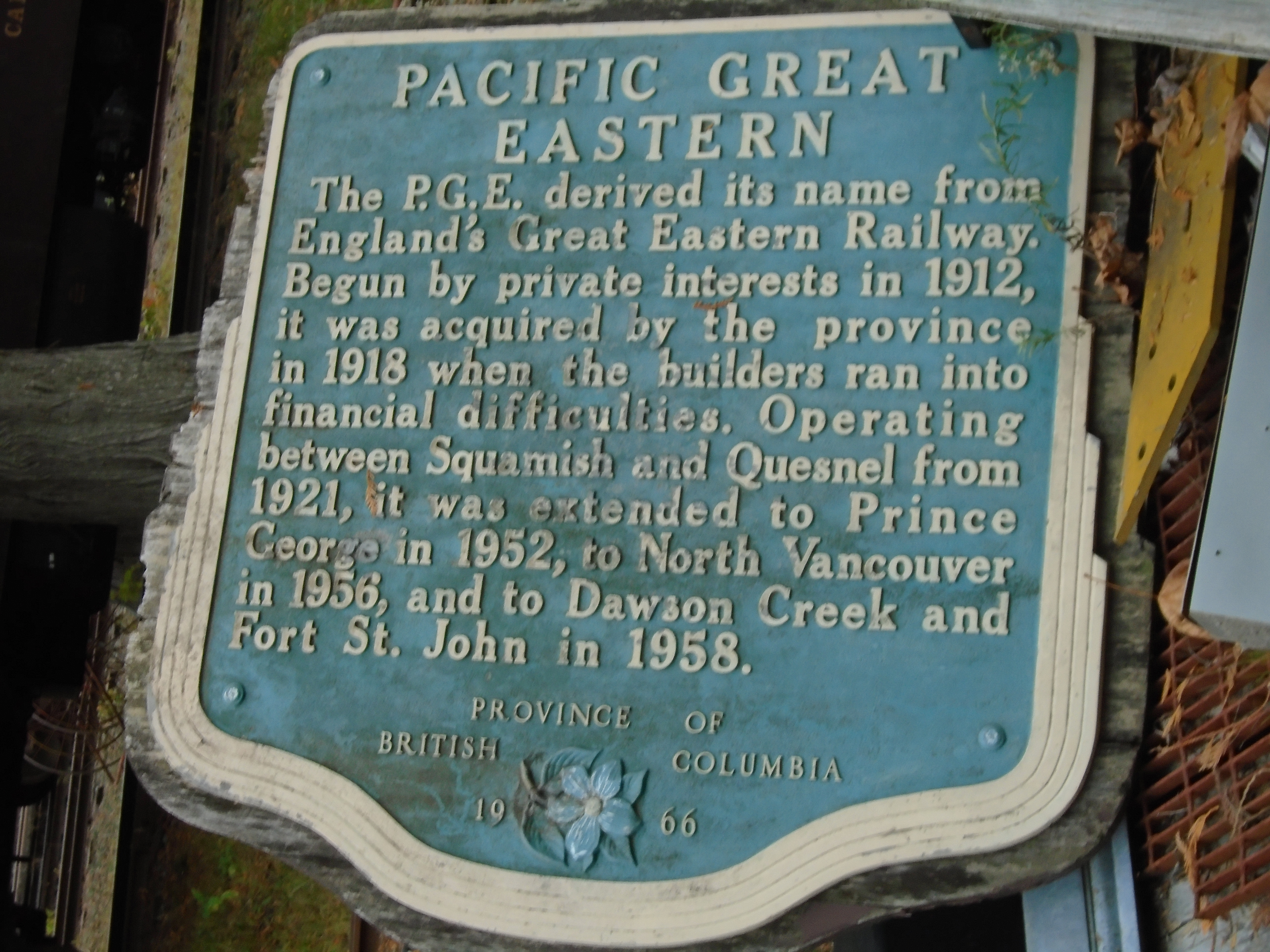
A sign made in 1966 discussing the history of the Pacific Great Eastern Railway

== See also ==
- British Columbia Railway
- Central BC Railway and Forestry Museum
- Kamloops Heritage Railway
- Kettle Valley Steam Railway
- West Coast Railway Association
