= Pacific Great Eastern 2 =

Preserved Canadian steam locomotive

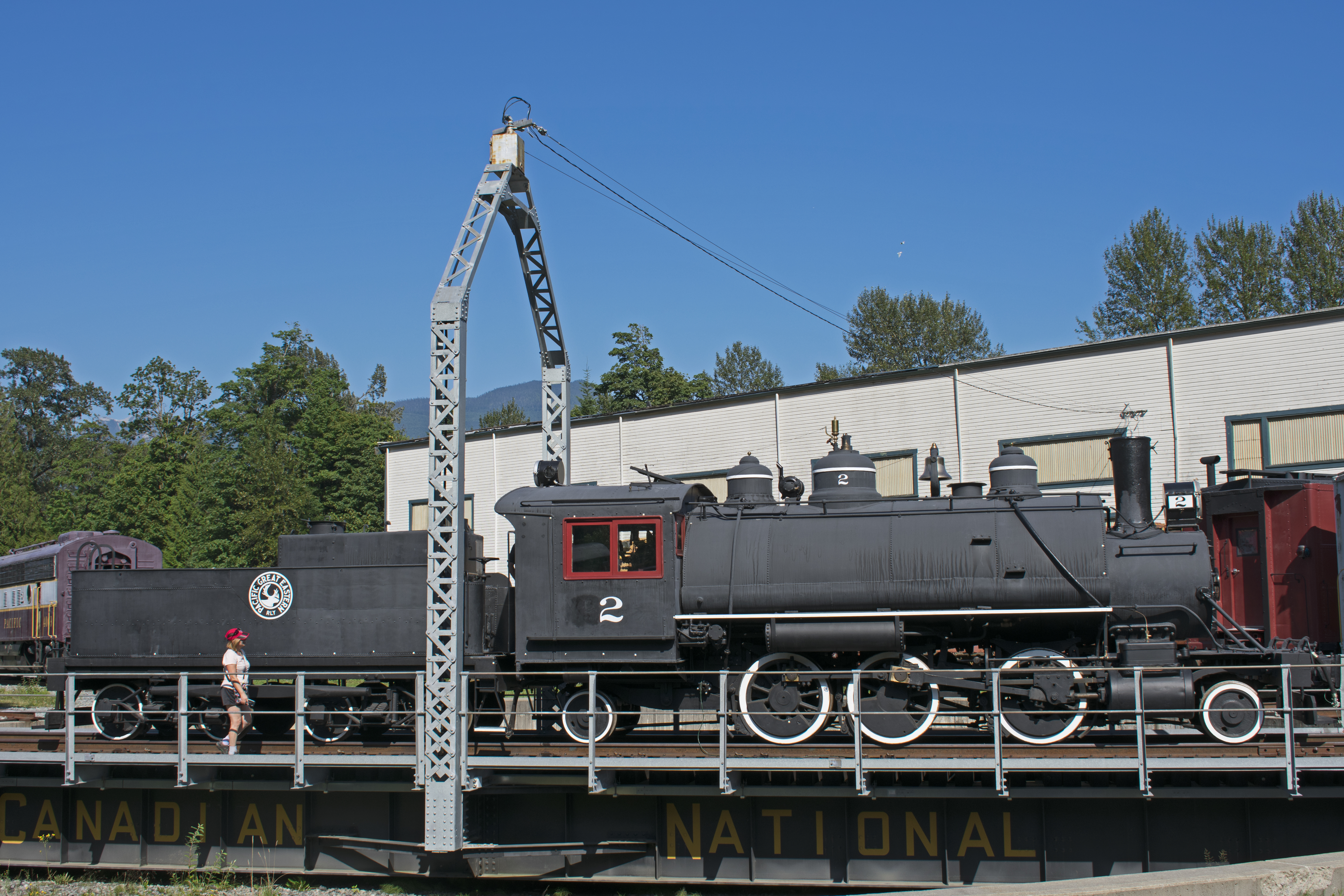
- No. 2 displayed on the turntable at the Railway Museum of British Columbia in August 2019
Type and origin
- Power type: Steam
- Builder: Baldwin Locomotive Works
- Serial number: 34270
- Build date: 1910
Specifications
- Configuration
  - Whyte: 2-6-2
- Gauge: 4 ft 8 1/2 in (1,435 mm)
- Driver dia.: 44 in (1.1 m)
- Adhesive weight: 85,000 lb (39,000 kg)
- Loco weight: 110,000 lb (50 t)
- Fuel type: Oil
- Fuel capacity: 6,275 gal
- Water cap.: 1,600 gal
- Firebox
  - Grate area: 14.4 sq ft (1.34 m^{2})
- Boiler
  - Small tubes: 152 - 2 in (0.051 m)
- Boiler pressure: 185 lbf/in^{2} (1.28 MPa)
- Heating surface
  - Firebox: 90 sq ft (8.4 m^{2})
  - Total surface: 1,161 sq ft (107.9 m^{2})
- Cylinders: Two, outside
- Cylinder size: 16 in × 24 in (410 mm × 610 mm)
- Valve gear: Stephenson
- Couplers: Knuckle
Performance figures
- Tractive effort: 22,000 lbf (97.9 kN)
- Factor of adh.: 4.07
Career
- Operators: Howe Sound, Pemberton Valley and Northern Railway; Pacific Great Eastern Railway; Comox Logging and Railway Company; District of Squamish; Railway Museum of British Columbia
- Nicknames: Two-Spot; Little Sparky; Buddy
- Retired: 1967
- Preserved: 1967
- Current owner: West Coast Railway Association
- Disposition: Static display

Pacific Great Eastern 2 is a preserved 2-6-2ST "Prairie" type steam locomotive built in February 1910 by the Baldwin Locomotive Works for the Howe Sound, Pemberton Valley and Northern Railway and later acquired by its predecessor, the Pacific Great Eastern Railway. After use in the construction of the railway, it was sold to the Comox Logging and Railway Company in 1920 for logging work on Vancouver Island.

The locomotive was retired in 1967 and subsequently sent to the District of Squamish for display at Stan Clarke Park, until 1993 when it was purchased by the West Coast Railway Association. It has since remained in their collection at the Railway Museum of British Columbia.

== History ==
=== Early career ===
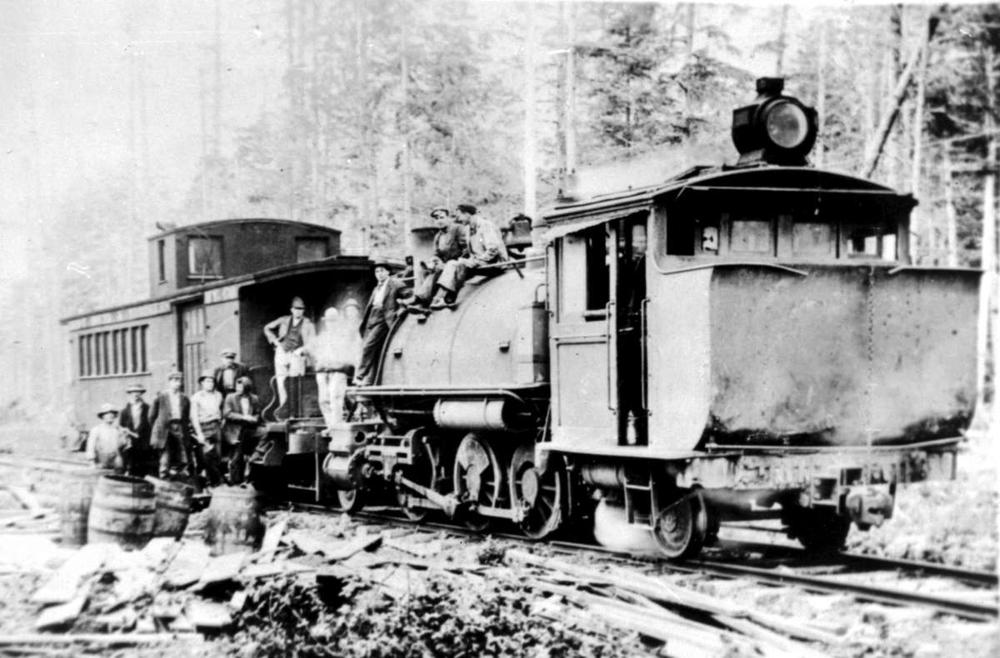
Pacific Great Eastern No. 2 seen north of Squamish with a construction crew in 1912.

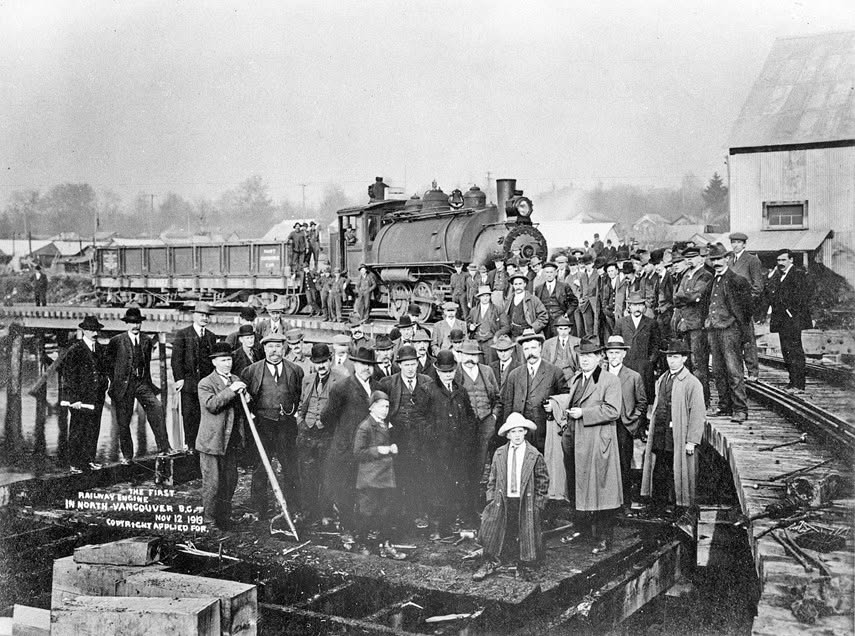
Pacific Great Eastern No. 2 upon arrival in North Vancouver on November 12, 1913, after being brought by barge to begin construction of the North Vancouver subdivision.

No. 2 was built in February 1910 by the Baldwin Locomotive Works as a 2-6-2ST saddle tank locomotive and delivered to the Howe Sound, Pemberton Valley and Northern Railway for logging operations in the Squamish Valley and assistance with line construction. It joined the fleet as the company's second engine, alongside No. 1. Later in 1910, the locomotive was relettered when the title simplified to the Howe Sound and Northern Railway, in an attempt to secure an operating charter and raise capital. Following the incorporation of the Pacific Great Eastern Railway on February 27, 1912, the new company sought to acquire the Howe Sound and Northern line for its northern expansion project. They reached a deal on October 12, 1912, for a purchasing price of CA$1,225,000. No. 2 was transferred to the Pacific Great Eastern on November 9, 1912, and retained its original number.

The locomotive would carry logs from Newport Timber near Mamquam Road in Squamish to the waterfront to be dumped. As development of the railway along the North Shore began, No. 2 was brought by Canadian Pacific barge No. 1 from Squamish to the foot of Chesterfield Avenue on November 12, 1913, becoming the first locomotive to arrive on the original North Shore subdivision. It was used for construction work between North Vancouver and Horseshoe Bay, as its wheel arrangement was most suitable for the necessary work.

==== West Bay accident ====
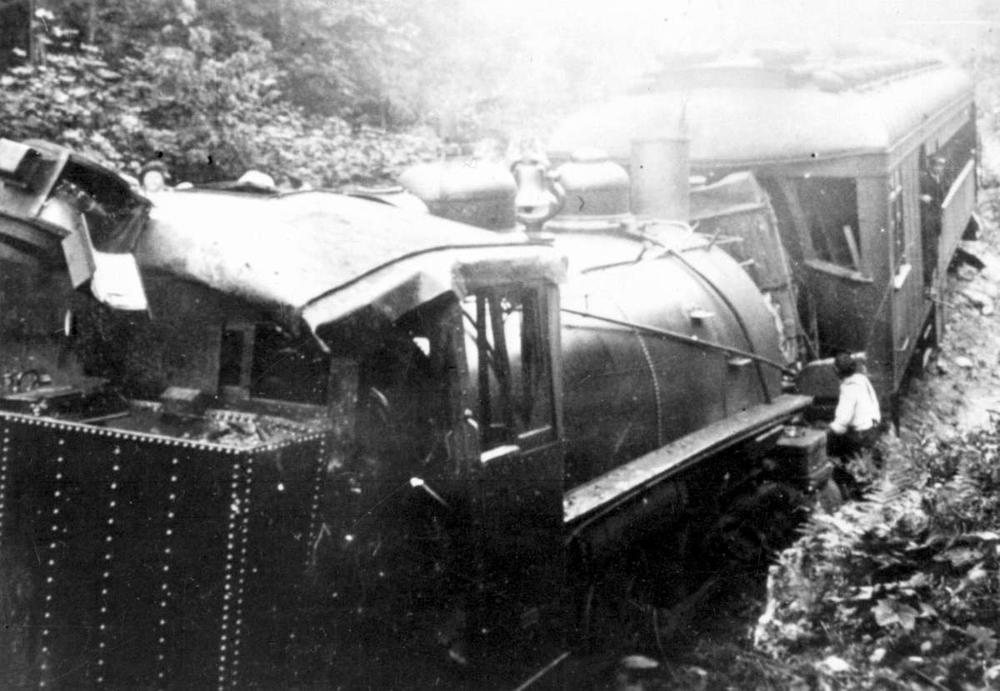
A view of the collision between No. 2 and gas car No. 103 on September 4, 1916.

On September 4, 1916, at 12:55, No. 2 was hauling Train 19, a westbound excursion train of three cars with 250 excursionists heading to Horseshoe Bay, when it collided head-on with eastbound Train 22, consisting of Pacific Great Eastern gas car No. 103 and a boxcar carrying few passengers. The accident resulted from a misunderstanding of train orders as the crew of Train 19, intending to pass Train 22, did not wait for the railcar to arrive at Dundarave, leading to an accident as No. 103 suddenly appeared around a bend. Although No. 2 had nearly halted before impact, the collision heavily damaged the front ends of both locomotives and passengers were thrown from their seats.

The engineer of No. 2 and 19 passengers were injured, seven of whom were taken to the Harbour View Sanitarium. No. 2 underwent an extensive rebuild in the Squamish Shops, while gas car No. 103 was withdrawn from service and later scrapped.

=== Ownership by Comox Logging and Railway ===
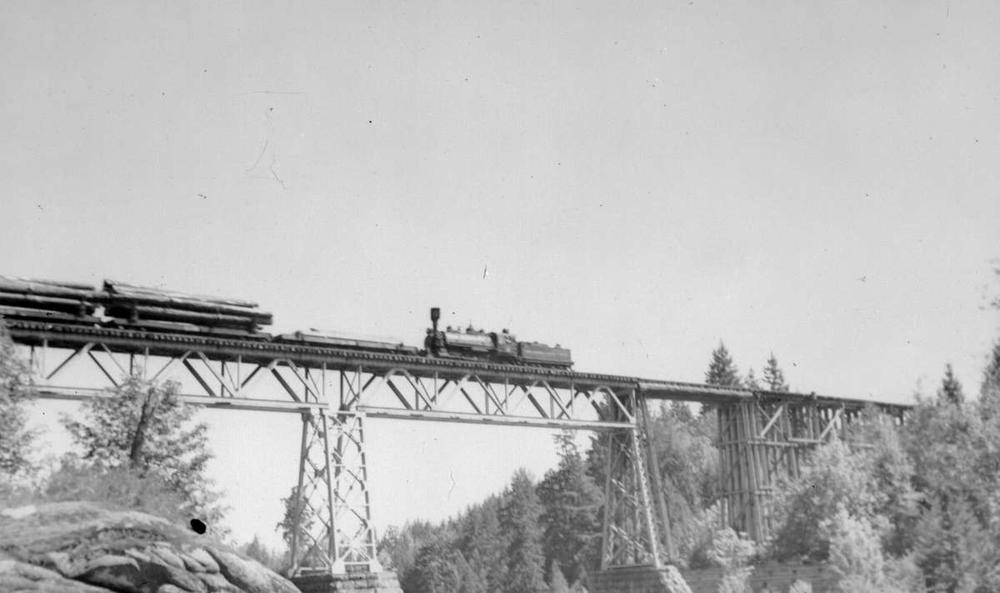
No. 7 hauling logs on the Nanaimo Lakes line of the Comox Logging and Railway Company in the 1950s.

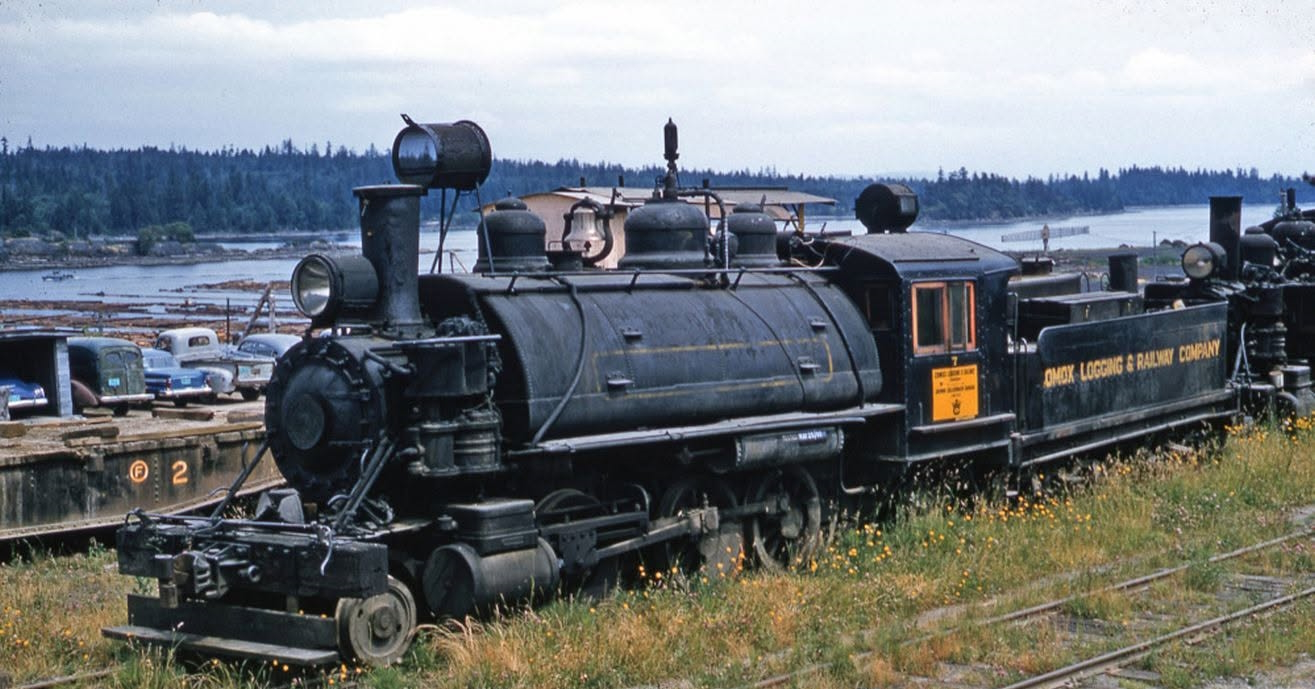
No. 7 idling near the harbour in Ladysmith in 1960, with the Crown Zellerbach name displayed below its cab windows.

In 1920, No. 2 was retired and sold to the Comox Logging and Railway Company on Vancouver Island for CA$17,250. The locomotive, now numbered No. 7, was initially used for logging work in the company headquarters of Comox, along with several other heavy locomotives. During the 1930s, No. 7 was heavily modified for industrial logging work. It was converted to burn oil, with the addition of a small tender to carry a higher capacity of fuel. This replaced the original bunker attached to the cab, which carried a minor amount of oil behind the coal bunker. The locomotive was also given a spark arrestor atop its smokestack, which could be mounted as needed.

The 1940s saw the establishment of the Nanaimo Lakes line and expansion to Ladysmith, where No. 7 was transferred in 1945 for logging operations, particularly near the harbour where the company operated a locomotive maintenance facility and log dump.

In 1954, the Comox Logging and Railway Company was purchased by Crown Zellerbach Canada, and a banner distinguishing the railway as a division of Crown Zellerbach was mounted below the cab window of the locomotive.

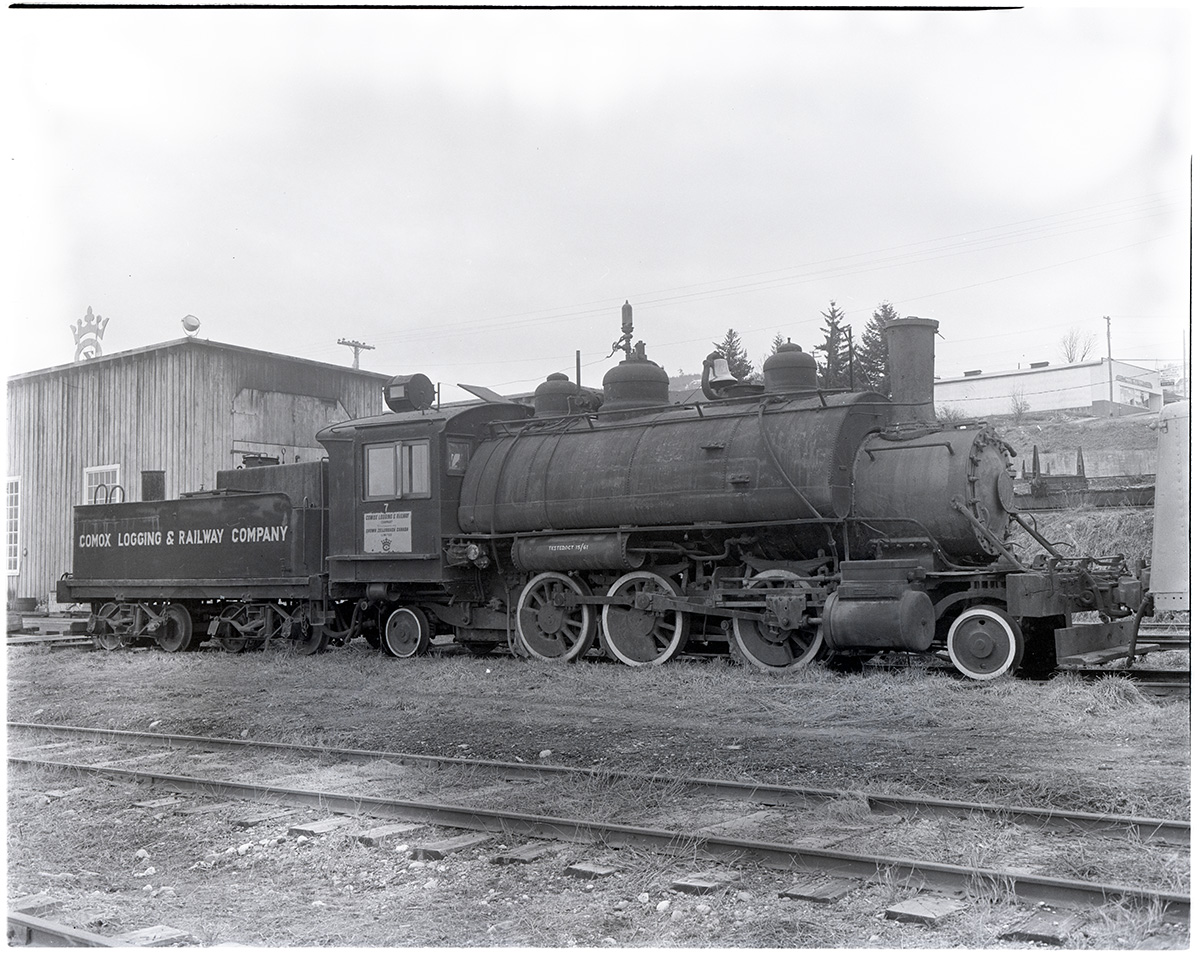
No. 7 being stored in the yards in February 1966 after retirement from revenue service a year prior.

The railway withdrew No. 7 from revenue service in 1965, resulting from the acquisition of modern diesel locomotives and subsequent retirement of the original steam fleet. Following its withdrawal, No. 7 was stored in the Ladysmith rail yards.

=== Preservation ===
Plans to preserve the locomotive developed quickly after its retirement. On April 22, 1967, Crown Zellerbach had No. 7 moved to the Pacific Great Eastern Squamish Shops for a cosmetic restoration by the shop crew, with completion deferred to slack periods of work. Initial plans were for the locomotive to be displayed beside the North Vancouver station, however Squamish requested that it be placed in their town instead. The leisurely restoration period allowed time for locals oliciting, and in October 1967, Crown Zellerbach officially donated the locomotive to the District of Squamish. During its restoration, the locomotive was lettered to the combined name of Pacific Great Eastern and Crown Zellerbach and returned to its original No. 2. It was originally thought the locomotive would be relettered to the Howe Sound, Pemberton Valley and Northern Railway title.

No. 2 was put on static display on November 2, 1967, at Stan Clarke Park along Cleveland Avenue in Downtown Squamish, with a presentation ceremony and speech by Premier W. A. C. Bennett. It became a popular attraction for passengers arriving from the regular Royal Hudson excursion service. A fence was later placed around the locomotive to deter climbing.

By 1993, the West Coast Railway Association was constructing the nearby West Coast Railway Heritage Park and sought to expand their rolling stock collection, with No. 2 being identified as a potential steam centerpiece. In April 1993, the association purchased the locomotive and had it moved to the museum site. If inspections had revealed the boiler was in good condition and no repairs were needed, the association intended to restore No. 2 to operational status, however this never came into fruition.

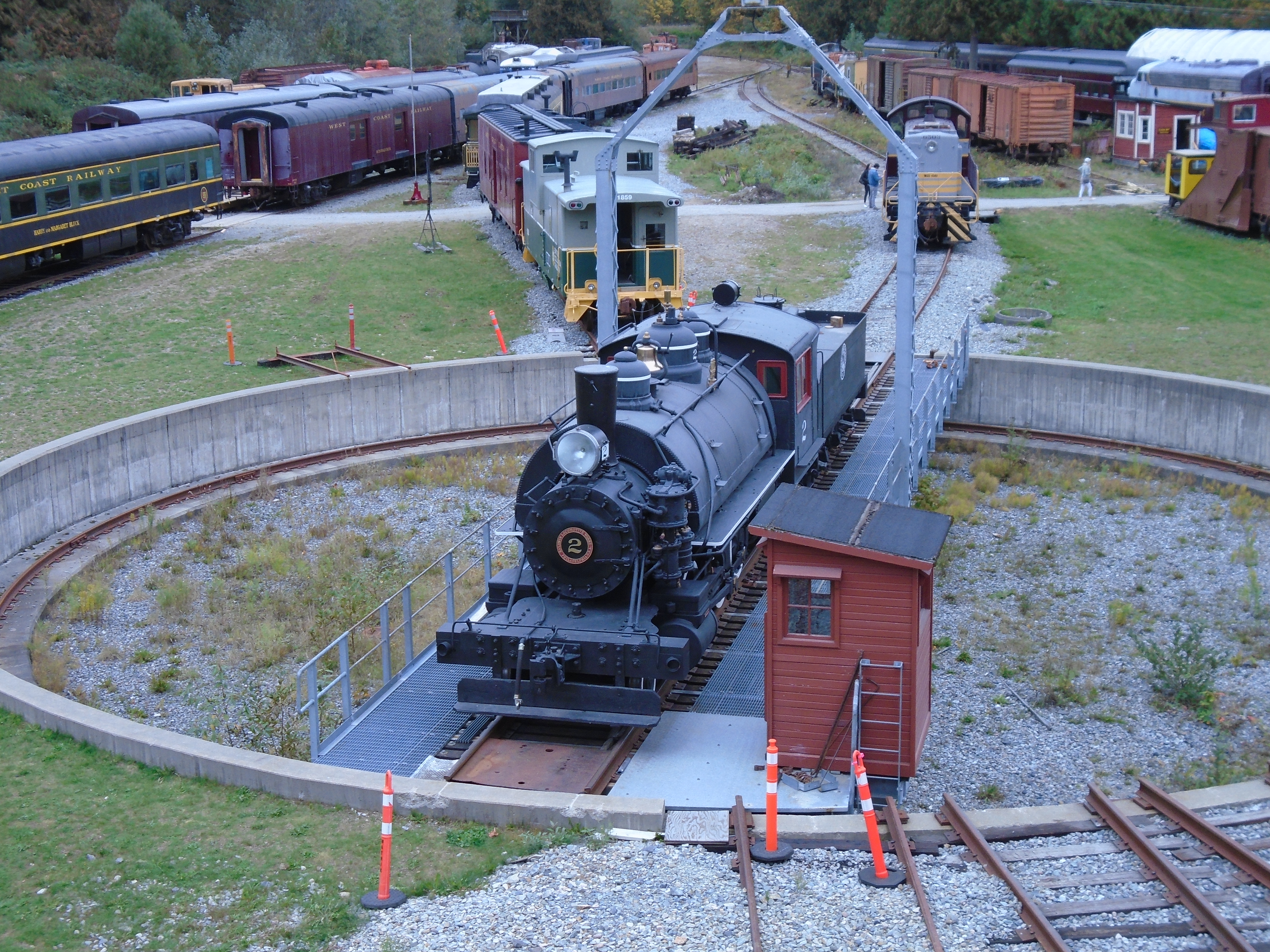
No. 2, now cosmetically restored to its 1910 appearance, displayed on the turntable of the Railway Museum of British Columbia in Squamish in September 2018.

Since its arrival at the museum, the locomotive was due for a cosmetic restoration to its original 1910 appearance. Beginning in 2013, a group of association volunteers known as the Squamish Gang, many of whom being former British Columbia Railway employees, embarked on restoring the locomotive. During the project, it was discovered that the running gear had froze and several mechanical parts were excessively worn, requiring some to be recast. The locomotive also gained the nickname Little Sparky during the restoration. On May 14, 2016, at 14:00, No. 2 debuted at the Mac Norris Station in the museum grounds, later being moved to Track 6 inside the CN Roundhouse and Conference Centre beside Canadian Pacific No. 2860.

No. 2 became the namesake for the Buddy and Friends Children's Festival under the nickname Buddy, after the annual Day Out with Thomas event was cancelled due to licensing costs. For the event, decorative eyes were temporarily affixed to the smokebox door. While No. 2 retains the nickname, its use is primarily restricted to the festival. The locomotive remains on static display as the only preserved 2-6-2ST locomotive in Canada, as well as the only preserved Pacific Great Eastern steam locomotive, excluding No. 53 and No. 56 which are sunken in Seton Lake and Anderson Lake, respectively.

== See also ==
- Canadian Pacific 374
- MacMillan Bloedel & Powell River Ltd. 1077
- Canadian Pacific 2860
- Pacific Great Eastern Railway
