= West Coast Rail =

West Coast Rail may refer to:

- Avanti West Coast
- West Coast Railway (Victoria)
- West Coast Railway Association
- West Coast Railways
