= Canadian Pacific 374 =

Preserved CPR 4-4-0 locomotive

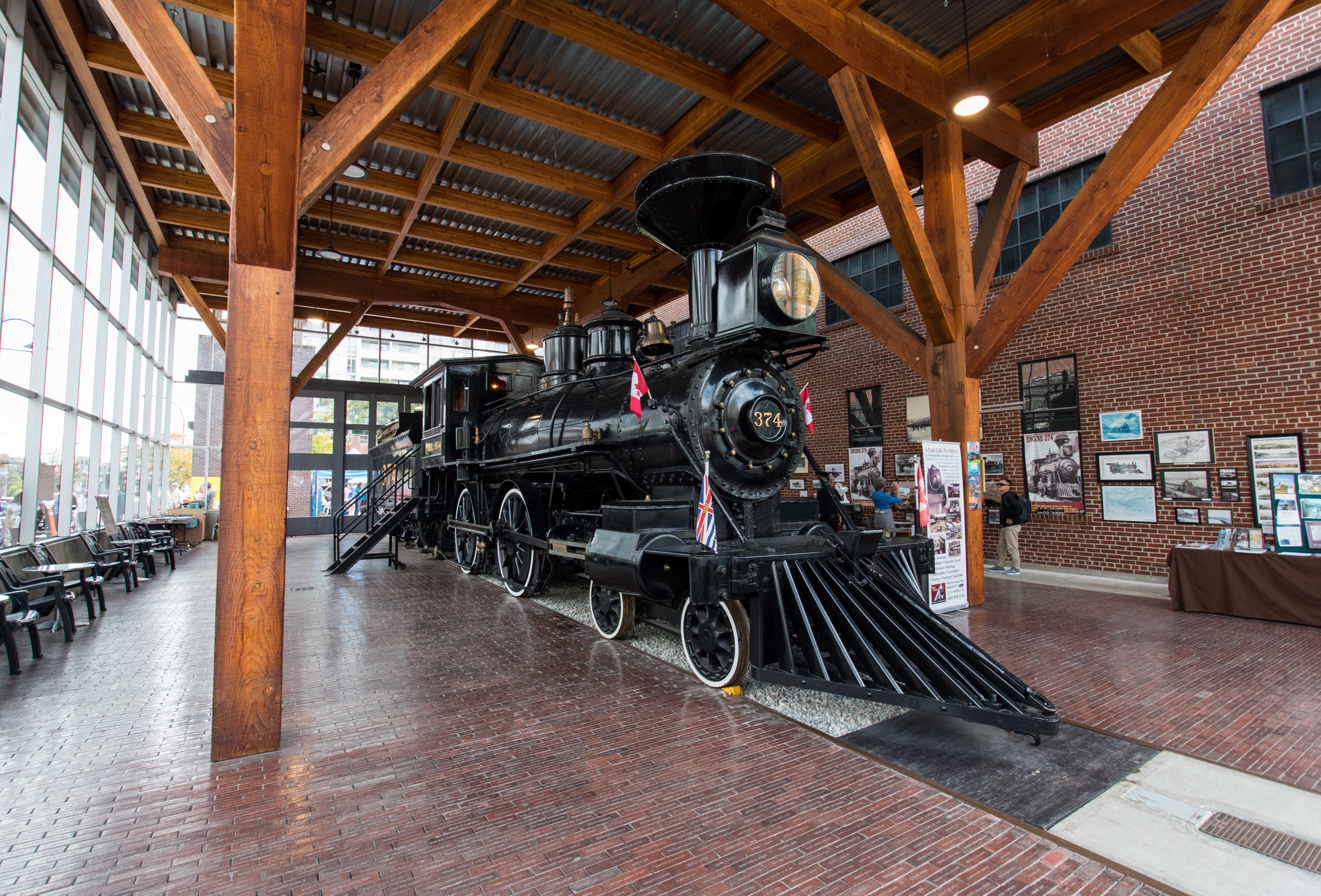
- No. 374 inside the Engine 374 Pavilion
Type and origin
- Power type: Steam
- Builder: Canadian Pacific Railway
- Serial number: 1038
- Build date: May 1886
Specifications
- Configuration
  - Whyte: 4-4-0
  - UIC: 2′B
- Gauge: 4 ft 8 1/2 in (1,435 mm) standard gauge
- Driver dia.: 63 in (1,600 mm)
- Adhesive weight: 71,000 lb (32 t)
- Loco weight: 115,000 lb (52 t)
- Fuel type: Wood
- Boiler pressure: 160 psi (1.1 MPa)
- Cylinders: Two, outside
- Cylinder size: 17 in × 24 in (430 mm × 610 mm)
Performance figures
- Tractive effort: 15,000 lbf (67 kN)
- Factor of adh.: 4.73
Career
- Operators: Canadian Pacific Railway
- Numbers: CP 374; CP 92; CP 245; CP 158
- Retired: July 1945
- Restored: 1986 (cosmetically)
- Disposition: On static display in Yaletown's Engine 374 Pavilion 49.2737529°N 123.1213841°W

Canadian Pacific 374 is a 4-4-0 "American" type steam locomotive that operated on the Canadian Pacific Railway (CPR). It pulled the first transcontinental passenger train to arrive in Vancouver, arriving on May 23, 1887. This was a year after sister Engine No. 371 brought the first train to cross Canada into Port Moody, roughly 20 miles (32 km) to the east.

== History ==
No. 374 was built by the CPR in 1886 and was one of eight similar steam locomotives built that year in their Montreal shops. While No. 371 was scrapped in 1915, No. 374 was completely rebuilt in 1914 and continued in service until 1945. Because of its historical significance, it was donated upon its retirement to the City of Vancouver, which placed it on display in Kitsilano Beach Park. It suffered greatly from exposure to the elements and a lack of upkeep. It remained there until 1983, when a group of railway enthusiasts launched an effort to restore the engine in time for Expo 86. It was moved from the beach and spent the next few years in different warehouses around Vancouver while a crew of volunteers undertook the task of restoring the engine. Completed in time for Expo, No. 374 was put on display on the turntable at the renovated former CPR Drake Street Roundhouse in Yaletown where it became a prime attraction.

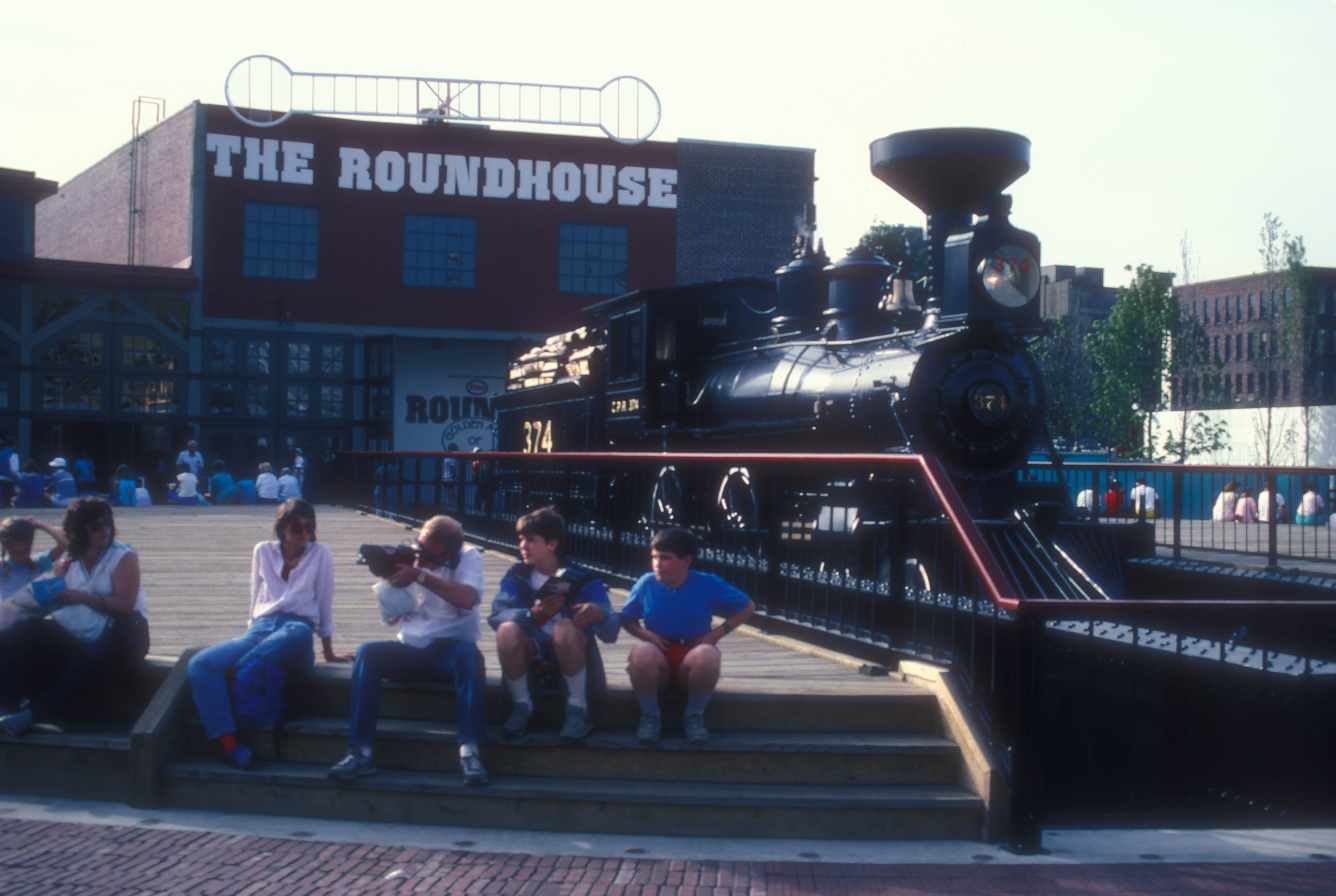
CPR 374 at Expo 86

In 1988 the Expo 86 site, including the Drake Street Roundhouse, was sold to Concord Pacific, and in the course of the False Creek North Development Plan, the developer agreed to convert and expand the buildings to comprise the Roundhouse Community Centre. The Community Centre was designed by Baker McGarva Hart and completed in 1997. The plan for the development had made no mention of the No. 374 and it was temporarily housed inside the roundhouse itself while it was decided what to do with the engine.

Successful fundraising efforts were undertaken by the Vancouver Park Board and the Lions Club, among others, and a year later the new Engine 374 Pavilion was completed.

Now a central feature of the Yaletown area redevelopment, the Engine 374 Pavilion is open daily for public viewing from 10 a.m. to 4 p.m. during the summer and 11 a.m. to 3 p.m. in the winter. An anniversary celebration is held annually on the Sunday before Victoria Day. The pavilion is staffed entirely by volunteers from the West Coast Railway Association and on average sees roughly 41,000 visitors per year as of 2015.
