= Canadian Pacific 1201 =

Preserved locomotive in Ottawa, Ontario

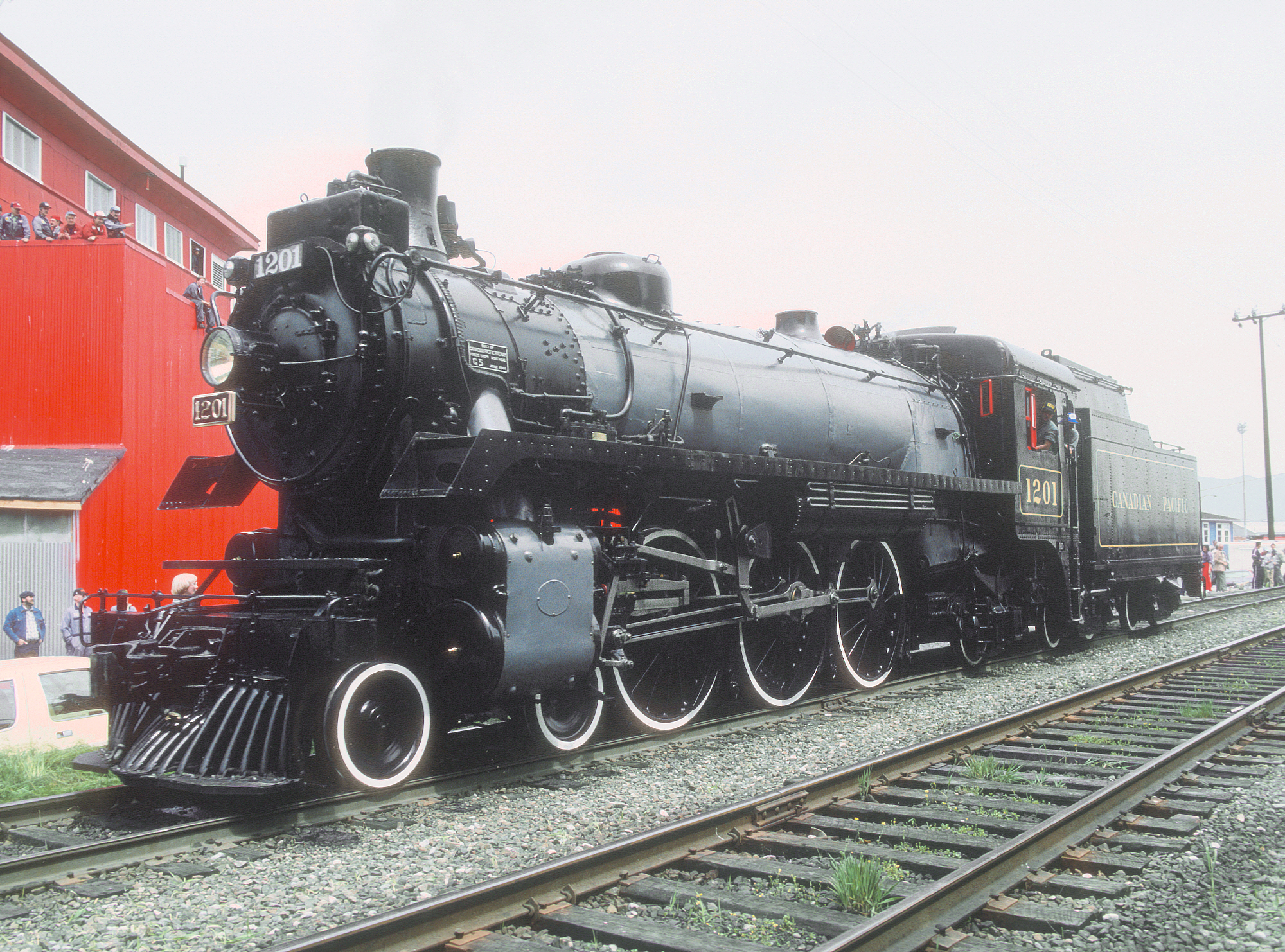
- Canadian Pacific No. 1201 in the Steam Expo locomotive parade at Expo 86.
Type and origin
- Power type: Steam
- Builder: Canadian Pacific Railway Angus Shops
- Serial number: 2074
- Build date: June 1944
Specifications
- Configuration
  - Whyte: 4-6-2
  - UIC: 2′C1′ h2
- Gauge: 4 ft 8 1/2 in (1,435 mm)
- Leading dia.: 33 in (840 mm)
- Driver dia.: 70 in (1,780 mm)
- Trailing dia.: 45 in (1,140 mm)
- Wheelbase
  - Drivers: 15 ft (4.6 m)
- Length: 76 ft 4 1/8 in (23.270 m)
- Height: 14 ft 10 in (4.52 m)
- Axle load: 50,333 lb (22.831 t)
- Adhesive weight: 151,000 lb (68 t)
- Loco weight: 229,500 lb (104.1 t)
- Tender weight: 191,000 lb (87 t)
- Total weight: 420,500 lb (190.7 t)
- Fuel type: New: Coal; Now: Oil
- Fuel capacity: 28,000 lb (13 t)
- Water cap.: 11,529 US gal (43,640 L; 9,600 imp gal)
- Firebox
  - Grate area: 45.6 sq ft (4.24 m^{2})
- Boiler pressure: 250 psi (1.7 MPa)
- Heating surface
  - Firebox: 199 sq ft (18.5 m^{2})
  - Total surface: 3,320 sq ft (308 m^{2})
- Superheater
  - Heating area: 744 sq ft (69.1 m^{2})
- Cylinders: Two, outside
- Cylinder size: 20 in × 28 in (510 mm × 710 mm)
- Valve gear: Walschaerts
- Valve type: Piston valves
- Loco brake: Air
- Train brakes: Air
- Couplers: Knuckle
Performance figures
- Tractive effort: 34,000 lbf (150 kN)
- Factor of adh.: 4.44
Career
- Operators: Canadian Pacific Railway
- Class: G5a
- Number in class: 2 of 2
- Numbers: CPR 1201
- Retired: April 16, 1960 (revenue service); October 1990 (excursion service)
- Preserved: 1966
- Restored: June 6, 1976
- Current owner: Canada Science and Technology Museum
- Disposition: On static display

Canadian Pacific 1201 is a G5a class 4-6-2 "Pacific" type steam locomotive, built in 1944 by the Canadian Pacific Railway's (CP) Angus shops in Montreal, Quebec. It is preserved at the Canada Science and Technology Museum (NMST).

== History ==
No. 1201 was built in June 1944 by the Canadian Pacific Railway's (CP) Angus Shops. It was also the very last steam locomotive built by the CP shops. No. 1201 was used to pull passenger trains across Ontario and Quebec until being retired from revenue service on April 16, 1960. After the Canadian Pacific removed the locomotive from service, the railway put No. 1201 in storage at the Angus Shops yard, and it was donated to the Canada Science and Technology Museum (NMST) six years later in 1966.

In May 1973, No. 1201 was selected to be restored to operating condition to run excursions for the Bytown Railway Society (BRS) over the Gatineau Valley line. It was moved into CP's John Street Roundhouse on June 1, 1973, where restoration officially began by the Ontario Rail Association. During the restoration progress, it was also converted from coal to oil. No. 1201's restoration was completed on June 6, 1976, and moved again under its own power for the first time in sixteen years, doubleheading with Canadian Pacific FP7A No. 4038 on a return trip to Ottawa.

Throughout 1976 and 1985, No. 1201 hauled various passenger excursion trains for the NMST each year, assigned by the Bytown Railway Society. It also hauled a special excursion train to transport Queen Elizabeth II and Prince Philip from Ottawa West through Wakefield on October 16, 1977.

On November 7, 1985, No. 1201 travelled to British Columbia to participate in the 100th anniversary of the Last Spike.

In 1985 and 1986, No. 1201 sat in storage in New Westminster until May 1986, when it travelled to Vancouver, British Columbia, to participate in a ten-day Steam Exposition event as part of Expo 86. In July 1986, it returned home to Ottawa and was placed in storage for an uncertain future.

Throughout 1987 and 1990, the Bytown Railway Society operated No. 1201 on excursion trips to Pembroke, Hawkesburry and Brockville as well as a two-hour roundtrip between Ottawa and Hull.

In June 1989, the engine travelled to Saint John, New Brunswick, to participate in the ceremony of the inauguration of CP's short line between Montreal and Saint John, the Canadian Atlantic Railway.

On September 16, 1990, it hauled the Thousand Islander special to Brockville for the 130th anniversary celebration of the completion of the Brockville Tunnel. On October 14, No. 1201 operated in its final excursion run from Ottawa to Hawksbury and return. It was returned to the Canada Science and Technology Museum and moved into a warehouse for storage. As of 2026, No. 1201 is on static display at the Canada Science and Technology Museum in Ottawa.

== See also ==
- Canadian National 6060 – Preserved CN class U-1-f 4-8-2 locomotive
- Canadian Pacific 2317 – Preserved CP G3c class 4-6-2 locomotive
- Canadian Pacific 2816 – Preserved CP H1b class 4-6-4 locomotive
- Canadian Pacific Railway#Steam locomotives – Class I railway in Canada and the United States
