= Wedge plow =

Train-mounted snow removal plow

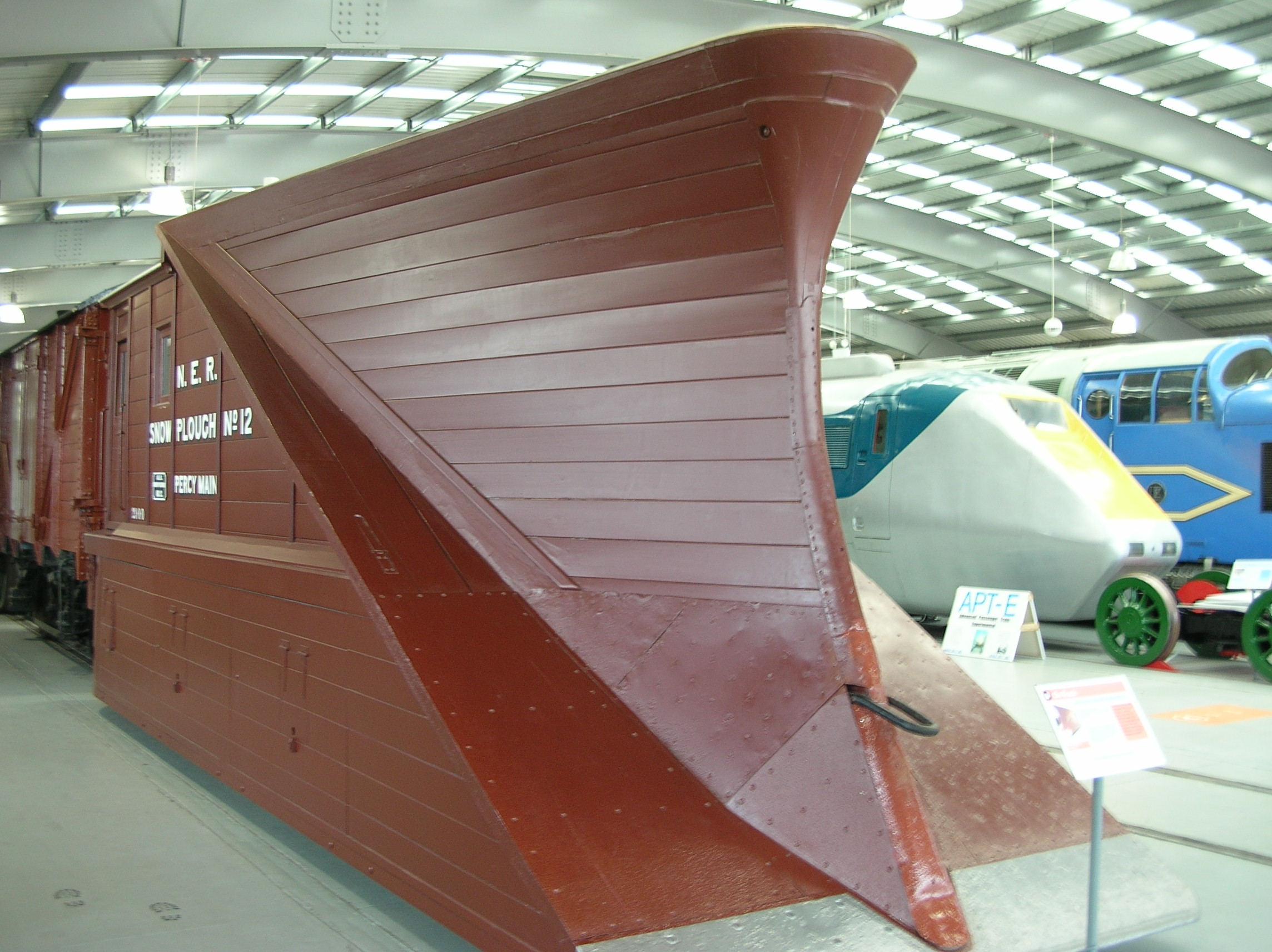
An example of a railroad wedge plow

The wedge plow or bucker plow was first developed by railroad companies to clear snow in the American West. The wedge plow forces snow to the sides of the tracks and therefore requires a large amount of force due to the compression of snow. The wedge plow is still in use today in combination with the high-maintenance rotary snowplow.

== Function ==
Three features are required for optimum performance:

1. The plow has a smooth surface so snow will slide over the plow face rather than accumulating to be pushed along as an increasing mass. Wooden plows were carefully constructed of individually fitted boards and painted frequently to maintain a smooth surface. Steel plows can be sprayed with water in sub-freezing temperatures to form a smooth layer of ice on the plow surface.
2. The plow has a horizontal wedge to lift snow above the level of snow accumulation beside the track. A cutting edge low above the rails usually employed a cast iron or steel leading edge for durability against ice and for weight to discourage the tendency of the wedge to climb over hard-packed snow causing derailment by lifting the wheels off the rails. Under most conditions, the tendency to climb was reduced by weight of snow on the upper side of the wedge, and by downward reaction force accompanying upward acceleration of lifted snow. However, this downward snow loading may be absent when a plow first strikes a snow drift or packed snow face where the plow train has previously stalled. Before making a running start against such conditions, prudent crews would dig into the lower edge of the drift or snow face creating a notch to receive and guide the leading edge of the horizontal wedge.
3. The plow has a vertical wedge to push the snow horizontally away from the track. The vertical wedge may be less acute than the horizontal wedge, but often included a cast or sheet metal cutting edge on wooden plows. Pushing snow horizontally off the track may create an unbalanced horizontal force where asymmetrical snow accumulation is encountered. (such as snow drifting into one side of a cut) This unbalanced force may derail the plow. The leading edge of the horizontal wedge is typically forward of the vertical wedge so stabilizing downward snow loading precedes horizontal loads.

Well-designed wedge plows work best at speeds which accelerate the snow first upward and transitioning to a horizontal acceleration casting the snow far enough from the track to avoid creating high, vertical snowbanks which would leave the cleared track a sheltered deposition site for wind-blown snow.

== History ==
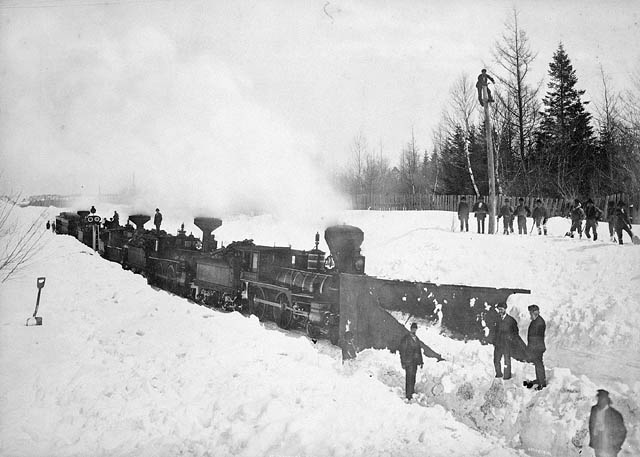
Four locomotives plow deep snow in February, 1869.

Early roads were often rolled rather than plowed to compact accumulated snow into a surface suitable for sleighs drawn by draft animals. Rail transportation brought the requirement for snow removal by plows. In the 1840s railway companies began using Bucker plows to remove snow from railways. The first incarnation of the wedge plow was the Bucker plow which was made of wood. Because of the amount of capital invested in railroads, the railways were required to be functional year-round. Because of this, snow needed to be cleared from the railways in an efficient manner. The wedge plow was patented by Charles Lowbaert to keep railways functional during the winter.

The wedge plow typically required several locomotives to propel the plow with enough force to push through the snow. High speeds of up to 50 mph (80 km/h) were required to achieve an adequate propulsion for the removal of snow. Sometimes, as many as 14 locomotives were used in the process. In the case where snow was tightly packed or frozen, manual labor might still be used to clear the tracks. The process of 'ramming' through snow was accounted by historically as follows.

"The pushing and backing of the engines made a din unequalled since the blacksmithy of the Cyclops. By some hocus pocus the seven engines were made to pull togethers. After three hours of toil-there was a tremendous jerk, a forward movement of a few moments and we were abreast of the station."

Henry David Thoreau also noted in his poems the "steady and cheerful valor of the men who inhabit the snow-plough for their winter quarters...and [to] behold the ploughmen covered with snow and rime, their heads peering above the mould-board."

Plowing was therefore a dangerous job with the chance of derailing the train in the process. Wedge plows are still currently used by railways as a less expensive method for clearing snow drifts from the tracks. During heavier snow conditions, rotary snowplows are used.

== Preservation ==
Preserved wedge plows
Railroad	Number	Years of service	Location	Notes	Photograph
CN	55208	1924–?	Northern Ontario Railroad Museum and Heritage Centre; Capreol, Ontario	The car was originally built in 1924 by the Eastern Car Company (Trenton, Nova Scotia). This snow plow is a single track wedge plow with wings. It is operated by compressed air from the brake system with wings that are air operated.	
CN	55229	1927–?	Saskatchewan Railway Museum; Saskatoon, Saskatchewan		
CN	55351	1928–?	Rocky Mountain Rail Society; Big Valley, Alberta	Acquired 2006.	
CN	55363	1929–?	Owned by Josh Guerney; Fort Frances, Ontario	Located in the grassland just west of the CN Fort Frances station.	
CN	55400	1935–?	Railway Museum of Eastern Ontario; Smith's Falls, Ontario		
CN	55499	1939–?	Kamloops Heritage Museum; Kamloops, British Columbia		
CN	55698	?	New Brunswick Railway Museum; Hillsborough, New Brunswick	Double-ended plough	
CN	56471	?	New Brunswick Railway Museum; Hillsborough, New Brunswick	Built from box car ex-CNR 413949	
CP	400657	1913-?	Saskatchewan Railway Museum; Saskatoon, Saskatchewan	Built by CP Angus Shops in Dec. 1913 as CP 300657 and later renumbered to CP 400657.	
CP	400850	c.1920-1929	The Henry Ford; Dearborn, Michigan		
CP	400884	1911–?	Heritage Park Historical Village; Calgary, Alberta	Built by CP Angus Shops in Dec. 1911 as CP 300884 and later renumbered to CP 400884.	
C&PA	n/a	c.1890–1964?	Railroad Museum of Pennsylvania; Strasburg, Pennsylvania		
NER	12	1891–?	National Railway Museum Shildon; Shildon, England	Acquired 1978.	
PGE	6002	1957–?	Railway Museum of British Columbia; Squamish, British Columbia		
PGE	6003	1956–?	Railway Museum of British Columbia; Squamish, British Columbia		
SPB	X-103	?	Wilderswil railway station Wilderswil, Switzerland		
UP	900002		Western Pacific Railroad Museum; Portola, California	Built February 1949; converted from tender for 3562.	

== See also ==
- Pilot (locomotive attachment) (cowcatcher)
- Rotary snowplow
- Snowplow
- Transcontinental railroad
