= Baldwin DRS-4-4-1000 =

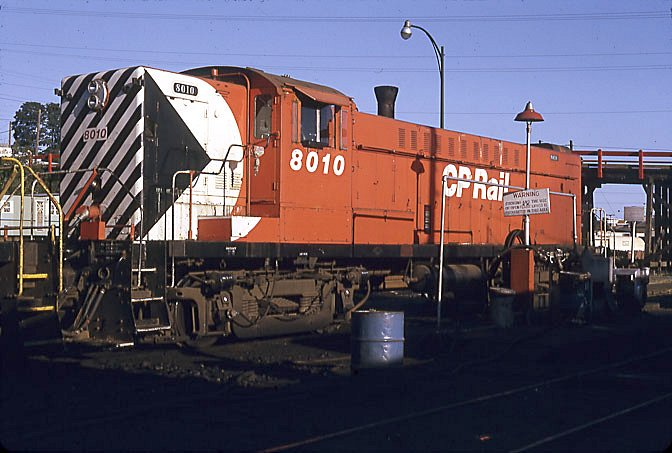
- Canadian Pacific Railway #8010.
Type and origin
- Power type: Diesel-electric
- Builder: Baldwin Locomotive Works
- Model: DRS-4-4-1000
- Build date: July 1948–March 1950
- Total produced: 22
Specifications
- Configuration
  - AAR: B-B
- Gauge: 4 ft 8 1/2 in (1,435 mm) standard gauge
- Prime mover: 606SC
- RPM range: 625 rpm maximum
- Engine type: Straight-6 Four-stroke diesel
- Aspiration: Turbocharger Elliott Company BF34 (125 hp)
- Displacement: 1,979 cu in (32.43 L) per cylinder 11,874 cu in (194.58 L) total
- Generator: Westinghouse YG42A
- Traction motors: Westinghouse 340F (4)
- Cylinders: 6
- Cylinder size: 12 3/4 in × 15 1/2 in (324 mm × 394 mm)
- Transmission: Electric
- Loco brake: Straight air
- Train brakes: Air
Performance figures
- Power output: 1,000 hp (750 kW)
Career
- Operators: Pennsylvania Railroad, Esquimalt and Nanaimo, Penn Central
- Locale: North America
- Disposition: 1 preserved, remainder scrapped

The Baldwin DRS-4-4-1000 was a diesel-electric road switcher produced by the Baldwin Locomotive Works from July 1948–March 1950. The units featured a 1,000 horsepower (750 kW), six-cylinder prime mover, and were configured in a B-B wheel arrangement mounted atop a pair of two-axle AAR Type-B road trucks, with all axles powered. They had a cast steel frame. The units were configured to normally run with the long hood in the forward position.

Only 9 were built for American railroads, with another 13 manufactured in December 1948 and January and February 1949 by the Canadian Locomotive Company for the Esquimalt and Nanaimo Railway, the first railroad in Canada to dieselize its locomotive fleet. The DRS-4-4-1000 was (in most cases) visually indistinguishable from its 1,200 horsepower (890 kW) successor, the RS-12. The only intact example of the DRS-4-4-1000 is Canadian Pacific No. 8000, the first diesel locomotive purchased by the Canadian Pacific Railway, which is currently being cosmetically restored at the Railway Museum of British Columbia in Squamish.

== Units produced by Baldwin Locomotive Works (1948–1950) ==
Railroad	Quantity	Road numbers	notes
Pennsylvania Railroad	6	5591–5594, 9276, 9277	To Penn Central as #8300-8305 in 1968.
Tennessee Central Railway	3	75–77	

== Units produced by the Canadian Locomotive Company (1948–1949) ==
Image	Railroad	Quantity	Road numbers
	Canadian Pacific Railway	13	#8000–8012 worked the Esquimalt and Nanaimo Railway).

== Preservation ==
• Canadian Pacific #8000 is preserved at the Railway Museum of British Columbia in Squamish, BC.
