= West Coast Railway Association =

Nonprofit society in British Columbia, Canada

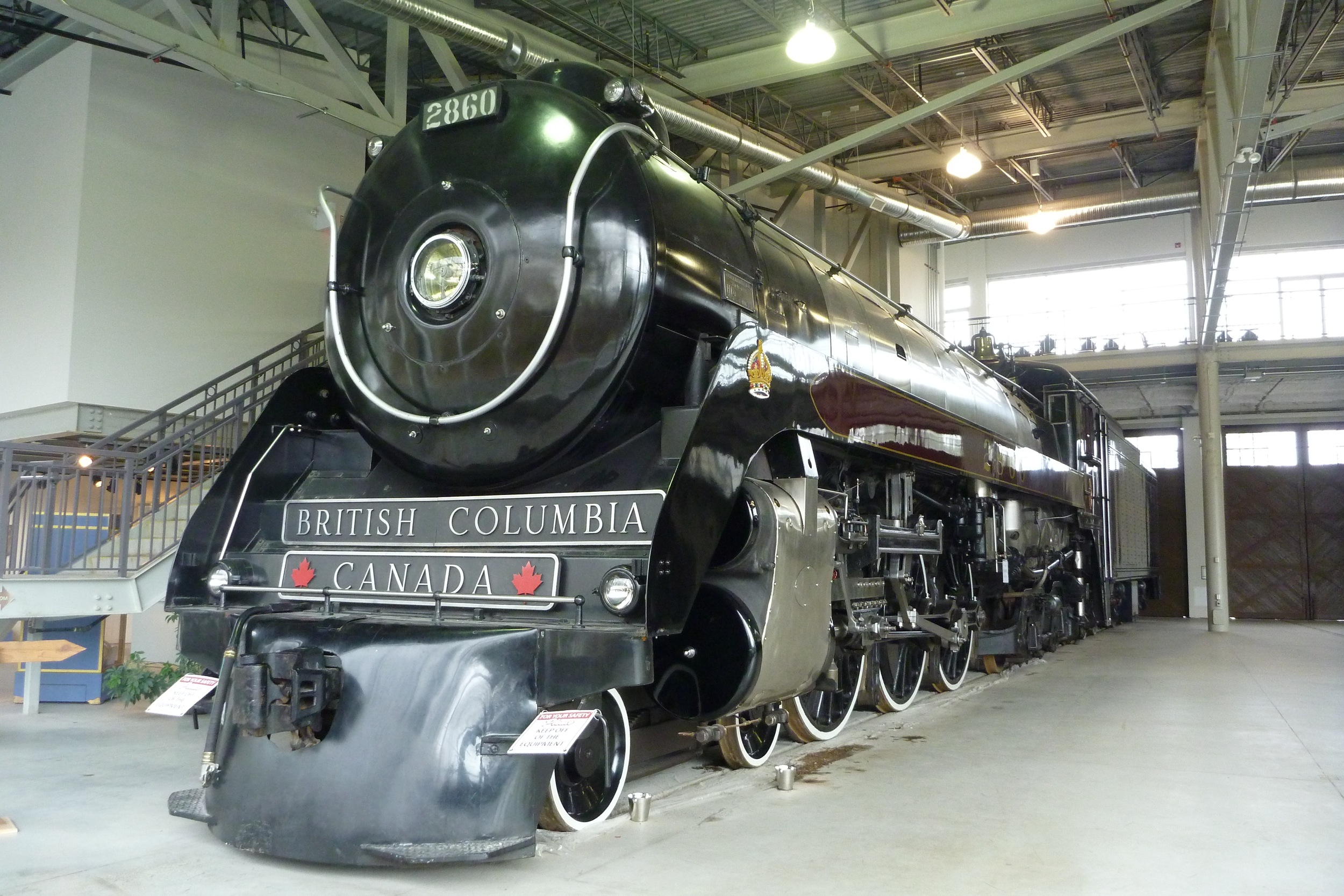
- Royal Hudson no. 2860 inside the CN Roundhouse & Conference Centre
- Abbreviation: WCRA
- Founded: 1961
- Location: Squamish, British Columbia
- Coordinates: 49.70196°N 123.15320°W
- Website: wcra.org

The West Coast Railway Association (WCRA) is a non-profit society founded in 1961. Dedicated to preserving British Columbia's railway heritage, they operate the Railway Museum of British Columbia (formerly West Coast Railway Heritage Park) and the CN Roundhouse & Conference Centre located in Squamish, BC. The museum is home to over 90 pieces of vintage railway equipment and is the second largest railway museum in Canada, while the Conference Centre is a 21,000 sqft event venue.

Notable pieces of the WCRA's collection include 1890s era business car "British Columbia" and 1910 steam locomotive Pacific Great Eastern 2. The association also loans Royal Hudson No. 2860 from the Government of British Columbia for static display.

The park operates several events throughout the year in which train rides are offered. Occasional excursions using WCRA equipment have also travelled throughout the province.

Volunteers from the WCRA also operate the Engine 374 Pavilion in Vancouver, British Columbia.
