= CPR Angus Shops =

Coordinates: 45°32′36″N 73°33′57″W

The CPR Angus Shops in Montreal were a railcar manufacturing, repairing and selling facility of the Canadian Pacific Railway. Production mainly consisted of passenger cars, freight cars and locomotives. Built in 1904 (122 years ago) and named for founder, Richard B. Angus, the Angus Shops were decommissioned in 1992 (34 years ago). The underlying lands were subsequently redeveloped for commercial, industrial and housing usage.

The 1,240-acre (500 ha) site had 66 buildings. More than 12,000 people worked there over the facility's lifetime.

== Wartime manufactures ==
During World War II, Angus Shops produced Valentine tanks for the Red Army under the Lend-Lease program. The first tank was completed on May 22, 1941, and production continued into 1943.

== Redevelopment ==
The City of Montreal acquired the site and submitted the major part to private promoters' urban plan. Redevelopment began and consisted of several phases: building demolition, soil decontamination, and redefinition of the urban infrastructure of the Rosemont neighbourhood. Redevelopment took place between 1993 and 2000 at a cost of nearly $500 million.

== Gallery ==
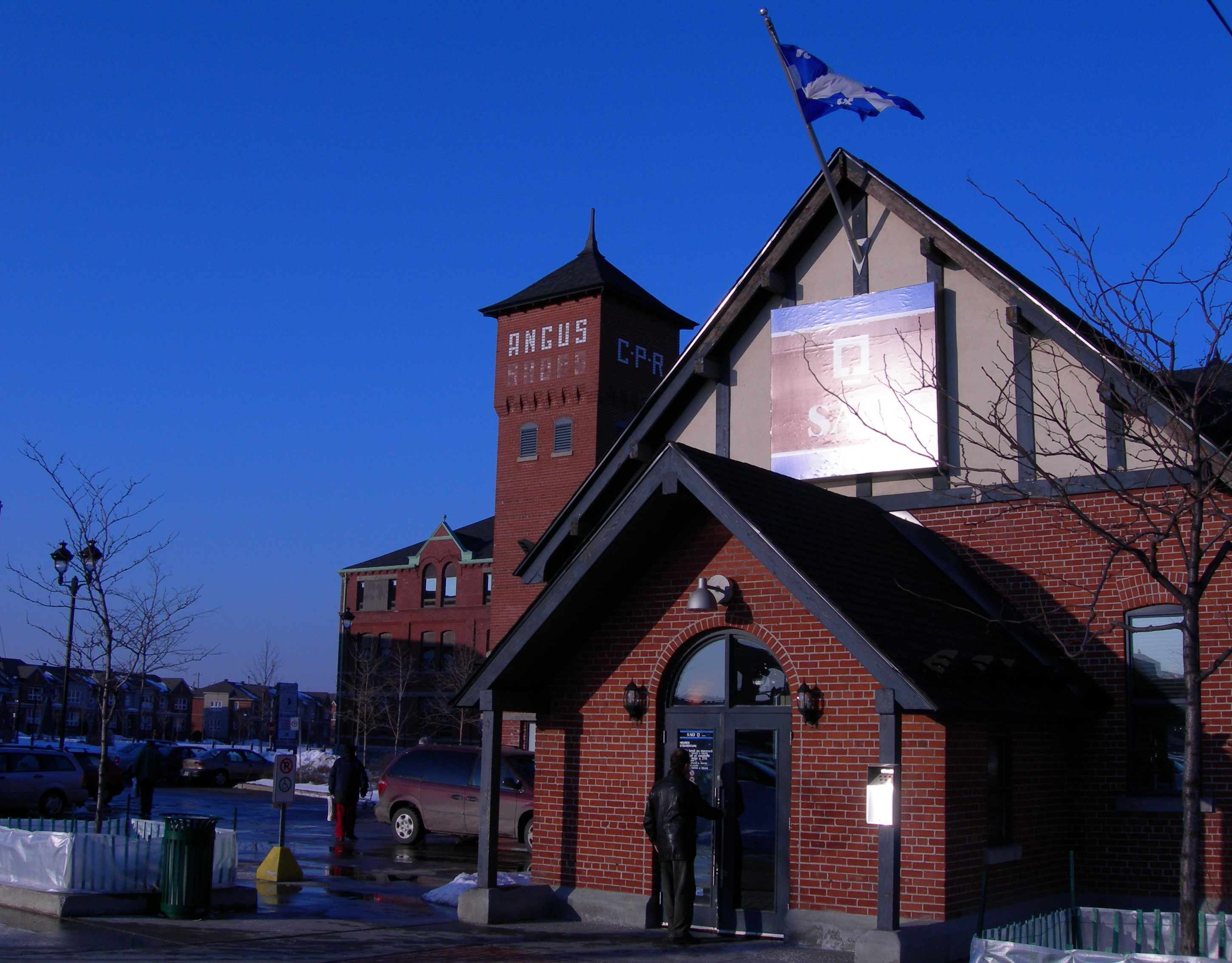
An Angus Shops building converted into a restaurant with an outdoor terrasse to the left.

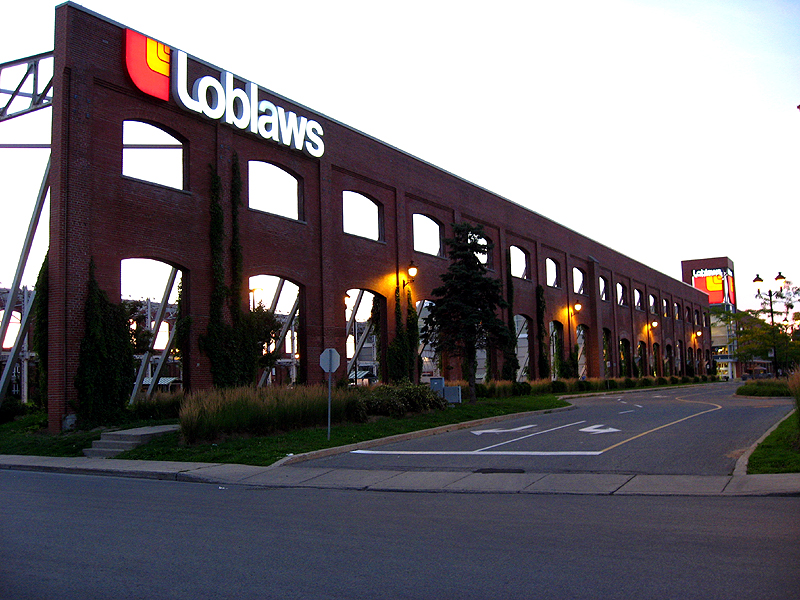
A Provigo grocery store branch located within the skeleton of the former CPR Angus Locoshop building

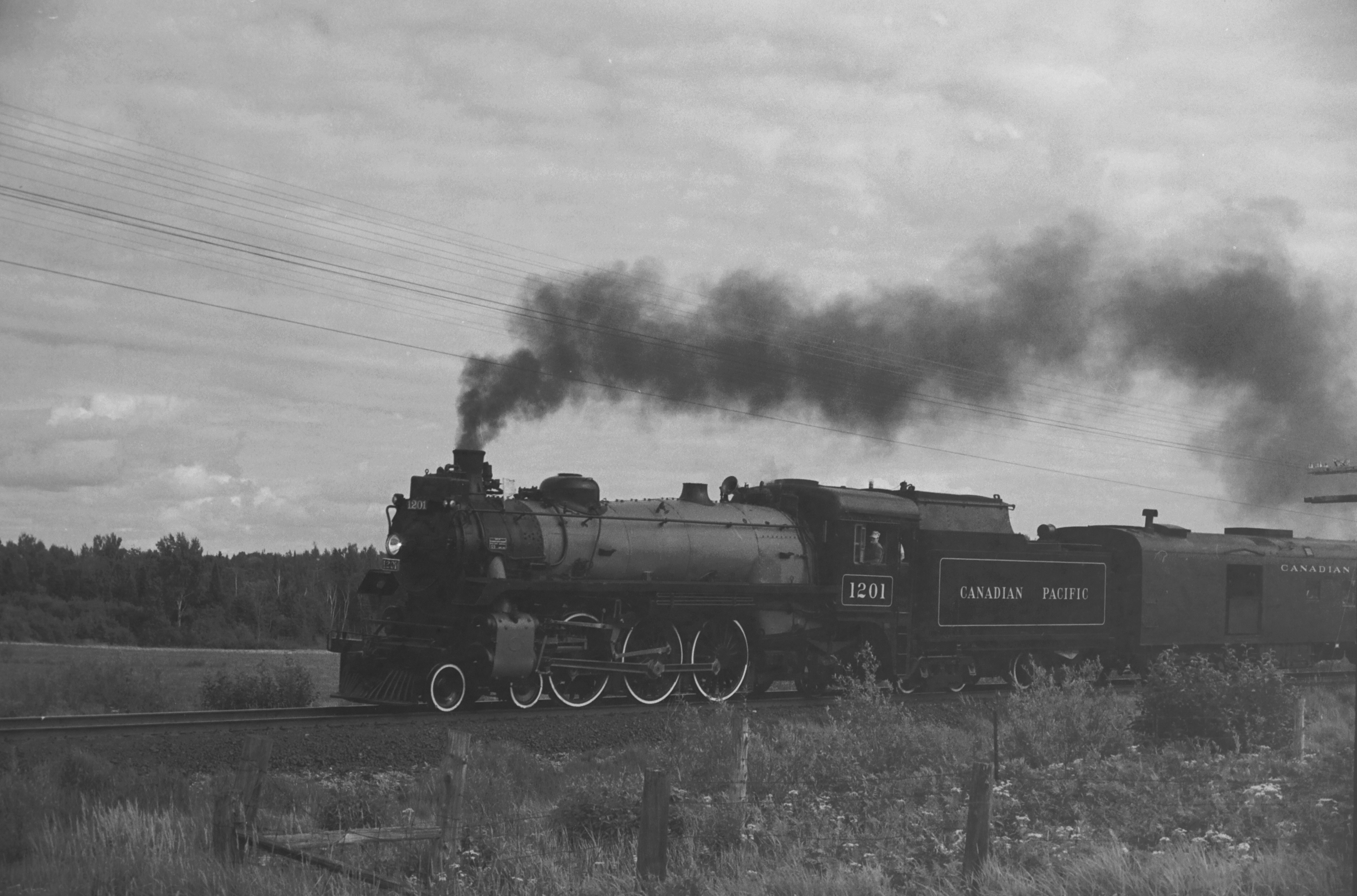
Canadian Pacific 1201, the last steam locomotive built at the CPR Angus Shops.

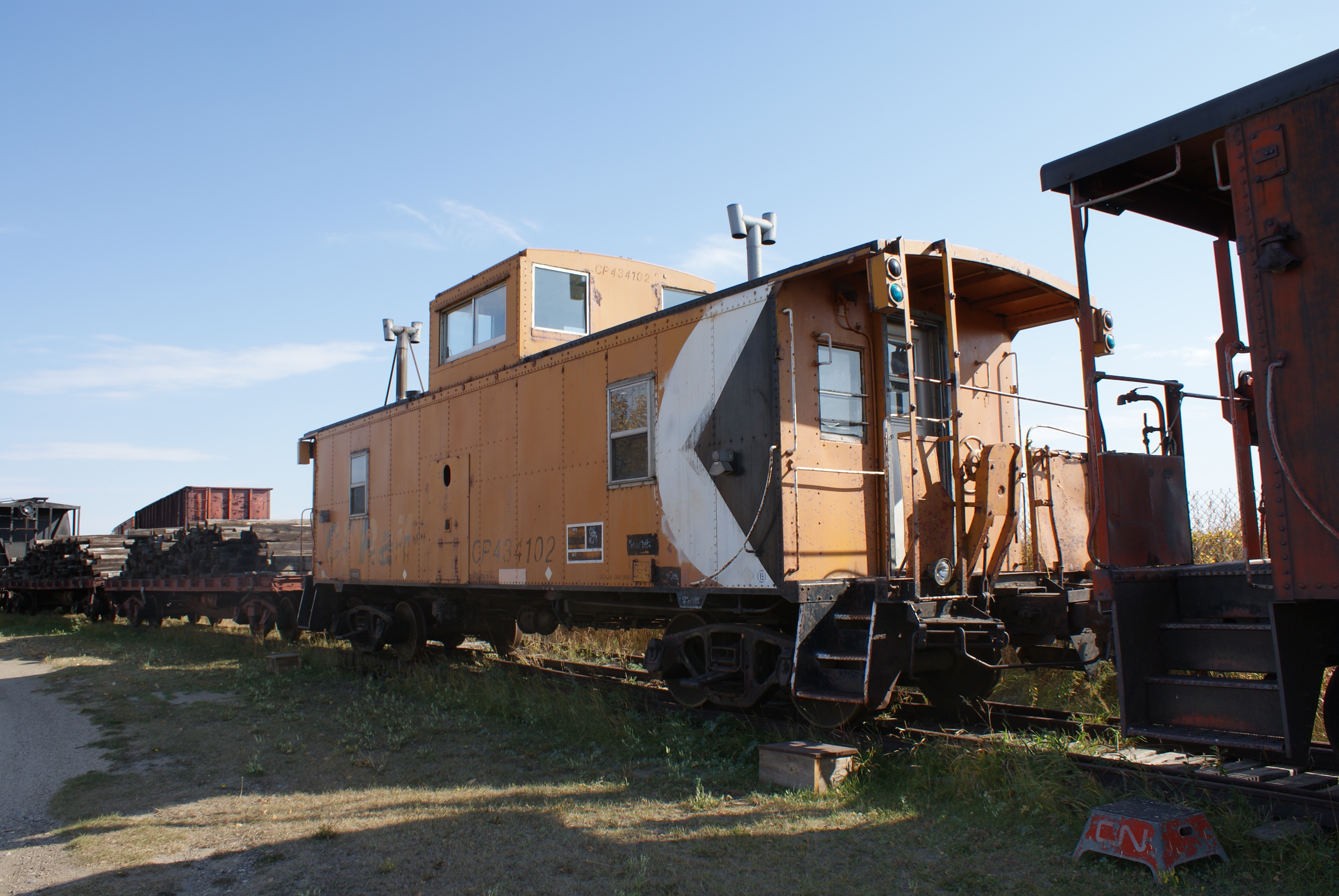
CPR caboose built by the CPR Angus Shops in 1949.
