= Frankfort and Cincinnati Model 55 Rail Car =

- U.S. National Register of Historic Places
- Location within Kentucky Location within the United States
- Location: 136 South Main Street, New Haven, Kentucky
- Coordinates: 37°39′22″N 85°35′34″W
- Built: 1927
- Architect: Brill Company, Philadelphia
- Architectural style: Railroad car
- NRHP reference No.: 97001344
- Added to NRHP: October 08, 1998

The Frankfort and Cincinnati Model 55 Rail Car (also known as "The Cardinal" and, colloquially to residents along it route, as The Dinky) is a historic railcar on the National Register of Historic Places. The railcar currently resides at the Kentucky Railway Museum in New Haven, Nelson County, Kentucky.

It was built in 1927 by the Brill Company of Philadelphia, Pennsylvania. It is a steel rail car, heavy four-cylinder gasoline mechanical drive train engine, that could hold 43 passengers and baggage, with measurements of 43.42 feet (13.23 m) long by 8.33 feet (2.54 m) wide. Weighing only 29,000 pounds (13,000 kg), it was cheap to use, costing only 16 cents a mile. Due to always being painted red, it was called "The Cardinal", in tribute to the state bird.

The Cardinal ran the "Whiskey Route" of the Frankfort and Cincinnati Railroad traveling from Frankfort, Kentucky to Paris, Kentucky, with a major stop in Georgetown, Kentucky plus nine other rural towns and hamlets; a distance of 40 miles (64 km). On December 31, 1952, when the F&C stopped passenger service, The Cardinal was retired; passenger trains could not compete with automobiles. The Cardinal broke an axle on Christmas Eve eight days before, and for the last week of passenger service the F&C Superintendent A.E. Parker used his own sedan to transport what few passengers the F&C still had from Frankfort to Paris.

The Kentucky Railway Museum gained possession of The Cardinal in 1960. In 1997 it was one of a maximum of six known gas-powered motor rail cars left in the United States, and the only one in the Southeastern United States.

The Frankfort and Cincinnati Model 55 Rail Car is one of four train vehicles at the Kentucky Railway Museum on the National Register. The others are the Louisville and Nashville Steam Locomotive No. 152, the Louisville and Nashville Combine Car Number 665, and the Mt. Broderick Pullman Car.

The F&C had two Brill Railcars: M55-1 and #2. It was #2 that broke the axle while crossing the Southern Ry at Georgetown, Ky.
