= Mt. Broderick Pullman Car =

Historic American railcar

Mt. Broderick 10-section buffet-lounge
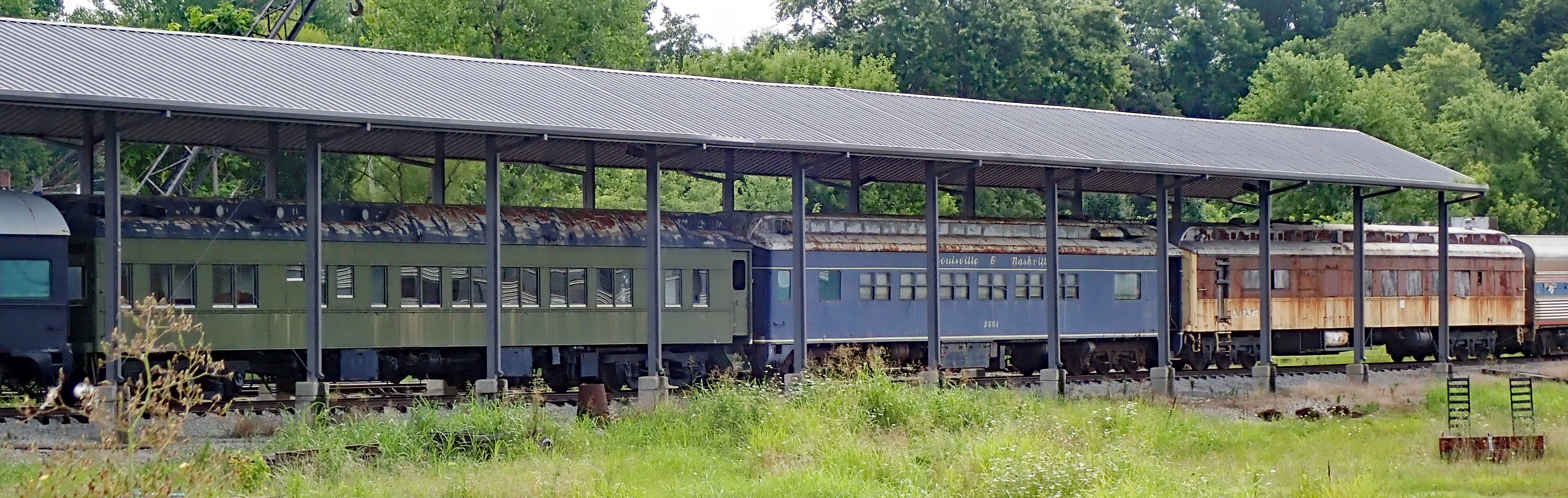
- Mt. Broderick (on left) with L&N 2554 (middle) and CMPA 197808 (right) in 2025
- Manufacturer: Pullman Company
- Order no.: Lot 4998
- Constructed: 1926
- Diagram: Plan 3521A, later 3521L
- Capacity: 20 in 10 sections

Specifications
- Weight: 93 short tons (84 t)
- Bogies: Type 2410A
- Track gauge: 4 ft 8 1/2 in (1,435 mm)

- MT. BRODERICK Pullman Lounge-Obs-Sleeping Car
- U.S. National Register of Historic Places
- Location within Kentucky Location within the United States
- Location: 136 S. Main St., New Haven, Kentucky
- Coordinates: 37°39′22″N 85°35′34″W
- Built: 1926
- Architect: Pullman Company, Chicago, IL
- Architectural style: Railroad Car
- NRHP reference No.: 97001345
- Added to NRHP: November 18, 1997

The Mt. Broderick Pullman Car is a historic railcar on the National Register of Historic Places, currently at the Kentucky Railway Museum at New Haven, Kentucky, in southernmost Nelson County, Kentucky. It has been described as a "four-star hotel" on rails.

Mt. Broderick was built in two months in late 1926 at the Pullman factory in Chicago, Illinois. It was one of thirty cars built on Lot 4998 to Plan 3521A. It had ten sections (numbered 1 to 10) and a 12-seat lounge area (numbered 11 to 22). In its normal overnight-mode, it could sleep 20, although in day-mode, it could seat a maximum of fifty-two passengers. It weighed 93 tons, due in part to its poured concrete floor; a feature unique to the Mt. Broderick. Passengers enjoyed the solarium lounge at its rear, as well as its buffet area. Polished brass fixtures were in the restroom area. Modifications to the car in 1935 included redoing the solarium, and replacing its crude blown air onto ice method of cooling to a then-modern air conditioning system. It ran the "Southland" Route of the Louisville and Nashville Railroad in the 1940s and 1950s; Atlanta, Chicago, Cincinnati, Fort Wayne, and St. Louis were regular stops of the route.

The Kentucky Railway Museum purchased the Mt. Broderick from the Pullman Company in 1958. It replaced the paint and carpet of the car with paint and carpet from the Pullman company, to keep it looking as it did during its active days. The car was also restored in late 1997.

The Mt. Broderick Pullman Car is one of four artifacts at the Kentucky Railway Museum on the National Register of Historic Places. The others are the Louisville and Nashville Steam Locomotive No. 152, the Louisville and Nashville Combine Car Number 665, and the Frankfort and Cincinnati Model 55 Rail Car.

== See also ==
- Dinwiddie County Pullman Car – another car from the same Lot, that had a different refurbishment.
