= List of preserved EMD SD45-series locomotives =

This is a summary, listing every diesel locomotive from the SD45-series in preservation. This list includes the models SD45, SDP45, SD45-2 and SD45T-2.

== SD45 ==
| Photograph | Serial no. | Locomotive | Build date | Model | Former operators | Retire date | Disposition and location | Notes | References |
|---|---|---|---|---|---|---|---|---|---|
| | 31598 | Great Northern 400 | May 1966 | SD45 | Great Northern Railway (GN); Burlington Northern Railroad (BN) | May 2009 | Operational at the Lake Superior Railroad Museum (LSRM) in Duluth, Minnesota | | |
| | 31843 | R.J. Corman 2011 | December 1966 | SD45 | Atlantic Coast Line Railroad (ACL); Seaboard Coast Line Railroad (SCL); Seaboard System (SBD); CSX Transportation (CSXT); VMV Enterprises (VMVX); Morrison–Knudsen (MKCX); Helm Leasing (HLCX); R.J. Corman | | Static display at R.J. Corman's yard in Lexington, Kentucky | | |
| | 31991 | Southern Pacific 7457 | August 1966 | SD45R | Southern Pacific Transportation Company (SP); Union Pacific Railroad (UP) | February 7, 2001 | On static display at the Utah State Railroad Museum in Ogden, Utah | | |
| | 32464 | Kansas City Southern de México 1200 | June 1966 | SD45 | Delaware and Hudson Railway (D&H); Erie Lackawanna Railway (EL); Transportación Ferroviaria Mexicana (TFM); Kansas City Southern de México (KCSM) | | On static display at the Rail Museum of Heroica Matamoros in Matamoros, Mexico | Built as demonstrator unit no. 4354 | |
| | 33038 | Northern Pacific 3617 | May 1967 | SD45 | Northern Pacific Railway (NP); Burlington Northern Railroad (BN); Wisconsin Central Railroad (WC) | March 1987 | Operational at the Lake Superior Railroad Museum (LSRM) in Duluth, Minnesota | | |
| | 33107 | Erie Lackawanna 3607 | June 1967 | SD45 | Erie Lackawanna Railway (EL); Conrail (CR) | - | Static display at the National Museum of Transportation in St. Louis, Missouri | | |
| | 35532 | Norfolk and Western 1776 | February 1970 | SD45 | Norfolk and Western Railway (N&W) | February 29, 1988 | On static display at the Virginia Museum of Transportation (VMT) in Roanoke, Virginia | | |
| | 37147 | Wisconsin Central 7525 | August 1971 | SD45 | Burlington Northern Railroad (BN); Wisconsin Central Railroad (WC) | - | Operational at the Illinois Railway Museum (IRM) in Union, Illinois | | |
| | 37715 | Seaboard Coast Line 2024 | September 1971 | SD45 | Seaboard Coast Line (SCL); Seaboard System (SBD); I&M Rail Link (IMRL); Montana Rail Link (MRL); Northern Illinois & Wisconsin Railway (NIWX) | - | Operational at the Southern Appalachia Railway Museum in Oak Ridge, Tennessee | Currently painted and numbered as "Clinchfield 3632" | |
| | 37725 | R.J. Corman 2012 | October 1971 | SD45 | Seaboard Coast Line Railroad (SCL); Seaboard System (SBD); CSX Transportation (CSXT); Helm Leasing (HLCX); R.J. Corman | | Static display at R.J. Corman's yard in Lexington, Kentucky | | |

== SDP45 ==
| Serial no. | Locomotive | Build date | Model | Former operators | Retire date | Disposition and location | Notes | References |
|---|---|---|---|---|---|---|---|---|
| 34980 | Erie Lackawanna 3639 | May 1969 | SDP45 | Erie Lackawanna Railway (EL); Conrail (CR); Norfolk and Western Railway (N&W) | October 1, 1986 | Stored at the Virginia Museum of Transportation in Roanoke, Virginia | | |

== SD45-2 ==
| Photograph | Works no. | Locomotive | Build date | Model | Former operators | Retire date | Disposition and location | Notes | References |
|---|---|---|---|---|---|---|---|---|---|
| | 72642-18 | Santa Fe 5704 | May 1973 | SD45-2u | Atchison, Topeka and Santa Fe (AT&SF); Burlington Northern Santa Fe (BNSF) | 2008 | Operational at the Southern California Railway Museum (SCRM) in Perris, California. | | |
| | 74601-5 | CSX 8954 | August 1974 | SD45-2 | Seaboard Coast Line (SCL); Seaboard System (SBD); CSX Transportation (CSX) | 2011 | Under restoration at the Southeastern Railway Museum in Duluth, Georgia | | |

== SD45T-2 ==
| Photograph | Works no. | Locomotive | Build date | Model | Former operators | Retire date | Disposition and location | Notes | References |
|---|---|---|---|---|---|---|---|---|---|
| | 7336-28 | Southern Pacific 6819 | March 1972 | SD45T-2R | Southern Pacific Transportation Company (SP); Union Pacific Railroad (UP) | July 12, 2001 | Operational at the California State Railroad Museum (CSRM) in Sacramento, California | | |

== Formerly preserved, scrapped ==
| Works no. | Locomotive | Build date | Model | Former operators | Retire date | Last seen | Scrap date | Notes | References |
|---|---|---|---|---|---|---|---|---|---|
| 34396 | Reading Blue Mountain and Northern 3200 | March 1969 | SD45R | Southern Pacific Transportation Company (SP); Union Pacific Railroad (UP); Reading Blue Mountain and Northern Railroad (RBM&N) | June 20, 2001 | Reading Blue Mountain and Northern Railroad in Port Clinton, Pennsylvania | November 2011 | | |
| 36881 | VMVX 6694 | August 1970 | SDP45 | Erie Lackawanna Railway (EL); Conrail (CR); VMV Enterprises (VMVX) | - | Ronald M. Delivan Industries (RDMI) in Pittston, Pennsylvania | January 31, 2012 | | |

== See also ==
- List of preserved EMD locomotives
