= List of preserved EMD locomotives =

A number of locomotives constructed by Electro-Motive Diesel (EMD) and Electro-Motive Corporation (EMC), have been preserved in museums, on tourist railroads, and various other locations across the world. Each locomotive is listed by serial number.

== Streamlined power cars ==
Photograph	Works no.	Locomotive	Build date	Model	Former operators	Retire date	Disposition and location	Notes	References
	529	Boston and Maine #6000 Flying Yankee	February 1935	BM-MEC 6000	Boston and Maine Railroad (B&M)	1957	Awaiting restoration at the Flying Yankee Association	Built by the Budd Company, but designed by EMD	
	532	Baltimore and Ohio #50	August 1935	1,800 hp B-B	Baltimore and Ohio Railroad (B&O); Chicago and Alton Railroad (C&A); Gulf, Mobile and Ohio Railroad (GM&O)	1937 (B&O)	Stored at the National Museum of Transportation in St. Louis, Missouri	Built by General Electric (GE), but designed by EMD	
	21463	Chicago, Rock Island and Pacific 3	August 1955	LWT12	Chicago, Rock Island and Pacific Railroad (CRIP)	-	Displayed at the National Museum of Transportation in St. Louis, Missouri		
	21464	Chicago, Rock Island and Pacific 2	August 1955	LWT12	Chicago, Rock Island and Pacific Railroad (CRIP)	-	Displayed at the National Railroad Museum in Green Bay, Wisconsin		

== Gas-Electric Railcar ==
Photograph	Works no.	Locomotive	Build date	Former operators	Retire date	Disposition and location	Notes	References
	130	Montana Western 31	October 28, 1925	Great Northern Railway (GN); Montana Western Railway (MW)	-	Under restoration at the Mid-Continent Railway Museum in North Freedom, Wisconsin	Oldest surviving unit built by EMD (then EMC)	

== Switchers ==
=== SC ===
Photograph	Works no.	Locomotive	Build date	Variant	Former operators	Retire date	Disposition and location	Notes	References
	517	Delaware Lackawanna and Western 426	February 1935	Pre-SC	Delaware, Lackawanna and Western Railroad (DL&W); Delaware-Lackawanna Railroad (DL)	-	On static display at the Steamtown National Historic Site in Scranton, Pennsylvania		
	711	Dardanelle and Russellville 14	July 1937	SC	Missouri Pacific Railroad (MP); Dardanelle and Russellville Railroad (D&R)	-	Stored at the Illinois Railway Museum in Union, Illinois		

=== SW ===
Photograph	Works no.	Locomotive	Build date	Former operators	Retire date	Disposition and location	Notes	References
	654	Philadelphia, Bethlehem and New England 206	March 1937	Philadelphia, Bethlehem and New England Railroad (PB&NE); Steelton and Highspire Railroad (S&H); Maryland and Pennsylvania Railroad (M&P); Stewartstown Railroad (STRT); Reading Blue Mountain and Northern Railroad (RB&N)	-	Operational at the Allentown and Auburn Railroad in Kutztown, Pennsylvania.		
	718	Thermal Belt 1	July 1938	Union Terminal Railway (UTR); St. Joseph Belt Railway (SJB); Missouri Pacific Railroad (MP); Pickens Railroad (PICK); Birmingham Rail and Locomotive Company (BRL); Chattahoochee Locomotive Company	-	Stored at the Thermal Belt Railway (TBRY) at Morganton, North Carolina		

=== SW1 ===
Photograph	Works no.	Locomotive	Build date	Model	Former operators	Retire date	Disposition and location	Notes	References
	912	Boston and Maine 1109	November 1939	SW1	Boston and Maine Railroad (B&M); Montpelier and Barre Railroad (M&B); Pioneer Valley Railroad (PVRR)		Display at the Railroad Museum of New England in Thomaston, Connecticut		
	988	Sacramento Northern 402	December 1939	SW1	Western Pacific Railroad (WP); Sacramento Northern Railway (SN)		Operational at the California State Railroad Museum in Sacramento, California		
	1564	Louisville and Nashville 13	December 1941	SW1	Louisville and Nashville Railroad (L&N)		Static display at the Foley Railroad Depot in Foley, Alabama		
	1597	Monon DS-50	February 1942	SW1	Monon Railroad (MON/CIL); Indiana Transportation Museum (ITM)		Under restoration at the Hoosier Valley Railroad Museum in North Judson, Indiana	First diesel owned by the Monon.	
	1714	Pere Marquette 11	April 1942	SW1	Pere Marquette Railway (PM); Chesapeake and Ohio Railway (C&O)		Static display at the B&O Railroad Museum in Baltimore, Maryland		
	10538	Commonwealth Edison 15	September 1950	SW1	Commonwealth Edison; Midwest Generation LLC		Operational at the Illinois Railway Museum in Union, Illinois		

=== SW7 ===
Photograph	Works no.	Locomotive	Build date	Model	Former operators	Retire date	Disposition and location	Notes	References
	8499	Burlington Route 9255	May 1950	SW7	Burlington Route (CBQ); Burlington Northern Railroad (BN); Davenport, Rock Island and North Western (DRINW)		Operational at the Illinois Railway Museum in Union, Illinois		
	9756	Conemaugh and Black Lick 111	August 1949	SW7	Conemaugh and Black Lick Railroad (CBL)		Operational on the Western Maryland Scenic Railroad in Cumberland, Maryland		
	10975	Southern 8202	May 1950	SW7	Georgia Southern and Florida Railway (GSF); Southern Railway (SOU)		Operational at the Southeastern Railway Museum in Duluth, Georgia		

=== SW8 ===
Photograph	Works no.	Locomotive	Build date	Model	Former operators	Retire date	Disposition and location	Notes	References
	15003	Sacramento Southern 2008	May 1951	SW8	United States Army (USAX)		Operational on the Sacramento Southern Railroad in Sacramento, California		
	15014	Calera and Shelby 2019	May 1951	SW8	United States Army (USAX)		Operational at the Heart of Dixie Railroad Museum in Calera, Alabama		
	15016	US Air Force 2021	May 1951	SW8	United States Air Force (USAF)		Static display at the Cape Canaveral Space Force Museum in Cape Canaveral, Florida		
	15017	Calera and Shelby 2022	May 1951	SW8	United States Army (USAX)		Operational at the Heart of Dixie Railroad Museum in Calera, Alabama		
	15025	Sacramento Southern 2030	May 1951	SW8	United States Army (USAX)		Operational on the Sacramento Southern Railroad in Sacramento, California		
	15033	US Army 2038	June 1951	SW8	United States Army (USAX)		Operational at the Tennessee Central Railway Museum in Nashville, Tennessee.	Painted as Tennessee Central 52.	
	16193	Strasburg 8618	1952	SW8	New York Central Railroad (NYC); Conrail (CR); Larry's Truck and Electric (LETX); Lewisburg and Black Creek Railroad (LBC)		Operational at the Strasburg Rail Road in Strasburg, Pennsylvania.		

=== SW1200 ===
Photograph	Works no.	Locomotive	Build date	Model	Former operators	Retire date	Disposition and location	Notes	References
	18759	Milwaukee Road 615	January 1954	SW1200	Milwaukee Road (MILW); Chrome Crankshaft; United States Navy (USN); United States Army (USAX)	1983	Operational at the Oklahoma Railway Museum in Oklahoma City, Oklahoma.		
	20047	Milwaukee Road 606	December 1954	SW1200	Milwaukee Road (MILW); Chrome Crankshaft; United States Navy (USN)	1983	Operational at the Tennessee Valley Railroad Museum in Chattanooga, Tennessee.		
	20675	Illinois Terminal 784	December 1955	SW1200	Illinois Terminal Railroad (ITC); Norfolk and Western Railway (N&W); Norfolk Southern Railway (NS); Sequatchie Valley Railroad (SQVR); Knoxville Locomotive Works (KLWX)	-	Stored, awaiting restoration at the Monticello Railway Museum in Monticello, Illinois.		
	23480	"Northern Pacific 105"	July 1957	SW1200	Lake Superior Terminal Transfer (LSTT)	January 1986	Operational at the Lake Superior Railroad Museum in Duluth, Minnesota	Never operated on the Northern Pacific Railroad	
	30019	Denver and Rio Grande Western 133	January 1965	SW1200	Denver and Rio Grande Western Railroad (DRGW); Diesel Supply Co. (DLSX)	-	On static display, awaiting restoration at the Utah State Railroad Museum in Ogden, Utah.	Owned by the Promontory Chapter NRHS	

=== SW1500 ===
Photograph	Works no.	Locomotive	Build date	Model	Former operators	Retire date	Disposition and location	Notes	References
	7343-1	CaterParrott Railnet 3000	December 1972	SW1500	Missouri Pacific Railroad (MP); Union Pacific Railroad (UP); Chicago Rail Link (CRL); Progress Rail Leasing (PRSX)	January 1, 1988			
	35938	CSX 1100	April 1970	SW1500	Louisville and Nashville (L&N); Seaboard System (SBD); CSX Transportation (CSXT)		Operational at the Kentucky Steam Heritage Corporation in Ravenna, Kentucky		
	35941	CSX 1103	April 1970	SW1500	Louisville and Nashville (L&N); Seaboard System (SBD); CSX Transportation (CSXT)		Operational at the Kentucky Railway Museum in New Haven, Kentucky		
	36164	NASA 2	May 1970	SW1500	Toledo, Peoria and Western (TPW); NASA Railroad (NASA)		Operational at the Gold Coast Railroad Museum in Miami, Florida		
	36862	Wisconsin Central 1563	March 1971	SW1500	Wisconsin Central (WC)		Operational at the National Railroad Museum in Green Bay, Wisconsin		
	72692-3	Western Pacific 1503	May 1973	SW1500	Western Pacific Railroad (WP); Union Pacific Railroad (UP)		Operational at the Western Pacific Railroad Museum in Portola, California		

=== NC ===
Photograph	Works no.	Locomotive	Build date	Model	Former operators	Retire date	Disposition and location	Notes	References
	651	Sabine River and Northern 408	May 1937	NC	Elgin, Joliet and Eastern Railway (EJE); Sabine River and Northern Railroad (SRN)		Display at the National Museum of Transportation in Kirkwood, Missouri		

=== NW2 ===
Photograph	Works no.	Locomotive	Build date	Model	Former operators	Retire date	Disposition and location	Notes	References
	889	Union Pacific 1000	November 1947	NW2	Union Pacific Railroad (UP); Western Pacific Railroad (WP); Sacramento Northern Railway (SN)	-	Operational at the Nevada State Railroad Museum Boulder City in Boulder City, Nevada	Built as demonstrator no. 889	
	3281	BUGX 1301	July 1945	SW1300	Illinois Central Railroad (IC); Chicago Central and Pacific Railroad (CC&P); Peoria and Western Railway (PWRY); Pioneer Rail Equipment (PREX); Dieselmotive Company, Inc. (BUGX)	-	Operational at the Big South Fork Scenic Railway (BSFS) at Stearns, Kentucky		
	4161	Maryland and Pennsylvania 81	December 1946	NW2	Maryland and Pennsylvania Railroad (MPA); PH Glatfelter Paper Company	1997	Display at the Railroad Museum of Pennsylvania in Strasburg, Pennsylvania		
	5240	Milwaukee Road 1649	November 1947	NW2	Milwaukee Road (MILW)	-	Display at the Monticello Railway Museum in Monticello, Illinois	Also wore the number 667 in its service with the Milwaukee Road.	
	7314	Southern Pacific 1423	June 1949	NW2E	Southern Pacific Railroad (SP); Parr Terminal Railroad (PTRR)	1986	Operational at the Niles Canyon Railway in Sunol, California		
	10598	Domtar 1001	October 1949	NW2	Arkansas, Louisiana and Mississippi Railroad (ALM); Domtar	-	Under restoration at the Mid-Continent Railway Museum in North Freedom, Wisconsin		

=== RS1325 ===
Photograph	Works no.	Locomotive	Build date	Model	Former operators	Retire date	Disposition and location	Notes	References
	25773	Chicago and Illinois Midland 30	September 1960	RS1325	Chicago and Illinois Midland Railway (CIM); Illinois and Midland Railroad (IMRR); Atlantic and Western Railway (ATW)	-	Operational at the Illinois Railway Museum in Union, Illinois		
	25774	Chicago and Illinois Midland 31	September 1960	RS1325	Chicago and Illinois Midland Railway (CIM); Illinois and Midland Railroad (IMRR); Atlantic and Western Railway (ATW)	-	Operational at the Monticello Railway Museum in Monticello, Illinois		

== Freight cab units (F) ==
=== FT ===
Photograph	Works no.	Locomotive	Build date	Model	Former operators	Retire date	Disposition and location	Notes	References
	1030A	EMDX 103	March 1939	FTA	Electro-Motive Diesel (EMDX)	-	On static display at the National Museum of Transportation in St. Louis, Missouri		
	1824	Southern 960603	October 1943	FTB	Southern Railway (SR)	-	Stored at the National Museum of Transportation in St. Louis, Missouri		

=== F3 ===
Photograph	Works no.	Locomotive	Build date	Model	Former operators	Retire date	Disposition and location	Notes	References
	5888	Canadian National 9000	May 1948	F3A	Canadian National Railway (CN)	October 1971	Operational at the Alberta Railway Museum in Edmonton, Alberta		

=== F7 ===
Photograph	Works no.	Locomotive	Build date	Model	Former operators	Retire date	Disposition and location	Notes	References
	8476	Boston and Maine 4266	March 1949	F7A	Boston and Maine Railroad (B&M)	-	Operational at the Conway Scenic Railroad in North Conway, New Hampshire		
	8973	Western Pacific 918-D	January 1950	F7A	Western Pacific Railroad (WP)	March 1981	Operational at the Niles Canyon Railway in Sunol, California		
	9932	Boston and Maine 4268	October 1949	F7A	Boston and Maine Railroad (B&M)	-	Operational at the Conway Scenic Railroad in North Conway, New Hampshire		

=== FP7 ===
Photograph	Works no.	Locomotive	Build date	Model	Former operators	Retire date	Disposition and location	Notes	References
	9004	Western Pacific 805-A	January 1950	FP7	Western Pacific Railroad (WP)	1972	Operational at the Western Pacific Railroad Museum in Portola, California		
	19064	Alaska Railroad 1510	December 1953	FP7	Alaska Railroad (ARR); Wyoming and Colorado Railroad (WYCO); Arizona Central Railroad (AZCR)	-	Operational at the Verde Canyon Railroad in Clarkdale, Arizona		
	19065	Alaska Railroad 1512	December 1953	FP7	Alaska Railroad (ARR); Wyoming and Colorado Railroad (WYCO); Arizona Central Railroad (AZCR)	-	Operational at the Verde Canyon Railroad in Clarkdale, Arizona		

=== FP9 ===
Photograph	Works no.	Locomotive	Build date	Builder	Model	Former operators	Retire date	Disposition and location	Notes	References
	22651	NdeM 7020	October 1956	EMD	FP9A	Ferrocarriles Nacionales de México (NdeM)	-	On static display at the National Railway Museum in Puebla, Puebla.		

=== FP45 ===
Photograph	Works no.	Locomotive	Build date	Model	Former operators	Retire date	Disposition and location	Notes	References
	33189	Santa Fe 90	December 1967	FP45u/SDFP45	Atchison, Topeka and Santa Fe Railway (AT&SF); Burlington Northern and Santa Fe Railway (BNSF)	December 1999	On static display at the Oklahoma Railway Museum in Oklahoma City, Oklahoma		
	33197	Santa Fe 108	December 1967	FP45u/SDFP45	Atchison, Topeka and Santa Fe Railway (AT&SF); Burlington Northern and Santa Fe Railway (BNSF)	September 1997	Operational at the Southern California Railway Museum in Perris, California		

== Passenger cab units (E) ==
=== EA/EB ===
Photograph	Works no.	Locomotive	Build date	Model	Former operators	Retire date	Disposition and location	Notes	References
	666	Baltimore and Ohio 51	May 16, 1937	EA	Baltimore and Ohio Railroad (B&O)	-	On static display at the Baltimore and Ohio Railroad Museum in Baltimore, Maryland	GMC Class DE	

=== E7 ===
Photograph	Works no.	Locomotive	Build date	Model	Former operators	Retire date	Disposition and location	Notes	References
	3357	Pennsylvania Railroad 5901	September 1945	E7A	Pennsylvania Railroad (PRR); Penn Central Transportation Company (PC)	-	On static display at the Railroad Museum of Pennsylvania, in Strasburg, Pennsylvania	PRR Class EP-20	

=== E8 ===
Photograph	Works no.	Locomotive	Build date	Model	Former operators	Retire date	Disposition and location	Notes	References
	9677	Chicago, Burlington and Quincy 9939A	January 1950	E9AM	Chicago, Burlington and Quincy Railroad (CB&Q); Burlington Northern Railroad (BN); Maryland Area Rail Commuter (MARC)	-	On static display at the National Museum of Transportation in St. Louis, Missouri	Named "Village of Westmont" by BN when rebuilt as an E9AM.	

== Branch Line locomotives (BL) ==
=== BL2 ===
Photograph	Works no.	Locomotive	Build date	Model	Former operators	Retire date	Disposition and location	Notes	References
	4451	Monon 32	April 1948	BL2	Monon Railroad (MON/CIL)	-	Operational at the Kentucky Railway Museum in New Haven, Kentucky		
	5921	Western Maryland 81	October 1948	BL2	Western Maryland Railway (WM)	-	Static display at the B&O Railroad Museum in Baltimore, Maryland		
	5922	Western Maryland 82	October 1948	BL2	Western Maryland Railway (WM); South Branch Valley Railroad (SBVR)	-	Operational on the Durbin and Greenbrier Valley Railroad in Elkins, West Virginia		
	8163	Bangor & Aroostook 52	March 1949	BL2	Bangor and Aroostook Railroad (BAR); Janesville and Southeastern (JSE); Saratoga and North Creek Railway (SNC)	-	Operational at the Hoosier Valley Railroad Museum in North Judson, Indiana		
	8165	Bangor & Aroostook 54	April 1949	BL2	Bangor and Aroostook Railroad (BAR)	-	Operational on The Stourbridge Line in Honesdale, Pennsylvania		
	8616	Bangor & Aroostook 56	April 1949	BL2	Bangor and Aroostook Railroad (BAR); Saratoga and North Creek Railway (SNC)	-	Operational at the Hoosier Valley Railroad Museum in North Judson, Indiana		
	8617	Bangor & Aroostook 557	April 1949	BL2	Bangor and Aroostook Railroad (BAR)	-	Static display at the Cole Transportation Museum in Bangor, Maine		

== General Purpose locomotives (GP) ==
=== GP7 ===
Photograph	Works no.	Locomotive	Build date	Model	Former operators	Retire date	Disposition and location	Notes	References
	10852	Chicago and North Western 1518	October 1949	GP7	Chicago and North Western Transportation Company	-	Operational at the Illinois Railway Museum in Union, Illinois	EMD demonstrator unit	
	17597	Rock Island 4506	October 1952	GP7R	Chicago and North Western Transportation Company; Chicago, Rock Island and Pacific Railroad	-	Operational at the Illinois Railway Museum in Union, Illinois		
	18707	Illinois Terminal 1605	August 1953	GP7	Illinois Terminal Railroad; Norfolk and Western Railway	-	Operational at the Illinois Railway Museum in Union, Illinois		

=== GP9 ===
Photograph	Works no.	Locomotive	Build date	Model	Former operators	Retire date	Disposition and location	Notes	References
	19483	Southern Pacific 3194	May 1954	GP9R	Texas and New Orleans Railroad (T&NO); Southern Pacific Railroad (SP); Union Pacific Railroad (UP)	March 26, 1997	Operational at the Golden Gate Railroad Museum in Schellville, California		
	20710	Pennsylvania Railroad 7006	October 1955	GP9	Pennsylvania Railroad (PRR); Penn Central (PC); Conrail (CR)	1985	On static display at the Railroad Museum of Pennsylvania in Strasburg, Pennsylvania	PRR Class EFS-17M	
	20752	Pennsylvania Railroad 7048	December 1955	GP9	Pennsylvania Railroad (PRR); Penn Central (PC); Conrail (CR)	-	On static display at Horseshoe Curve in Altoona, Pennsylvania	PRR Class EFS-17M	

=== GP15 ===
Photograph	Works no.	Locomotive	Build date	Model	Former operators	Retire date	Disposition and location	Notes	References
	787249-75	Gettysburg Railway 1863	November 1979	GP15-1	Conrail (CR); CSX Transportation (CSX); Larry's Truck and Electric (LTEX)	-	Operational at the Gettysburg Railway in Gettysburg, Pennsylvania		
	817054-8	CSX 1507	October 1982	GP15T	Chesapeake and Ohio Railway (C&O); Chessie System (B&O/C&O/WM); CSX Transportation (CSX)	-	Operational at the Baltimore and Ohio Railroad Museum in Baltimore, Maryland		

=== GP18 ===
Works no.	Locomotive	Build date	Model	Former operators	Retire date	Disposition and location	Notes	References
25911	Louisville and Nashville 900	June 1960	GP18	Louisville and Nashville Railroad (LN); Seaboard System Railroad (SBD); CSX Transportation (CSX); Aberdeen, Carolina and Western Railway (ACWR)	-	Stored at the Southern Appalachia Railway Museum in Oak Ridge, Tennessee		

=== GP30 ===
Photograph	Works no.	Locomotive	Build date	Model	Former operators	Retire date	Disposition and location	Notes	References
	27355	Norfolk and Western 522	June 1962	GP30	Norfolk and Western Railway (N&W); Railroad Passenger Car and Numbering Bureau (RPCX); Cycle Systems Inc. (CSIX)	-	Operational, Owned by the Roanoke Chapter National Railroad Historical Society in Roanoke, Virginia	First and sole surviving GP30 built for the Norfolk and Western.	
	27553	Union Pacific 844	August 1962	GP30	Union Pacific Railroad (UP)	-	Operational at the Nevada State Railroad Museum in Boulder City, Nevada		
	27640	Baltimore and Ohio 6923	November 1962	GP30M	Baltimore and Ohio Railroad (B&O); Chessie System (B&O/C&O/WM); CSX Transportation (CSX); Nebraska, Kansas & Colorado RailNet (NKCR); Raritan Central Railway (RCRY)	1990s (CSX)	Operational at the Cincinnati Scenic Railway in Lebanon, Ohio	Currently painted in a semiquincentennial livery, to be restored to B&O "Sunburst" livery	
	27672	Chessie 6955	November 1962	GP30M	Baltimore and Ohio Railroad (B&O); Chessie System (B&O/C&O/WM); CSX Transportation (CSX); Eastern Idaho Railroad (EIRR); WATCO Rail Services (WAMX); National Railway Equipment Company (NREX)	-	Under restoration at the Cincinnati Scenic Railway in Lebanon, Ohio		
	28141	Conrail 2233	April 1963	GP30	Pennsylvania Railroad (PRR); Penn Central (PC); Conrail (CR)	1984	Display at the Railroad Museum of Pennsylvania in Strasburg, Pennsylvania		
	28157	Western Maryland Scenic 501	May 1963	GP30	Pennsylvania Railroad (PRR); Penn Central (PC); Conrail (CR)	-	Operational at the Western Maryland Scenic Railroad in Cumberland, Maryland		
	28564	Southern 2594	October 1963	GP30	Southern Railway (SOU); Norfolk Southern Railway (NS)	-	Operational at the Tennessee Valley Railroad Museum in Chattanooga, Tennessee	On loan from the Southeastern Railway Museum.	

=== GP35 ===
Photograph	Works no.	Locomotive	Build date	Model	Former operators	Retire date	Disposition and location	Notes	References
	28399	Western Pacific 3002	November 1963	GP35	Western Pacific (WP); Union Pacific (UP); Kyle Railroad (KYLE); Arkansas Midland (AMKD)	-	Static display at the Ogden Union Station in Ogden, Utah		
	28596	R.J. Corman 3501	October 1963	GP30R	Southern Railway (SOU); Norfolk Southern (NS); R.J. Corman	-	Static display at the Clarksville station in Clarksville, Tennessee	Originally a GP30. Wrecked and rebuilt to GP35 specks.	
	29573	Reading 3640	August 1964	GP35	Reading Company (RDG); Conrail (CR)	-	Under restoration at the Reading Company Technical and Historical Society in Hamburg, Pennsylvania		
	29752	Gulf, Mobile & Ohio 631	January 1965	GP35	Gulf, Mobile & Ohio (GMO); Illinois Central Gulf (ICG); Paducah & Louisville (PAL)	-	Under restoration at the Southern Appalachia Railway Museum in Oak Ridge, Tennessee		
	30054	Savannah & Atlanta 2715	January 1965	GP35	Savannah and Atlanta (S&A); Southern Railway (SOU)	-	Displayed at the Georgia State Railroad Museum in Savannah, Georgia		
	30297	Conway Scenic 216	March 1965	GP35	Norfolk and Western (NW); Springfield Terminal Railway (ST)	-	Operational at the Conway Scenic Railroad in North Conway, New Hampshire		

=== GP38 ===
Photograph	Works no.	Locomotive	Build date	Model	Former operators	Retire date	Disposition and location	Notes	References
	32661	Conway Scenic Railroad 252	November 1966	GP38	Maine Central Railroad (MEC); Boston and Maine Railroad (B&M)	-	Operational at the Conway Scenic Railroad in North Conway, New Hampshire		
	32664	Boston and Maine 255	November 1966	GP38	Maine Central Railroad (MEC); Boston and Maine Railroad (B&M); Clarendon and Pittsford Railroad (C&P)	-	Operational at the Conway Scenic Railroad in North Conway, New Hampshire		
	33802	Tennessee, Alabama and Georgia 80	February 1968	GP38	Tennessee, Alabama and Georgia Railway (TAG); Southern Railway (SOU); Norfolk Southern Railway (NS)	-	Operational at the Tennessee Valley Railroad Museum in Chattanooga, Tennessee	First high hood GP38 built	
	35075	Georgia Northeastern 2000	June 1969	GP38-2	Monongahela Railway (MGA); Chicago Central and Pacific Railroad (CC&P); RailGroup; Georgia Northeastern Railroad (GNRR)	-	Operational at the Blue Ridge Scenic Railway in Blue Ridge, Georgia		
	35335	West Chester 7706	July 1969	GP38	Penn Central (PC); Conrail (CR); PECO Energy; Exelon Corporation	-	Operational at the West Chester Railroad in West Chester, Pennsylvania		

=== GP38AC ===
Photograph	Works no.	Locomotive	Build date	Model	Former operators	Retire date	Disposition and location	Notes	References
	37443	BNSF 2127	April 1971	GP38AC	St Louis San Francisco (SLSF); Burlington Northern Railroad (BN); Burlington Northern and Santa Fe Railway (BNSF)	-	On static display at the Galveston Railroad Museum in Galveston, Texas		
	37638	Columbia and Cowlitz 3810	June 1971	GP38-2	Louisville and Nashville Railroad (L&N); Seaboard System Railroad (SBD); CSX Transportation (CSX); David J Joseph Company (JTPX); Lone Star Locomotive Leasing, LLC (LSLX); Larry's Truck and Electric (LTEX); Columbia and Cowlitz Railway (CCRY)	-	Operational at the Blue Ridge Scenic Railway in Blue Ridge, Georgia		

=== GP38-2 ===
Photograph	Works no.	Locomotive	Build date	Model	Former operators	Retire date	Disposition and location	Notes	References
	5809-1	Southern Railway 5000	January 1972	GP38-2	Southern Railway (SOU); Norfolk Southern Railway (NS)	-	Operational at the Tennessee Valley Railroad Museum in Chattanooga, Tennessee.		
	7342-2	Great Smoky Mountains 2335	March 1972	GP38-2	St. Louis–San Francisco Railway (SLSF); Burlington Northern Railroad (BN); BNSF Railway (BNSF)	-	Operational at the Great Smoky Mountains Railroad in Bryson City, North Carolina.		
	7362-35	Southern Railway 5044	March 1973	GP38-2	Southern Railway (SOU); Norfolk Southern Railway (NS)	-	Operational at the Tennessee Valley Railroad Museum in Chattanooga, Tennessee.		
	73752-2	Southern Railway 5109	January 1974	GP38-2	Southern Railway (SOU); Norfolk Southern Railway (NS)	-	Operational at the Tennessee Valley Railroad Museum in Chattanooga, Tennessee.		
	73752-21	Southern Railway 5128	January 1974	GP38-2	Southern Railway (SOU); Norfolk Southern Railway (NS)	-	Operational at the Colebrookdale Railroad in Boyertown, Pennsylvania.		

=== GP39-2 ===
Works no.	Locomotive	Build date	Model	Former operators	Retire date	Disposition and location	Notes	References
74640-12	CSX 4317	December 1974	GP39-2	Reading (RDG); Delaware & Hudson (D&H); CSX Transportation (CSXT)	-	Under ownership of the Reading Company Museum in Hamburg, Pennsylvania.		

=== GP40 ===
Photograph	Works no.	Locomotive	Build date	Model	Former operators	Retire date	Disposition and location	Notes	References
	32644	Baltimore and Ohio 3684	November 1966	GP40	Baltimore and Ohio Railroad (B&O); CSX Transportation (CSXT)	-	Operational at the Baltimore and Ohio Railroad Museum in Baltimore, Maryland		
	33234	Gettysburg Railway 1786	August 1967	GP40FH-2	New York Central Railroad (NYC); Penn Central (PC); Conrail (CR); New Jersey Transit (NJT); Iowa Pacific Holdings	-	Operational at the Gettysburg Railway in Gettysburg, Pennsylvania		
	34295	Penn Central 3118	August 1968	GP40-3	Denver and Rio Grande Western Railroad (D&GRW); Penn Central Transportation Company (PC); Conrail (CR); Southwestern Railroad Company (SW); Horizon Rail Leasing (HZRX)	-	Operational at the Austin Steam Train Association in Cedar Park, TX. Planned to be painted into Southern Pacific "Black Widow" inspired scheme.		
	36773	CaterParrott Railnet 7005	January 1971	GP40	Florida East Coast Railway (FEC); Progress Rail Leasing (PRLX)	-			

=== GP40-2 ===
Works no.	Locomotive	Build date	Model	Former operators	Retire date	Disposition and location	Notes	References
712954	Sonora Baja California 2107	December 1973	GP40-2	Ferrocarril Sonora–Baja California (SBC)	-	On static display at Mexicali, Baja California		

=== GP50 ===
Works no.	Locomotive	Build date	Model	Former operators	Retire date	Disposition and location	Notes	References
847065-24	Branson Scenic Railway 3133	1985	GP50	Burlington Northern Railroad (BN); Burlington Northern and Santa Fe Railway (BNSF)	-	Operational at the Branson Scenic Railway (BSR) in Branson, Missouri		

== Special Duty locomotives (SD) ==
=== SD7 ===
Photograph	Works no.	Locomotive	Build date	Model	Former operators	Retire date	Disposition and location	Notes	References
	15624	Southern Pacific 1518	May 1951	SD7R	Electro-Motive Diesel (EMD); Southern Pacific Transportation Company (SP); Union Pacific Railroad (UP)	May 5, 1997	Operational at the Illinois Railway Museum (IRM) in Union, Illinois		
	16107	Great Northern 558	May 1952	SD7	Great Northern Railway (GN); Burlington Northern Railroad (BN); Cargill	August 27, 1983	Display, awaiting restoration at the Minnesota Transportation Museum in Saint Paul, Minnesota	Currently BN 6008	
	16824	Nevada Northern 401	August 1952	SD7	Nevada Northern Railway (NN); Los Angeles Department of Water and Power (LADWP)	-	Stored at the Intermountain Power Plant in Delta, Utah	To be moved to the Nevada Northern Railway Museum	
	18310	Central of Georgia 201	May 1953	SD7	Central of Georgia Railway (CofG); Southern Railway (SOU)	-	Stored at the Virginia Museum of Transportation in Roanoke, Virginia		

=== SD9 ===
Photograph	Works no.	Locomotive	Build date	Model	Former operators	Retire date	Disposition and location	Notes	References
	18780	Milwaukee Road 532	February 1954	SD10	Milwaukee Road (MILW); Soo Line Railroad (SOO)	2001	Operational at the Whitewater Valley Scenic Railroad (WVSR) in Connersville, Indiana		
	19340	BNSF 1550	February 1954	SD9-3	Great Northern Railway (GN); Burlington Northern Railroad (BN); Burlington Northern and Santa Fe Railway (BNSF)	-	Operational at the Lake Superior Railroad Museum in Duluth, Minnesota		

=== SD18 ===
Photograph	Works no.	Locomotive	Build date	Model	Former operators	Retire date	Disposition and location	Notes	References
	25790	Duluth, Missabe and Iron Range 316	April 1960	SD-M	Duluth, Missabe and Iron Range Railway (DM&IR)	-	Operational at the Lake Superior Railroad Museum in Duluth, Minnesota		
	25797	Duluth, Missabe and Iron Range 193	April 1960	SD-M	Duluth, Missabe and Iron Range Railway (DM&IR)	-	Operational at the Lake Superior Railroad Museum in Duluth, Minnesota		
	27723	South Branch Valley Railroad 182	September 1962	SD18	Bessemer and Lake Erie Railroad (B&LE); Larry's Truck and Electric (LTEX)	-	Stored at the South Branch Valley Rail Road in Moorefield, West Virginia		

=== SD24 ===
Photograph	Works no.	Locomotive	Build date	Model	Former operators	Retire date	Disposition and location	Notes	References
	25201	Burlington Route 504	May 1959	SD24	Chicago, Burlington and Quincy Railroad (CB&Q); Burlington Northern Railroad (BN); Maryland Midland Railway (MMID)	June 1982	Operational at the Illinois Railway Museum in Union, Illinois		
	25207	Burlington Route 510	May 1959	SD24	Chicago, Burlington and Quincy Railroad (CB&Q); Burlington Northern Railroad (BN); Maryland Midland Railway (MMID); Wisconsin Central Railroad (WC); Fox River Valley Railroad (FRVR)	June 1982	Under restoration at the National Railroad Museum in Green Bay, Wisconsin		
	25415	Will County Coal Handling 1802	August 1959	SD20	Union Pacific Railroad (UP); Precision National Corporation (PNC); Illinois Central Gulf Railroad (ICG); Twin Cities and Western Railroad (TCW); Red River Valley and Western Railroad (RRVW); Commonwealth Edison (CE); Will County Coal Handling (WCCH)	October 1977 (UP); 1995 (ICG)	Operational, to be repainted at the Illinois Railway Museum in Union, Illinois		

=== SD35 ===
Photograph	Works no.	Locomotive	Build date	Model	Former operators	Retire date	Disposition and location	Notes	References
	25790	Baltimore & Ohio 7402	April 1960	SD35	Baltimore & Ohio (B&O); Chessie System; CSX Transportation (CSXT)	-	Static display at the B&O Railroad Museum in Baltimore, Maryland		
	29894	Western Maryland 7436	December 1964	SD38P	Western Maryland (WM); Burlington Northern (BN); BNSF Railway (BNSF); Georges Creek Railway (GCK)	-	Operational, Owned by Precision Locomotive Leasing (PNLX)	Rebuilt by Burlington Northern to SD38P	
	30448	Louisville & Nashville 1216	July 1965	SD35	Louisville & Nashville (L&N); Seaboard System (SBD); CSX Transportation (CSXT); Minnesota Valley (MNVA)	-	Under restoration at the Southern Appalachia Railway Museum in Oak Ridge, Tennessee		

=== SDP35 ===
Photograph	Works no.	Locomotive	Build date	Model	Former operators	Retire date	Disposition and location	Notes	References
	29353	Seaboard Air Line 1114	November 1964	SDP35	Seaboard Air Line (SAL); Seaboard Coast Line (SCL)	-	Static Display by the Hamlet station in Hamlet, North Carolina		

=== SD40 ===
Photograph	Works no.	Locomotive	Build date	Builder	Former operators	Retire date	Disposition and location	Notes	References
	29025	Illinois Central 6071	July 1964	Electro-Motive Division (EMD)	Gulf, Mobile and Ohio Railroad; Illinois Central Gulf Railroad; Illinois Central Railroad; Canadian National Railway	2009	On static display at the Monticello Railway Museum in Monticello, Illinois		
	37211	Chesapeake and Ohio 7534	March 1971	Electro-Motive Division (EMD)	Chesapeake and Ohio Railway; CSX Transportation	-	On static display at the C&O Historical Society in Clifton Forge, Virginia		

=== SDP40 ===
Photograph	Works no.	Locomotive	Build date	Former operators	Retire date	Disposition and location	Notes	References
	31597	Great Northern 325	May 1966	Great Northern (GN); Burlington Northern (BN); BNSF Railway	May 2009	Operational at the Minnesota Transportation Museum in Saint Paul, Minnesota		

=== SD40T-2 ===
Photograph	Works no.	Locomotive	Build date	Builder	Former operators	Retire date	Disposition and location	Notes	References
	756046-16	Denver and Rio Grande Western 5371	August 1975	Electro-Motive Division (EMD)	Denver and Rio Grande Western (DRGW); Union Pacific (UP)	December 5, 2008	On static display at the Utah State Railroad Museum in Ogden, Utah		
	786264-4	Denver and Rio Grande Western 5401	March 1980	Electro-Motive Division (EMD)	Denver and Rio Grande Western (DRGW); Union Pacific (UP)	-	Awaiting cosmetic restoration by the Colorado Railroad Museum in Golden, Colorado		

=== SD45 ===
Photograph	Works no.	Locomotive	Build date	Model	Former operators	Retire date	Disposition and location	Notes	References
	31598	Great Northern 400	May 1966	SD45	Great Northern Railway (GN); Burlington Northern Railroad (BN)	May 2009	Operational at the Lake Superior Railroad Museum in Duluth, Minnesota		
	33038	Northern Pacific 3617	May 1967	SD45	Northern Pacific Railway (NP); Burlington Northern Railroad (BN); Wisconsin Central Railroad (WC)	March 1987	Operational at the Lake Superior Railroad Museum in Duluth, Minnesota		
	35532	Norfolk and Western 1776	February 1970	SD45	Norfolk and Western Railway (N&W)	-	On static display at the Virginia Museum of Transportation in Roanoke, Virginia		

=== SD45-2 ===
Photograph	Works no.	Locomotive	Build date	Model	Former operators	Retire date	Disposition and location	Notes	References
	72642-18	Santa Fe 5704	May 1973	SD45-2u	Atchison, Topeka and Santa Fe (AT&SF); Burlington Northern Santa Fe (BNSF)	2008	Operational at the Southern California Railway Museum (SCRM) in Perris, California.		
	74601-5	CSX 8954	August 1974	SD45-2	Seaboard Coast Line (SCL); Seaboard System (SBD); CSX Transportation (CSX)	2011	Under restoration at the Southeastern Railway Museum in Duluth, Georgia		

=== SD45T-2 ===
Photograph	Works no.	Locomotive	Build date	Model	Former operators	Retire date	Disposition and location	Notes	References
	7336-28	Southern Pacific 6819	March 1972	SD45T-2R	Southern Pacific Transportation Company (SP); Union Pacific Railroad (UP)	July 12, 2001	Operational at the California State Railroad Museum (CSRM) in Sacramento, California		

=== SD50 ===
Photograph	Works no.	Locomotive	Build date	Former operators	Retire date	Disposition and location	Notes	References
	847049-10	Chicago and North Western 7009	November 1985	Chicago and North Western Transportation Company (CNW); Union Pacific Railroad (UP); National Railway Equipment Company (NREX)	April 20, 2001 (UP); 2006 (NREX)	Operational at the Illinois Railway Museum in Union, Illinois		

=== SD60I ===
Photograph	Works no.	Locomotive	Build date	Model	Former operators	Retire date	Disposition and location	Notes	References
	946506-8	Conrail 5582	November 1994	SD60I	Conrail (CR); Norfolk Southern (NS)		Static display at the Railroaders Memorial Museum in Altoona, Pennsylvania	Formerly displayed at Penn State University. Currently PSU 2020.	

=== SD70MAC ===
Photograph	Works no.	Locomotive	Build date	Model	Former operators	Retire date	Disposition and location	Notes	References
	926335-3	Burlington Northern Santa Fe 9400	1993	SD70MAC	Burlington Northern (BN); BNSF Railway (BNSF)		Operational at the Illinois Railway Museum in Union, Illinois		

=== SD70M-2 ===
Works no.	Locomotive	Build date	Model	Former operators	Retire date	Disposition and location	Notes	References
20046650-9	CaterParrott Railnet 9000	October 2005	SD70M-2	Norfolk Southern Railway (NS)	-			

=== SD70ACe ===
Photograph	Works no.	Locomotive	Build date	Model	Former operators	Retire date	Disposition and location	Notes	References
	20046610-115	Union Pacific 4141	July 2005	SD70ACe	Union Pacific (UP)	March 2021	On display at the George H.W. Bush Presidential Library & Museum in College Station, Texas		

== DDA40X ==
Photograph	Works No.	Locomotive	Build date	Former operators	Retire date	Disposition and location	Notes	References
	34526	Union Pacific 6900	April 1969	Union Pacific (UP)		On display at Kenefick Park in Omaha, Nebraska		
	34527	Union Pacific 6901	June 1969	Union Pacific (UP)		On display at Ross Park in Pocatello, Idaho		
	34537	Union Pacific 6911	October 1969	Union Pacific (UP)		On display at the Mexico Museum of Technology in Mexico City		
	34539	Union Pacific 6913	October 1969	Union Pacific (UP)		On display at the Museum of the American Railroad in Frisco, Texas		
	34541	Union Pacific 6915	October 1969	Union Pacific (UP)		On display at the RailGiants Train Museum in Pomona, California		
	34542	Union Pacific 6916	November 1969	Union Pacific (UP)		On display at the Union Station in Ogden, Utah		
	34548	Union Pacific 6922	December 1969	Union Pacific (UP)		On display at Cody Park in North Platte, Nebraska		
	35499	Union Pacific 6925	June 1970	Union Pacific (UP)		In storage in Chamberlain, South Dakota. Now owned by Midwest Overland Rail Preservation Society.		
	35504	Union Pacific 6930	August 1970	Union Pacific (UP)		Under restoration at the Illinois Railway Museum in Union, Illinois		
	35510	Union Pacific 6936	January 1971	Union Pacific (UP)		Operational, Owned by Railroading Heritage of Midwest America Silvis, Illinois		
	35512	Union Pacific 6938	June 1971	Union Pacific (UP)		On display at the Jenks Locomotive Facility in North Little Rock, Arkansas		
	35518	Union Pacific 6944	August 1971	Union Pacific (UP)		On display at the National Museum of Transportation in Kirkwood, Missouri		
	35520	Union Pacific 6946	September 1971	Union Pacific (UP)		On display at the Western Pacific Railroad Museum in Portola, California		

== Rebuilds ==
=== SW14 ===
Photograph	Works No.	Locomotive	Build date	Model	Former operators	Retire date	Disposition and location	Notes	References
	11659	Illinois Central 1407	August 1950	SW14	Illinois Central Railroad (IC); Illinois Central Gulf (ICG); Canadian National Railway (CN); Relco (RLCX); GATX Rail (GMTX)	-	Stored, awaiting restoration at the Monticello Railway Museum in Monticello, Illinois.		

=== CF7 ===
Photograph	Works No.	Locomotive	Build date	Model	Former operators	Retire date	Disposition and location	Notes	References
	7746	Santa Fe 2571	June 1949	CF7	Atchison, Topeka and Santa Fe Railway (ATSF); Los Angeles Junction Railway (LAJ)	-	Awaiting repairs at the Oklahoma Railway Museum in Oklahoma City, Oklahoma		
	8281	Santa Fe 2447	November 1949	CF7	Atchison, Topeka and Santa Fe Railway (ATSF); Texas Industries (TXIX)	-	Stored at the Museum of the American Railroad in Frisco, Texas		
	8289	Santa Fe 2524	November 1949	CF7	Atchison, Topeka and Santa Fe Railway (ATSF); Red River Valley and Western Railroad (RRVW); Texas Rock Crusher Railroad (TXR)	-	Owned at the Santa Cruz, Big Trees and Pacific Railway in Santa Cruz, California	To be used for freight service	
	8930	Santa Fe 2641	December 1949	CF7	Atchison, Topeka and Santa Fe Railway (ATSF)	-	Operational at the Santa Cruz, Big Trees and Pacific Railway in Santa Cruz, California		
	9581	Santa Fe 2546	March 1950	CF7	Atchison, Topeka and Santa Fe Railway (ATSF)	-	Operational at the Kentucky Railway Museum in New Haven, Kentucky		
	9599	Santa Fe 2472	April 1950	CF7	Atchison, Topeka and Santa Fe Railway (ATSF); Mosaic Company (IMCX); Kinder Morgan Coke (KMTX)	-	Operational at the Florida Railroad Museum in Parrish, Florida		
	13717	Santa Fe 2467	February 1951	CF7	Atchison, Topeka and Santa Fe Railway (ATSF); Red River Valley and Western Railroad (RRVW); Texas Rock Crusher Railroad (TXR)	-	Owned at the Santa Cruz, Big Trees and Pacific Railway in Santa Cruz, California	To be used for freight service	
	13719	Santa Fe 2600	February 1951	CF7	Atchison, Topeka and Santa Fe Railway (ATSF)	-	Operational at the Santa Cruz, Big Trees and Pacific Railway in Santa Cruz, California		
	18922	Santa Fe 2428	November 1953	CF7	Atchison, Topeka and Santa Fe Railway (ATSF); Texas Industries (TXIX)	-	Display at the Museum of the American Railroad in Frisco, Texas		

=== GP10 ===
Photograph	Works No.	Locomotive	Build date	Model	Former operators	Retire date	Disposition and location	Notes	References
	19259	Florida Railroad Museum 8330	April 1954	GP10	Union Pacific Railway (UP); Illinois Central Railroad (IC); Illinois Central Gulf (ICG); Gulf and Ohio Railways (G&O)	-	Awaiting repairs at the Florida Railroad Museum in Parrish, Florida		

=== GP11 ===
Photograph	Works No.	Locomotive	Build date	Model	Former operators	Retire date	Disposition and location	Notes	References
	23724	Illinois Central 8701	September 1957	GP11	Union Pacific Railway (UP); Illinois Central Railroad (IC); Illinois Central Gulf (ICG)	-	Static display at the Illinois Central Station in Carbondale, Illinois		
	25038	Illinois Central 8733	December 1958	GP11	Illinois Central Railroad (IC); Illinois Central Gulf (ICG); Canadian National Railway (CN)	-	Operational at the Monticello Railway Museum in Monticello, Illinois		

== Electric ==
=== AEM-7 ===
Photograph	Works No.	Locomotive	Build date	Model	Former operators	Retire date	Disposition and location	Notes	References
	776073-16	Amtrak 915	January 1981	AEM-7	Amtrak (AMTK)		On display at the Railroad Museum of Pennsylvania in Strasburg, Pennsylvania		
	776073-18	Amtrak 917	1981	AEM-7	Amtrak (AMTK)		On display at the Danbury Railway Museum in Danbury, Connecticut		
	776073-28	Amtrak 927	1981	AEM-7	Amtrak (AMTK)		Owned by the Northeast Rail Heritage, Inc. (NRHI)		
	806004-16	Amtrak 945	April 1982	AEM-7	Amtrak (AMTK)		On display at the Illinois Railway Museum in Union, Illinois		

== Formerly preserved, scrapped ==
=== SW1 ===
Photograph	Works No.	Locomotive	Build date	Model	Former operators	Retire date	Last seen	Scrap date	Notes	References
	1039	Milwaukee Road 1613	March 1940	SW1	Milwaukee Road (MILW)		Indiana Transportation Museum, Noblesville, Indiana	July 4, 2018		

=== NW2 ===
Works No.	Locomotive	Build date	Model	Former operators	Retire date	Last seen	Scrap date	Notes	References
7328	Southern Pacific 1303	June 1949	NW2E	Texas and New Orleans Railroad (T&NO); Southern Pacific Railroad (SP)		Galveston Railroad Museum, Galveston, Texas	2012	Severely water damaged by Hurricane Ike on September 13, 2008	

=== GP9 ===
Photograph	Works No.	Locomotive	Build date	Model	Former operators	Retire date	Last seen	Scrap date	Notes	References
	19874	Great Smoky Mountains 777	September 1954	GP9R	Union Pacific Railroad (UP); Chicago and North Western Transportation Company (C&NW); Railway Equipment Leasing Company (RELCO)	December 20, 1989 (C&NW); December 2022 (GSMR)	Great Smoky Mountains Railroad in Bryson City, North Carolina	2022	Destroyed in staged train wreck	

=== SD7 ===
Photograph	Works no.	Locomotive	Build date	Model	Former operators	Retire date	Last seen	Scrap date	Notes	References
	16941	Dakota Southern 512	June 1952	SD7	Milwaukee Road (MILW); Dakota Southern Railway (DSRC)	-	Chamberlain, South Dakota	December 2023		
	17124	Oregon Eastern 6083	March 1953	SD7	Fort Worth and Denver Railway (FW&D); Burlington Northern Railroad (BN); Iowa Railroad Company (IRRC); Wyoming and Colorado Railroad (WYCO)	July 1983	Saratoga, Wyoming	2007		
	18308	Dakota Southern 522	October 1953	SD7	Milwaukee Road (MILW); Dakota Southern Railway (DSRC)	-	Chamberlain, South Dakota	November 14, 2021		

=== SD9 ===
Photograph	Works no.	Locomotive	Build date	Model	Former operators	Retire date	Last seen	Scrap date	Notes	References
	18777	Dakota Southern 506	January 1954	SD9	Milwaukee Road (MILW); Dakota Southern Railway (DSRC)	-	Chamberlain, South Dakota	October 15, 2021		
	19452	Southern Pacific 4450	April 1954	SD9E	Southern Pacific Transportation Company (SP); Union Pacific Railroad (UP)	March 26, 1997	Western Pacific Railroad Museum in Portola, California	August 20, 2013		
	22808	Royal Gorge 5305	July 1957	SD9	Denver and Rio Grande Western Railroad (D&GRW); Northwestern Pacific Railroad (NWP); OmniTRAX (OMLX)	December 1992	Cañon City, Colorado	October 2012		

=== SD18 ===
Works no.	Locomotive	Build date	Model	Former operators	Retire date	Last seen	Scrap date	Notes	References
27608	VLIX 7310	January 1963	SD18	Chesapeake and Ohio Railway (C&O); Chessie System (C&O); Indiana Railroad (INRD); Vintage Locomotives, Inc. (VLIX)	-	Oak Ridge, Tennessee	March 21, 2009		

=== SD45 ===
Works no.	Locomotive	Build date	Model	Former operators	Retire date	Last seen	Scrap date	Notes	References
34396	Reading Blue Mountain and Northern 3200	March 1969	SD45R	Southern Pacific Transportation Company (SP); Reading Blue Mountain and Northern Railroad (RBM&N)	June 20, 2001	Reading Blue Mountain and Northern Railroad in Port Clinton, Pennsylvania	November 2011		

=== SD50 ===
Works no.	Locomotive	Build date	Former operators	Retire date	Last seen	Scrap date	Notes	References
847008-30	Reading Blue Mountain and Northern 5029	December 1984	Missouri Pacific Railroad (MP); Union Pacific Railroad (UP); Reading Blue Mountain and Northern Railroad (RBM&N)	July 12, 2001	Reading Blue Mountain and Northern Railroad in Port Clinton, Pennsylvania	2018	Cab used for RB&N 3054	
847008-41	Reading Blue Mountain and Northern 5040	December 1984	Missouri Pacific Railroad (MP); Union Pacific Railroad (UP); Reading Blue Mountain and Northern Railroad (RBM&N)	October 31, 2000	Reading Blue Mountain and Northern Railroad in Port Clinton, Pennsylvania	2001		

== See also ==
- List of preserved GMD locomotives
