= Frankfort and Cincinnati Railroad =

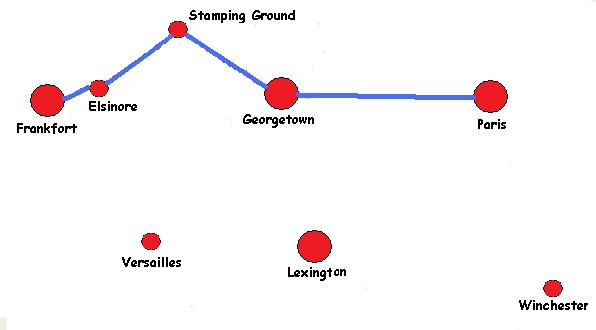
- Route of the Frankfort and Cincinnati Railroad

Overview
- Locale: Kentucky, USA
- Dates of operation: 1888–1985
- Predecessor: Kentucky Midland Railway

Technical
- Track gauge: 4 ft 8 1/2 in (1,435 mm)
- Length: 40.8 mi (65.7 km)

The Frankfort and Cincinnati Railroad is a defunct shortline railroad based in Kentucky. Despite its name, it had no connections with Cincinnati, Ohio.

The Frankfort and Cincinnati Railroad ran between Frankfort, Kentucky, and Paris, Kentucky, with a major stop in Georgetown, Kentucky; a distance of 40 miles (64 km). It was at Georgetown that it crossed the Southern Railway.

== Early days ==
The Frankfort and Cincinnati Railroad was originally known as the Kentucky Midland Railway. Construction of the route began at Frankfort in the early months of 1888, and reached Georgetown in June 1889, and Paris in January 1890. Some of the route laid upon the Buffalo Trace. The total cost of the construction was over $500,000. Its name changed to the Frankfort and Cincinnati Railroad in 1899. There were efforts to extend the route to Mount Sterling, Kentucky, and Alton, Kentucky, but it never happened. The total length of the railroad was 40.8 miles (65.7 km).

When it started, the Frankfort and Cincinnati Railroad had "serious financial reverses" before it even laid its first piece of rail. It even went into receivership in 1894. But by 1899 it was touted as a major factor in the stimulation of Frankfort's 1890s growth. The route between Georgetown and Paris helped distribute the local fine Bourbon whiskey to markets. On October 28, 1909, the F&C was almost purchased by the Louisville and Nashville Railroad (L&N), but the Kentucky Railroad Commission objected and the sale was annulled on April 22, 1912. In January 1927 the railroad was sold in public auction, with its owners a collection of citizens of Frankfort and Lexington, Kentucky.

== End of the railroad ==
On December 31, 1952, the Frankfort and Cincinnati Railroad abandoned passenger service, as the advent of wide-scale automobile usage made passenger trains unprofitable. The Cardinal broke an axle on Christmas Eve, and for the last week of passenger service the F&C Superintendent A.E. Parker used his own sedan to transport what few passengers the F&C still had from Frankfort to Paris.

In 1961 the company was purchased by Pinsly Railroad Company group of shortlines. The line between Georgetown and Paris was abandoned by the F&C in 1967; pressure by bourbon manufacturers kept the rest of the line active. The Interstate Commerce Commission allowed the F&C to abandon more of the line, reducing the line to Frankfort to Elsinore, Kentucky. The railroad had shrunk so much that by 1984, it did not own any freight cars, and maintained only one interchange at Frankfort with the L&N. A trestle bridge was damaged by a derailment in 1985, and the F&C could not afford to fix the bridge, leaving the F&C to close. By 1987 all the rails of the F&C were removed.

The Cardinal was eventually placed on the National Register of Historic Places in 1998. It is currently at the Kentucky Railway Museum in New Haven, Kentucky.

== See also ==
- Frankfort and Cincinnati Model 55 Rail Car
