= New Sherwood Hotel =

- U.S. National Register of Historic Places
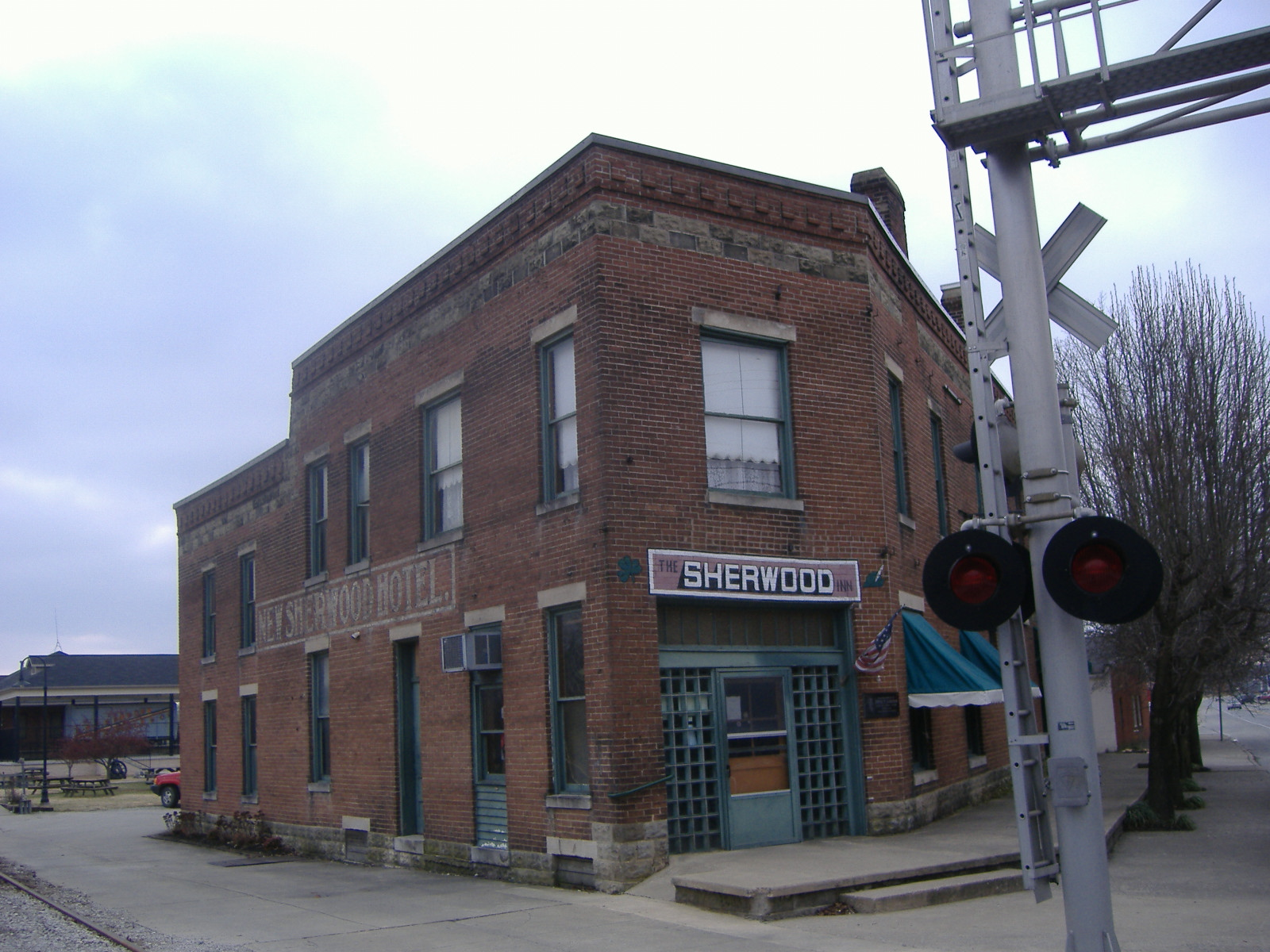
- Front view of the New Sherwood Hotel

- Location within Kentucky Location within the United States
- Location: 138 South Main Street, New Haven, Kentucky
- Coordinates: 37°39′26″N 85°35′37″W
- Built: 1914
- Architect: Johnson, W.F.; Hizer, Charlie
- Architectural style: Late 19th And Early 20th Century American Movements
- NRHP reference No.: 92000291
- Added to NRHP: March 26, 1992

The New Sherwood Hotel is a historic property on the National Register of Historic Places in New Haven, Kentucky, in southernmost Nelson County, Kentucky. It is next door to the Kentucky Railway Museum on U.S. 31E.

The brick, two-story New Sherwood Hotel is one of the few buildings left in New Haven that has any historical integrity; only nine buildings built 1880-1940 remained in New Haven by 1978. It is made of "solid-masonry-brickwall" on top of a limestone foundation. A two-tiered porch was intended for the hotel but never built, but the front facade has a series of iron cleats intended for use with the porches. A private residence for the hotel's owners is in the rear of the ground floor; the kitchen was for use to feed guests and the owners. The hotel rooms featured odd geometric angles and natural sunlight for all rooms. In the bar room there is a "massive" oak and mahogany back-bar and counter that was originally used in Louisville's old Greenstreet Saloon; it was placed in New Haven after the nearby town of Boston, Kentucky voted to be a "dry" town.

The New Sherwood Hotel replaced the previous Johnson Hotel/Sherwood Hotel, which burned down in 1913; it was placed on the same property, next to where the major road crossed the train track. The fact that the hotel was of masonry and concrete was to ward against future fires. It was also designed in a manner more fitting for larger cities like Louisville and Lexington, Kentucky; not small towns like New Haven. The heyday of the hotel was from when it was built in 1914 to the year 1932, at the height of the Great Depression. The Louisville and Nashville Railroad, which controlled the track by the New Sherwood Hotel, stopped service to the station in 1954. The owners in 1992 were descendants of the original owner; six Johnsons bought control of the hotel from the other co-owner Johnsons. It was restored for the benefit of visitors to the next door Kentucky Railway Museum.

It was placed on the National Register on March 26, 1992.

== Gallery ==
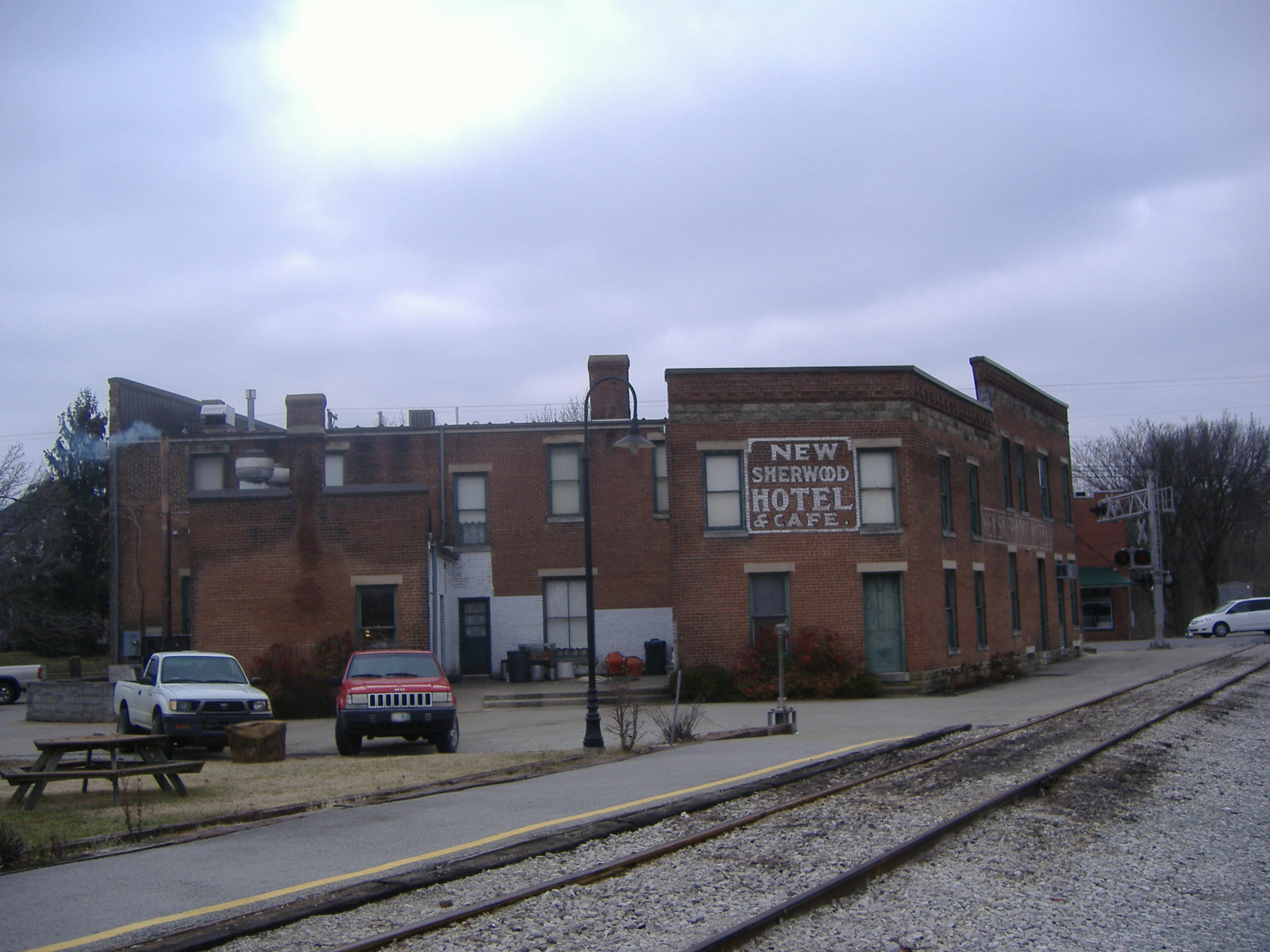
Back of hotel

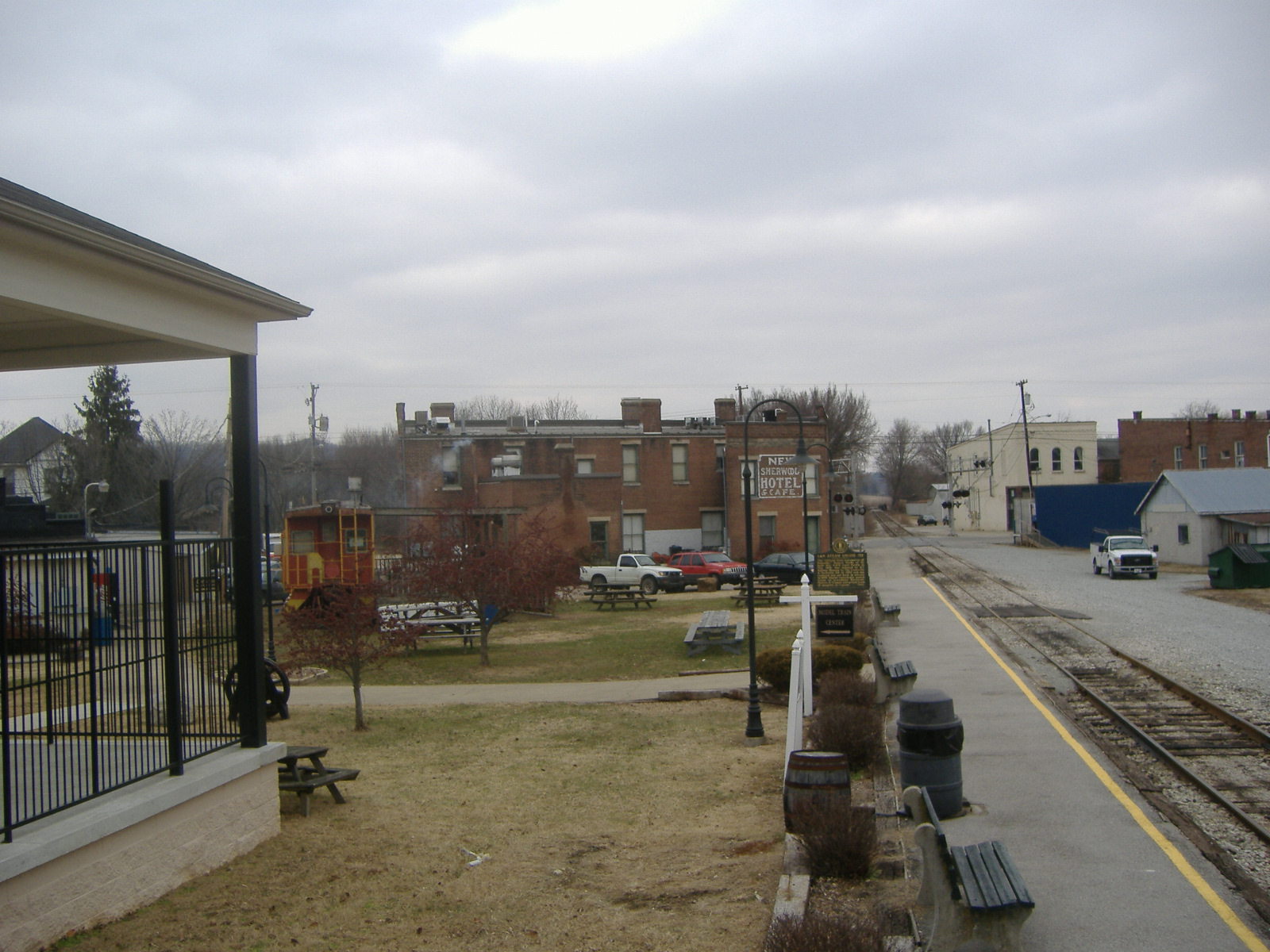
View of back lot hotel from the Kentucky Railway Museum
