= List of preserved GMD locomotives =

A number of locomotives constructed by General Motors Diesel (GMD) have been preserved in museums, on tourist railroads, and various other locations across the world. Each locomotive is listed by serial number.

== Switchers ==
=== GMD1 ===
Photograph	Works no.	Locomotive	Build date	Model	Former operators	Retire date	Disposition and location	Notes	References
	A1432	Canadian National 1012	1958	GMD1	Canadian National Railway (CN)	-	Operational at the Waterloo Central Railway (WCR) in St. Jacobs, Ontario		
	A1449	Canadian National 1900	September 1958	GMD1	Canadian National Railway (CN)	-	On static display at the Winnipeg Railway Museum (WRM) in Winnipeg, Manitoba		
	A1708	Oregon Pacific 1413	January 1959	GMD1	Canadian National Railway (CN)	-	Operational at the Oregon Pacific Railroad (OPR) in Portland, Oregon		
	A1830	Northern Alberta 302	December 1959	GMD1	Northern Alberta Railways (NAR); Canadian National Railway (CN)	-	On static display at the Alberta Railway Museum (ARM) in Edmonton, Alberta		

== General Purpose locomotives (GP) ==
=== GP9 ===
Photograph	Serial no.	Locomotive	Build date	Model	Former operators	Retire date	Disposition and location	Notes	References
	A1083	APXX 7438	April 1957	GP9	New York Central Railroad (NYC); Penn Central (PC); Conrail (CR); RailAmerica Central Western Railway Corporation (CWRL)	-	Operational at the Alberta Prairie Railway Excursions (APXX) at Stettler, Alberta		
	A1091	BNSF 1685	March 1957	GP9	Burlington Northern (Manitoba) Limited (BN); BNSF Railway (BNSF)	-	Operational at the Prairie Dog Central Railway(PDCR), Winnipeg, Manitoba	"torpedo boat" version	
	A714	Canadian Pacific 8250	December 1954	GP9u	Canadian Pacific Railway (CP); Larry's Truck and Electric (LTEX)	April 28, 2015	Operational at the Potomac Eagle Scenic Railroad (PESX) in Romney, West Virginia		
	A1297	Canadian National 4019	November 1957	GP9RM	Canadian National Railway (CN); British Columbia Institute of Technology (BCIT)	2005	Donated to the Alberta Railway Museum (ARM) in Edmonton, Alberta		

== Freight cab units (F) ==
=== F7 ===
Photograph	Works no.	Locomotive	Build date	Model	Former operators	Retire date	Disposition and location	Notes	References
	A139	Wabash 671	March 1951	F7A	Wabash Railroad (WAB); Norfolk and Western Railway (N&W)	October 2, 1978	On static display at the Mad River and Nickel Plate Museum (MR&NKPM) in Bellevue, Ohio		
	A487	Wabash 1189	April 1953	F7A	Wabash Railroad (WAB); Norfolk and Western Railway (N&W)	September 18, 1979	Operational at the Monticello Railway Museum in Monticello, Illinois		

=== FP7 ===
Photograph	Works no.	Locomotive	Build date	Model	Former operators	Retire date	Disposition and location	Notes	References
	A242	Canadian Pacific 4038	September 1951	FP7A	Canadian Pacific Railway (CP)	December 1982	On static display in Minnedosa, Manitoba		
	A370	Canadian Pacific 4069	August 1952	FP7A	Canadian Pacific Railway (CP); Via Rail (VIA)	-	Operational at the Railway Museum of British Columbia (WCRA) in Squamish, British Columbia		
Algoma Central Railway No. 1404 - September 2018 - 01	A524	Algoma Central Railway 1404	June 1953	FP7A	Canadian Pacific Railway (CP); Via Rail (VIA); Algoma Central Railway (AC)	-	On static display at the Railway Museum of British Columbia (WCRA) in Squamish, British Columbia		

=== FP9 ===
Photograph	Works no.	Locomotive	Build date	Model	Former operators	Retire date	Disposition and location	Notes	References
	A1050	Canadian National 6520	March 1957	FP9A	Canadian National Railway (CN); Via Rail (VIA); Waterloo–St. Jacobs Railway (WSJR)	-	Operational at the Railway Museum of British Columbia (WCRA) in Squamish, British Columbia.		
	A1051	Texas State Railroad 125	March 1957	FP9ARM	Canadian National Railway (CN); Via Rail (VIA); Georgia Southwestern Railroad (GSWR)	-	Operational at the Texas State Railroad (TSR) in Palestine, Texas.		
	A1196	Via Rail 6300	April 1957	FP9ARM	Canadian National Railway (CN); Via Rail (VIA)	-	Operational at the Heber Valley Railroad (HVRX) in Heber City, Utah.		
	A1203	Potomac Eagle Scenic 1755	May 1957	FP9A	Canadian National Railway (CN); Via Rail (VIA); Algoma Central Railway (AC); Pioneer Rail Corporation (PREX)	-	Operational at the Potomac Eagle Scenic Railroad (PESX) in Romney, West Virginia.		

== Special Duty locomotives (SD) ==
=== SD40 ===
Photograph	Works no.	Locomotive	Build date	Former operators	Retire date	Disposition and location	Notes	References
	A2133	Canadian Pacific 5500	July 1966	Canadian Pacific Railway	2001	On static display at the Revelstoke Railway Museum (RRWM) in Revelstoke, British Columbia		
	A2594	Canadian National 5232	November 1971	Canadian National Railway; Athabasca Northern Railway; Cando Contracting Limited	-	Under ownership of the Vintage Locomotive Society (VLSX) in Winnipeg, Manitoba		

=== SD40-2 ===
Photograph	Serial no.	Locomotive	Build date	Model	Former operators	Retire date	Disposition and location	Notes	References
	A2576	Canadian Pacific 5577	March 1972	SD40-2	Canadian Pacific Railway (CP); Pennsylvania Northeastern Railroad (PN)	February 2006	Operational on the New Hope Railroad (NHRR) in New Hope, Pennsylvania		
	A3670	Canadian Pacific 5903	December 1978	SD40-2	Canadian Pacific Railway (CP)	2018	On static display at ExpoRail in Saint-Constant, Quebec		

== Narrow gauge ==
=== G8 ===
Photograph	Works no.	Locomotive	Build date	Model	Former operators	Retire date	Disposition and location	Notes	References
	A926	Canadian National 803	July 1956	G8	Canadian National Railway (CN)	-	Display at the Carbonear Railway Museum in Carbonear, Newfoundland and Labrador		
	A928	Canadian National 805	July 1956	G8	Canadian National Railway (CN)	-	Static display at Canadian Railway Museum in Saint-Constant, Quebec		

=== NF-110 ===
Photograph	Works no.	Locomotive	Build date	Model	Former operators	Retire date	Disposition and location	Notes	References
	A303	Canadian National 900	December 1952	NF110	Newfoundland Railway (NFLD); Canadian National Railway (CN)	-	Display at the Clarenville Heritage Museum in Clarenville, Newfoundland and Labrador		
	A305	Canadian National 902	December 1952	NF110	Newfoundland Railway (NFLD); Canadian National Railway (CN)	-	Display at the Lewisporte Train Park in Loon Bay, Newfoundland and Labrador		
	A438	Canadian National 906	February 1953	NF110	Newfoundland Railway (NFLD); Canadian National Railway (CN)	-	Display at the Railway Coastal Museum in St. John's, Newfoundland and Labrador		

== Electric ==
=== GF6C ===
Photograph	Works No.	Locomotive	Build date	Model	Former operators	Retire date	Disposition and location	Notes	References
	A4304	BC Rail 6001	November 1983	GF6C	BC Rail (BCOL)	2000	On display at the Central BC Railway and Forestry Museum in Prince George, British Columbia		

== Formerly preserved, scrapped ==
Photograph	Works no.	Locomotive	Build date	Model	Former operators	Retire date	Last seen	Scrap date	Cause of scrapping	Notes	References
	A175	Ontario Northland 1501	March 1951	FP7A	Ontario Northland Railway (ONT)	1996	North Bay, Ontario	2008	Poor condition		

== See also ==
- List of preserved EMD locomotives
