= Dinwiddie County Pullman Car =

Dinwiddie County 10-section lounge
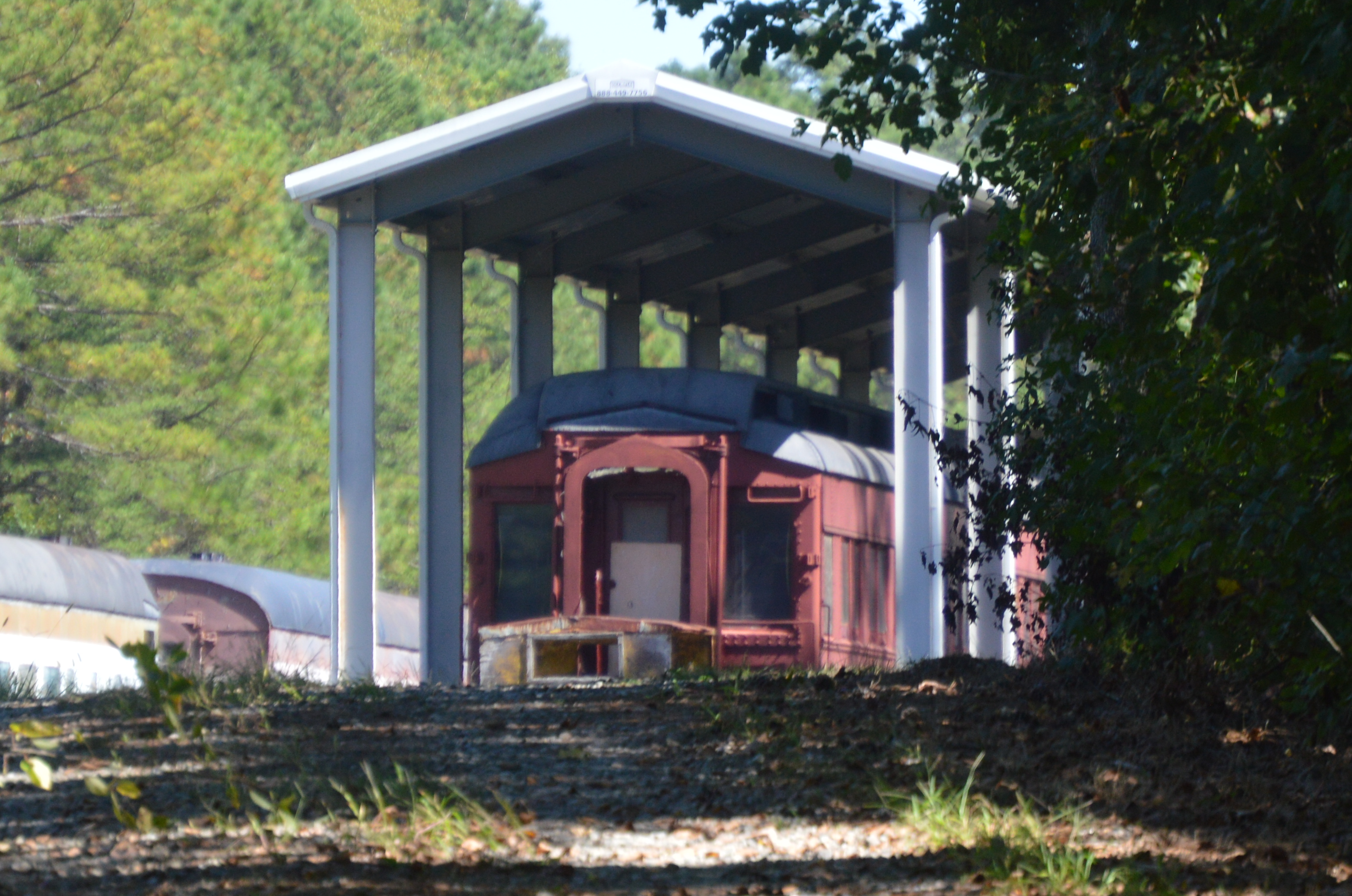
- Distant view from nearby roadway
- Manufacturer: Pullman
- Order no.: Lot 4998
- Constructed: 1926
- Diagram: Pullman Plan 3521A; later 3521F
- Capacity: 20 in 10 sections 12 (later 14) lounge seats
- Operators: Pullman Company; National Railway Historical Society

Specifications
- Auxiliaries: 32 volt
- HVAC: Mechanical
- Bogies: Type 2410A
- Braking system: Type UC
- Track gauge: 4 ft 8 1/2 in (1,435 mm)
- Dinwiddie County Pullman Car
- U.S. National Register of Historic Places
- Virginia Landmarks Register
- Location within Virginia Location within the United States
- Location: Hallsboro Yard, northeast of the junction of VA 606 and VA 671, Midlothian, Virginia
- Coordinates: 37°28′59″N 77°44′10″W
- Area: less than one acre
- Built by: Pullman Co.
- NRHP reference No.: 91000834
- VLR No.: 020-0023

Significant dates
- Added to NRHP: July 3, 1991
- Designated VLR: April 17, 1991

Dinwiddie County Pullman Car is a historic Pullman car located near Midlothian, Chesterfield County, Virginia. It was built in 1926 as the Mt. Angeles by the Pullman Company, one of thirty cars on Lot 4998, all to Plan 3521A. It is a heavyweight, all-steel sleeping car with ten sections and one observation lounge. In June 1934 Pullman rebuilt it to Plan 3521F and changed the name of the car to Dinwiddie and again in April 1937 the name was changed to Dinwiddie County, which name it retains to this day. These name changes represent the car's transfer to service on the Norfolk and Western Railway's trains operating to and from Virginia.

The car was sold to the National Railway Historical Society in 1965. It appeared in the 1976 television movie Eleanor and Franklin as the funeral car for Franklin Delano Roosevelt.

It was listed on the National Register of Historic Places in 1991.

== See also ==
- Mt. Broderick Pullman Car – another car from the same Lot, that had a different refurbishment.
