= Kentucky Railway Museum =

Railroad museum in New Haven, Kentucky, US

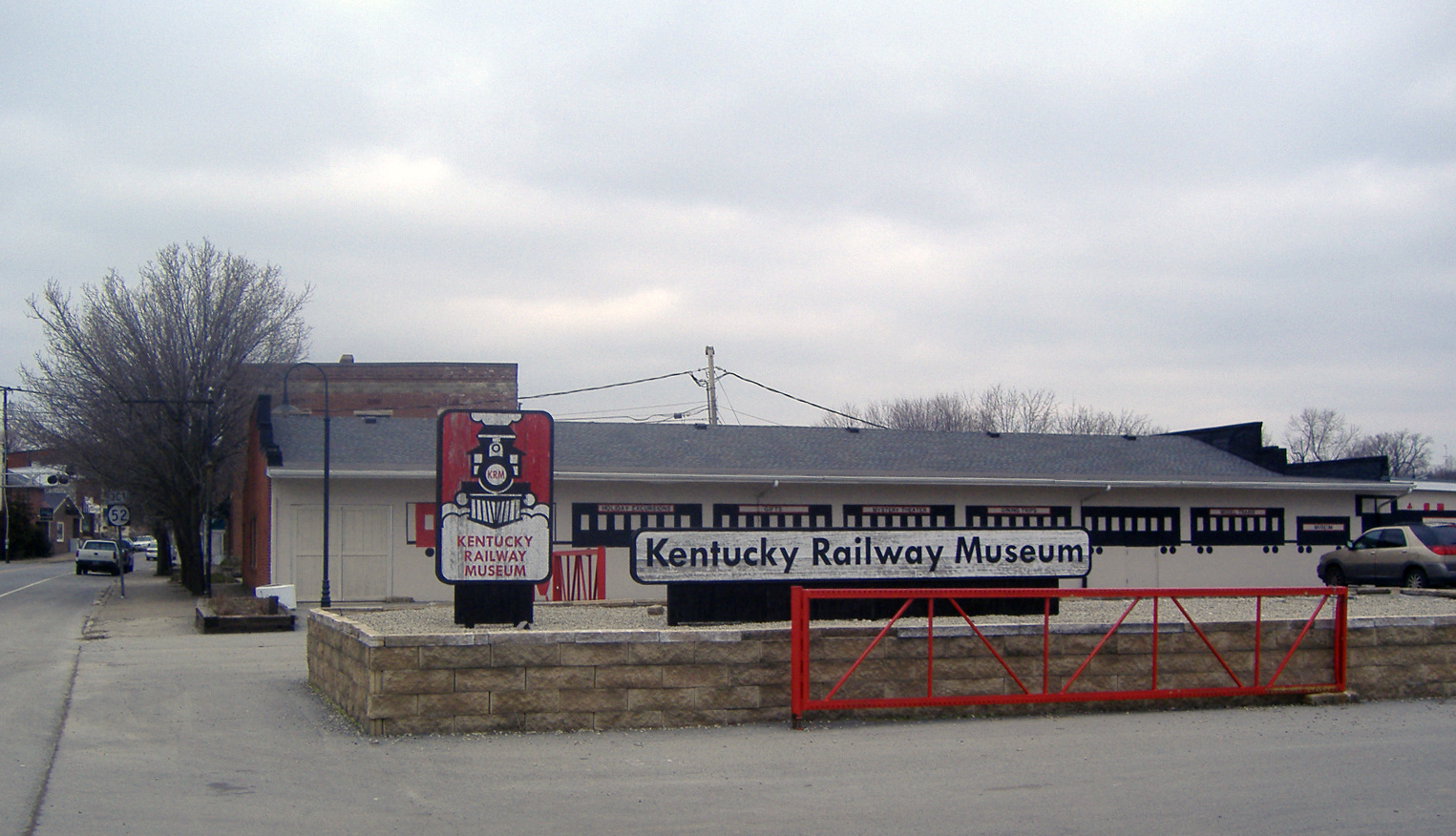
- Entrance to the museum facility

- Location within Kentucky Location within the United States
- Established: 1954
- Location: New Haven, Kentucky, United States
- Coordinates: 37.655°N 85.591°W
- Type: Railroad
- Website: http://www.kyrail.org/

The Kentucky Railway Museum, now located in New Haven, Kentucky, United States, is a non-profit railroad museum dedicated to educating the public regarding the history and heritage of Kentucky's railroads and the people who built them. Originally created in 1954 in Louisville, Kentucky, the museum is at its third location, in extreme southern Nelson County. It is one of the oldest railroad stations in the United States.

The museum owns four steam locomotives, twelve diesel locomotives and over a hundred pieces of rolling stock. Four of the pieces are separately on the National Register of Historic Places: the Louisville and Nashville Steam Locomotive No. 152, the Louisville and Nashville Combine Car Number 665, the Mt. Broderick Pullman Lounge-Obs-Sleeping Car, and the Frankfort and Cincinnati Model 55 Rail Car.

== History ==
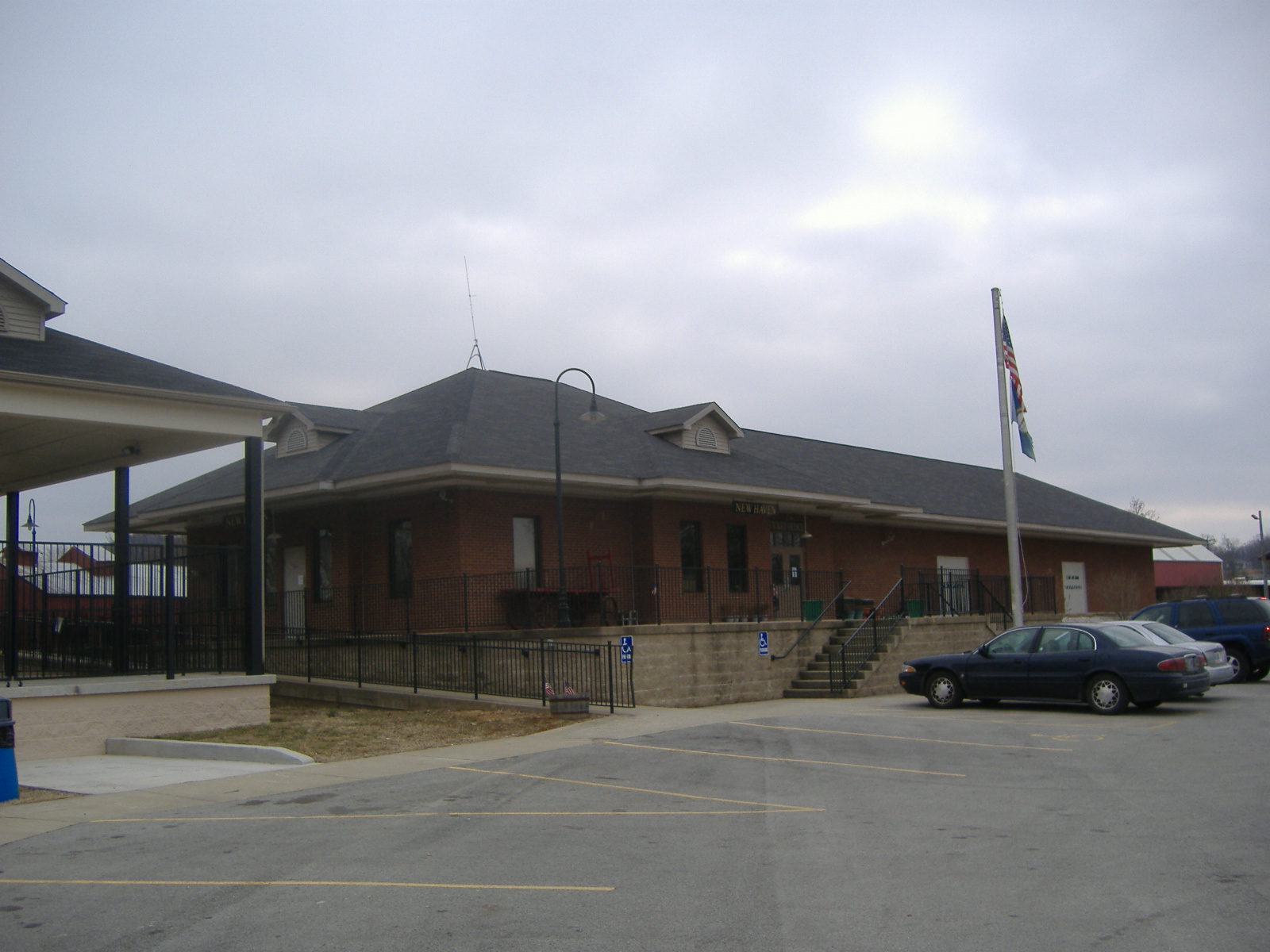
Replica of original New Haven depot

The site of the current museum was built by the Louisville and Nashville Railroad from 1856 to 1857, on their old line, which ran to Lebanon, Kentucky. The line was of vital importance to the Union cause, making it a frequent target of Confederate forces under John Hunt Morgan, and others, during the 1860s; the nearby bridge was even destroyed. The railroad station on the site now is a 1990s replica of the station which was built at the site in 1910.

The museum was chartered in 1954 by railroad enthusiasts from Louisville, through the Kentucky General Assembly, who wished to preserve steam locomotives and other rail paraphernalia. One of its very first displays was the Louisville and Nashville #152 locomotive, a caboose, and a wooden coach. These first donations, including railroad track, were from the Monon Railroad, and the Louisville and Nashville Railroad. The museum has moved twice since it was chartered, from its original location in Louisville. The first site was at 1837 East River Road, where the Louisville Soccer Fields are now located. This first location was 6 acres (2.4 ha) in size, and was fenced and lighted by the Louisville Parks Department. The site opened for the public on May 30, 1958, with its dedication taking place on September 30, 1957. The museum eventually left the first location because of flooding from the nearby Ohio River, and a general lack of necessary space. The worst of these floods was in March 1964.

In December 1975 it was decided to move the museum to a larger and safer location. The museum was moved in 1977 to the Ormsby Village area at the corner of La Grange Road and Dorsey Lane on land leased from Jefferson County, and known as Ormsby Station. The Louisville and Nashville #152 locomotive was left at River Road to be repaired. Ormsby Station was situated on 32 acres (13 ha). However, the county informed the museum that the lease would not be renewed in 1993; the land was in a highly-valuable commercial area.

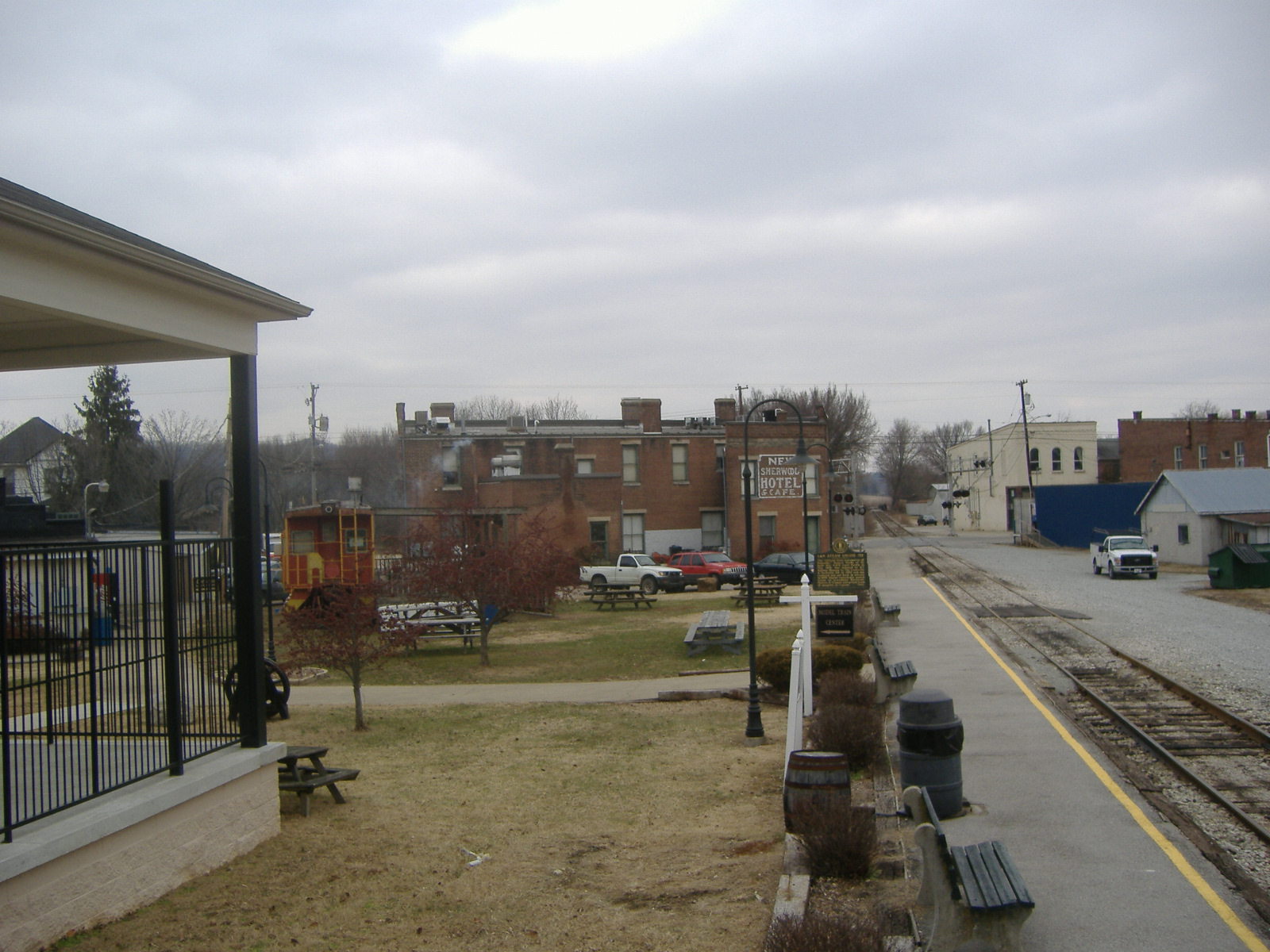
Looking out from the visitor center towards New Haven and the New Sherwood Hotel.

With the edict from Jefferson County, it became necessary to move to the current site in New Haven, which opened on July 4, 1990. The original New Haven location was 8 acres (3.2 ha), with a building, and was donated by Lewis and Chester Simms, two New Haven businessmen, along with their wives (Elizabeth Jo and Nora respectively). It used the last eighteen miles remaining of the Louisville and Nashville Railroad's old Lebanon line, then under the control of CSX Transportation, which had taken control of the Louisville and Nashville Railroad in the 1970s. Train excursions began at the New Haven site in May 1991. The move also inspired the renovation of the New Sherwood Hotel.

Many of the donations to move the museum from Louisville to New Haven were due to the efforts of Glenn Rutherford, a reporter for the Louisville Courier-Journal. During the fund raising for the move Rutherford told many stories regarding the trains at the museum. He was singularly honored for his efforts in November 2003.

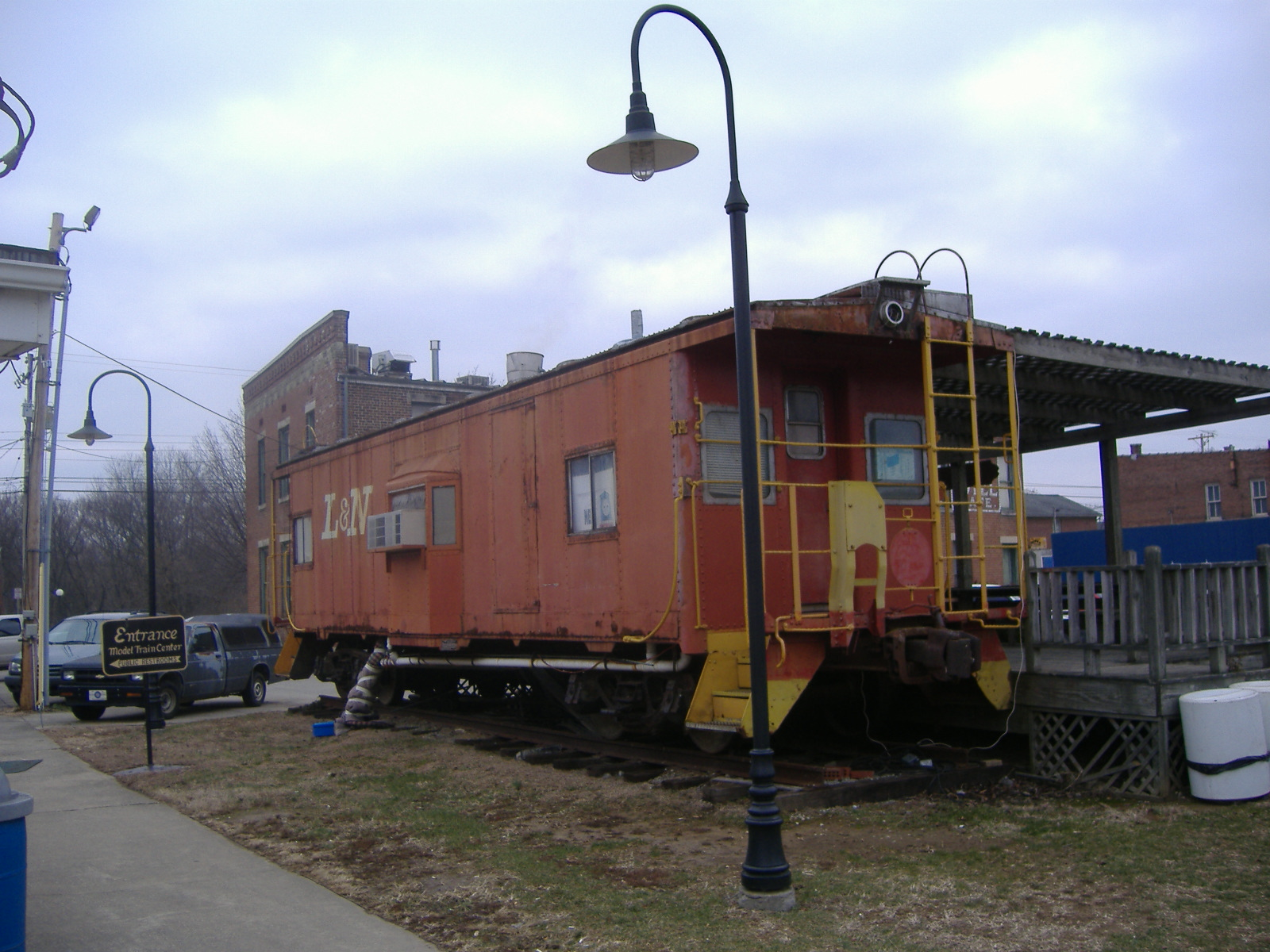
L&N Caboose

The Kentucky Railway Museum faced vandalism concerns in its new location. In June 1992 it became necessary to build a razor wire perimeter fence after three juveniles (of an average age of twelve) damaged several of the historic cars and trains. Rich Collins, then the museum director, worried about the facility looking "like Fort Knox or a penal colony".

In 1999 the Kentucky Railway Museum was given a grant by CSX Transportation to start a traveling exhibit.

There is one other heritage railroad in Nelson County: My Old Kentucky Dinner Train, which is based at the Old Louisville and Nashville Station in Bardstown, Kentucky.

== Attractions ==
Among the steam locomotives is Louisville and Nashville Railroad #152, a 4-6-2 Pacific style that is believed to be the last operating steam locomotive from the L&N. The museum operates a heritage railroad and offers excursion trains on selected weekends in summer and fall. The line is a portion of the L&N's former main line from Lebanon Junction to Corbin; the museum operates the segment from Boston to New Haven. There is a large model train layout and a gift shop at New Haven, in a brick building that is a replica of the former L&N depot there.

== Locomotives ==
The KRM currently owns 4 steam locomotives and 12 diesel locomotives, several of which are either under restoration or operational. You can see the full list below.

Steam Locomotives
Image	Locomotive	Manufacturer	Build Date	Wheel Arrangement	Status	Notes
	Louisville & Nashville #152	Rogers Locomotive Works	1905	4-6-2 Class: K-2A	Under restoration	Official state steam locomotive of Kentucky. On National Register of Historic Places. Out of service since 2011 and is currently undergoing FRA mandated 1,472-day inspection.
	Chesapeake & Ohio #2716	American Locomotive Company	1943	2-8-4 Class: K-4	Under restoration	On long-term lease to Kentucky Steam Heritage Corporation located in Ravenna, KY.
	Louisville & Nashville #2152	American Locomotive Company	1925	0-8-0 Class: USRA	Display	Underwent recent cosmetic restoration back to L&N livery; currently displayed.
	Louisville Cement Company #11	Vulcan Iron Works (Wilkes-Barre)	1923	0-4-0TT	Display	Cosmetically restored over previous few years. Now displayed at museum entrance. 39 and 1/2 inch gauge.

Diesel Locomotives
Image	Locomotive	Manufacturer	Build Date	Model	Status	Notes
	Louisville & Nashville #411	Electro-Motive Diesel	1953	GP-7	Operational	Originally built as Reading #615; repainted into basic black L&N freight scheme.
	CSX (Louisville & Nashville) #1103	Electro-Motive Diesel	1970	SW-1500	Operational	Donated by CSX in 2019. Locomotive will eventually be painted back into L&N colors.
	Santa Fe #2546	Electro-Motive Diesel	1949 Rebuilt 1973	CF-7	Operational	Originally built as F-7 #229L. Later rebuilt as a CF-7.
	Monon #32	Electro-Motive Diesel	1948	BL-2	Operational	Runs on limited occasions.
	Louisville & Nashville #770	Electro-Motive Diesel	1942	E6A	Under cosmetic restoration	Empty shell, currently being cosmetically restored.
	Frankfort & Cincinnati	Brill Company	1927	Model 55-1	Stored	Stored in shed.
	Baltimore & Ohio #21	General Electric	1943	44-Ton Switcher	Operational	Built as USAF #1223
	Kentucky Utilities #1	General Electric	1956	45-Ton Switcher	Operational	Recently painted back to KU colors.
	Louisville Gas & Electric (LG&E) #1	General Electric	?	110-Ton Switcher	Stored	Donated to KRM just months before fire destroyed plant.
	Indiana Ammunition Plant #1038	Plymouth Locomotive Works	1940's	-	Operational	
	Indiana Ammunition Plant #????	Plymouth Locomotive Works	1940's	-	Display	
	Indiana Ammunition Plant #1032	Plymouth Locomotive Works	1940's	-	Operational; privately owned	

=== Locomotives ===
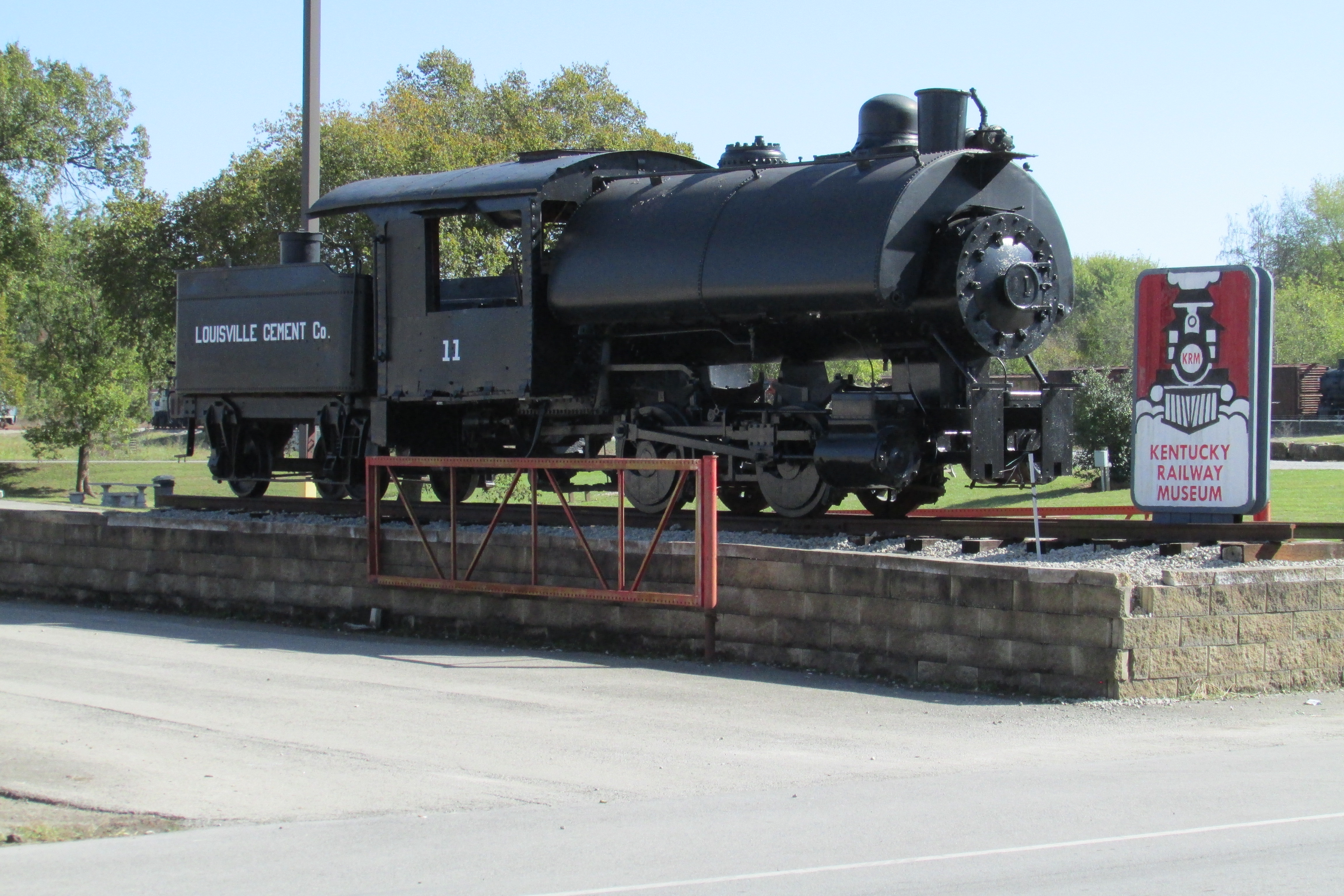
Louisville Cement locomotive #11

The old Louisville and Nashville Steam Locomotive #152 is one of the trains used to take passengers to Boston, Kentucky, and back. It was donated to the museum by Louisville and Nashville Railroad President William H. Kendall in 1957. It is the oldest known remaining 4-6-2 Pacific to exist. It is also the "Official State Locomotive of Kentucky", designated as such on March 6, 2000.

Another locomotive that dates back to the Kentucky Railway Museum's early days is Monon Route's Diesel Engine No. 32. It was painted black and gold by Monon, and kept as such, to match the school colors of Purdue University, located in West Lafayette, Indiana. It was purchased by Monon in 1948, and then acquired by the Louisville and Nashville Railroad in August 1971. It became a display at the museum in 1972.

Chesapeake and Ohio 2716 was formerly on display at the museum & is currently in Ravenna, KY where It'll be Restored to service. Having been originally donated in 1959 and restored to operation by other companies and organizations 4 times: in 1979 for Clinchfield’s Steam program until it was cancelled mid restoration, leaving 2716 to be sent back to New Haven in pieces. In 1980 when Southern leased it for use on its steam program from 1981 until 1982 when it was put into storage. In 1995 when the Fort Wayne Railroad Historical Society moved it to their shops and ran it in the summer of 1996, then retired it and sent it back to New Haven in 2001 to focus on the restoration of NKP 765. And then in 2019 when the Kentucky Steam Heritage Corp leased it and moved it to Ravenna, KY to restore it for operation, which they currently are still working on as of 2025.

=== Rail Cars ===
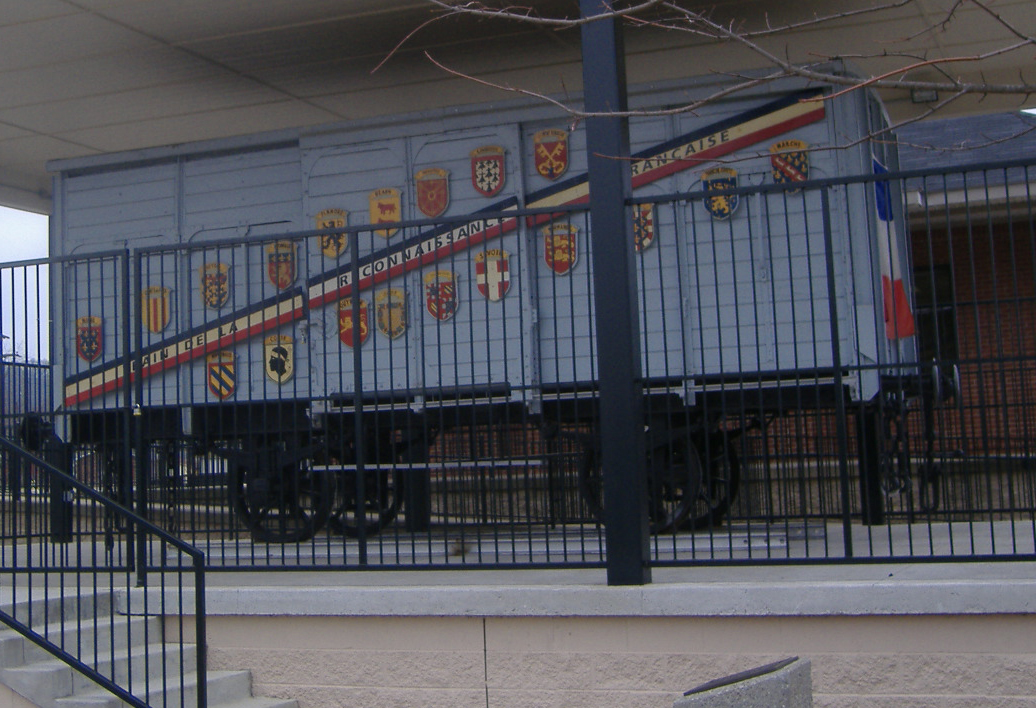
40 et 8 French freight car

Several historic rail cars are at the facility.

The Louisville and Nashville Combine Car Number 665 was one of only two "two wood side steel" train cars ever made. It was designed for the times of the Jim Crow laws; whichever end was the front during the trip would hold white passengers, while the rear held black passengers. It was given to the Kentucky Railway Museum by the Louisville and Nashville Railroad in 1958. During the Civil War Centennial observances of the 1960s this car was pulled by the famous Civil War-era steam locomotive The General, touring various parts of the Eastern U.S. rail network.

The Mt. Broderick Pullman Car was a four-star hotel on rails, with polished brass restroom fixtures, and pull out beds. The Pullman Company sold the car to the museum in 1958.

The other historic car at the facility on the National Register is the Frankfort and Cincinnati Model 55 Rail Car, also known as The Cardinal due to its red color. It is a gas-powered motor rail car that formerly ran the Frankfort and Cincinnati Railroad's "Whiskey Route" between Frankfort, Kentucky and Paris, Kentucky.

=== Excursions ===
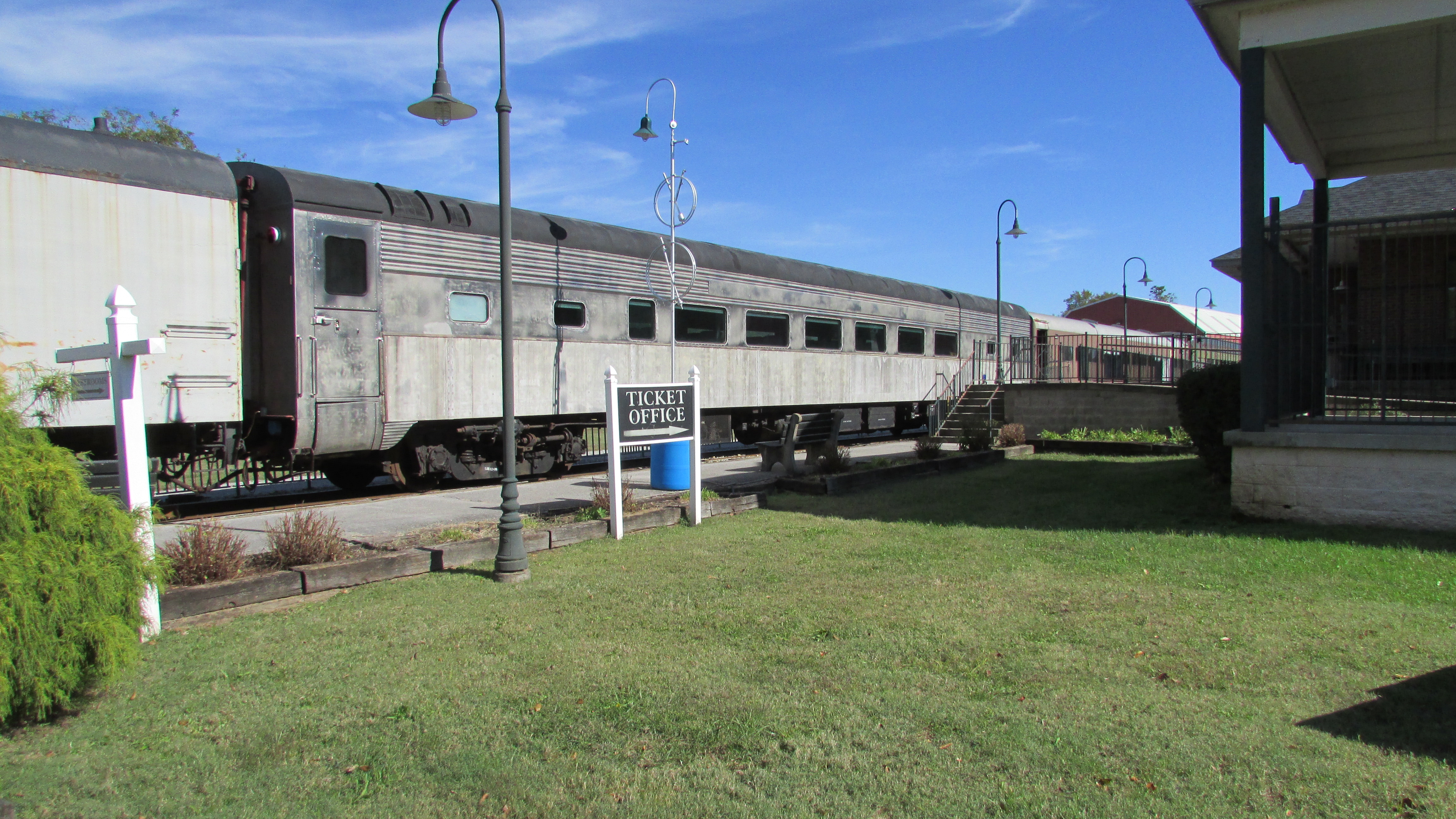
Excursion train

Train rides leave regularly from the museum to Boston, Kentucky, and back, with views of the Rolling Fork River Valley along the way. The train crosses roads fourteen times on a single one-way trip. The total trip is 22 miles (35 km) and lasts approximately one hour. At various times special excursions will involve themes such as train robberies, haunted trains, Easter Bunny, Santa Claus, and Thomas the Tank Engine.

=== Exhibits ===
One of the buildings at the facility holds a model train display. The model trains are in glass-covered dioramas, covering a total area of 3,000 square feet (280 m^{2}). Dioramas include a German-landscape featuring a village and carnival, and another depicting convicts working on placing rails.

== See also ==
- List of attractions and events in the Louisville metropolitan area
- List of heritage railroads in the United States
