= GE 110-ton switcher =

Type and origin
- Power type: Diesel-electric
- Builder: GE Transportation Systems
- Model: 110-ton switcher SL-110 from 1974 onwards
- Build date: December 1943-February 1974 (original 110-tonner); December 1974-1985 (SL 110)
Specifications
- Configuration
  - AAR: B-B
  - UIC: Bo′Bo′
- Gauge: 4 ft 8 1/2 in (1,435 mm) standard gauge
- Loco weight: 110 short tons (98 long tons; 100 t)
- Prime mover: 2 × Cummins
- Engine type: 2 Diesel engines

The GE 110-ton switcher is a diesel-electric locomotive model built by GE Transportation Systems. It was intended for use in light switching duties.
