= Louisville and Nashville Combine Car Number 665 =

- U.S. National Register of Historic Places
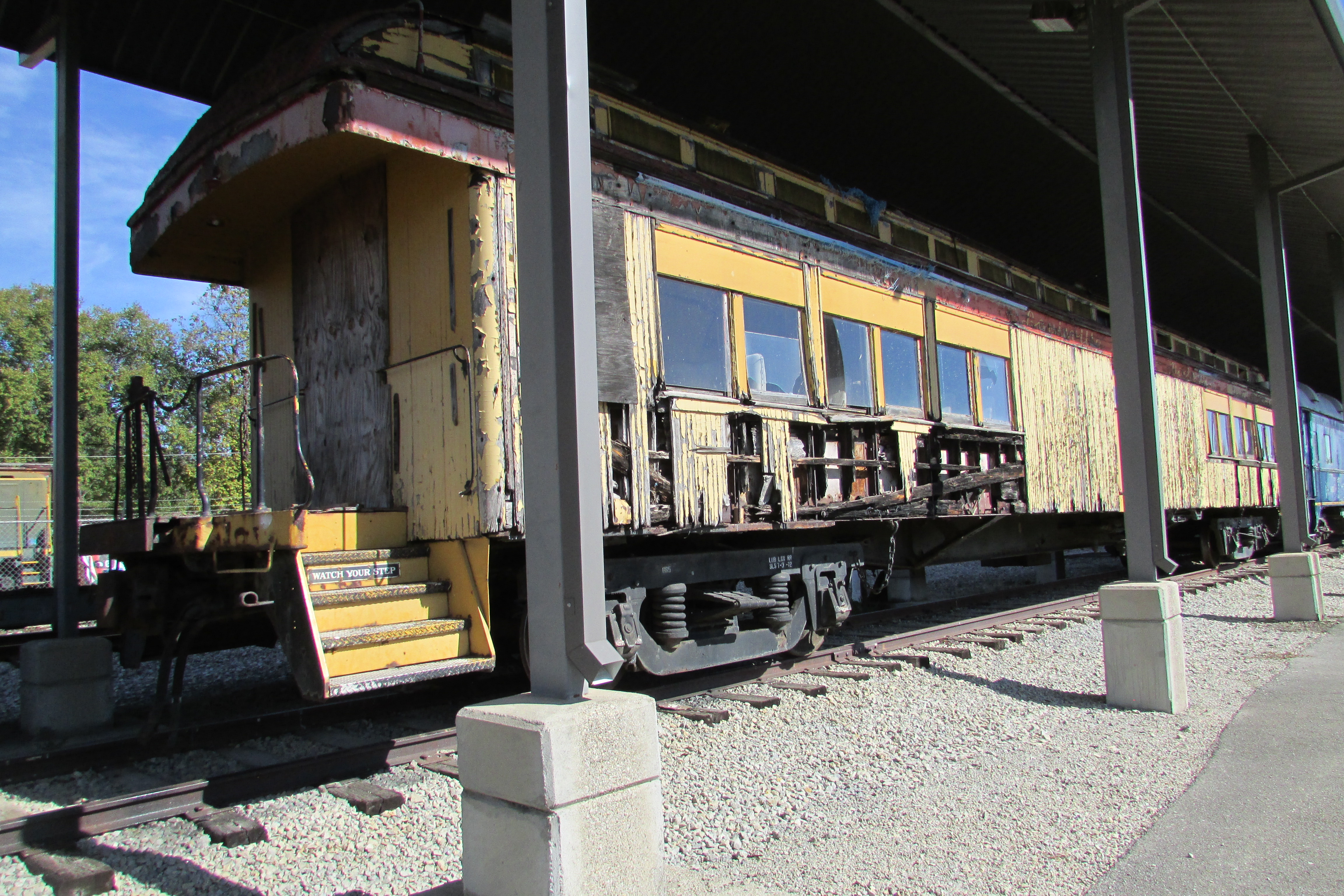
- L&N #665

- Location within Kentucky Location within the United States
- Location: 136 S. Main St., New Haven, Kentucky
- Coordinates: 37°39′25″N 85°35′33″W
- Built: 1913
- Architect: American Car and Foundry Company
- Architectural style: Railroad Car
- NRHP reference No.: 97001343
- Added to NRHP: November 19, 1997

The Louisville and Nashville Combine Car Number 665, also known as the "Jim Crow Car", is a historic railcar on the National Register of Historic Places, currently at the Kentucky Railway Museum at New Haven, Kentucky, in southernmost Nelson County, Kentucky.

The Combine car was built at the American Car and Foundry Company located in Jeffersonville, Indiana in 1913; a custom design given to it by the Louisville and Nashville Railroad. It was number 865, later numbered 665. It served at least three different branches of the L&N: Maysville Branch, Glasgow Branch, and Springfield Branch.

Its nickname, the "Jim Crow Car", relates to the Jim Crow laws of pre-1965 United States, which allowed for separate facilities for blacks under the policy of separate but equal. A law passed on May 24, 1892, called the Separate Coach Law, specifically declared that railroad passenger cars must be segregated. It is the only preserved two wood side steel car; one of only two ever made. The car is 77.5 feet (23.6 m) by 9.66 feet (2.94 m) and weighs 104,300 pounds (47,300 kg). It has a central baggage section separating two passenger sections. Each passenger section has a cast-iron stove and a bathroom. Waste from the bathrooms was deposited directly on the rails.

In 1919 the L&N was forced by law to have a separate coach for blacks; often white drunks would be placed in the black car instead of one of those for whites.

In 1958 the car was given to the Kentucky Railway Museum by the Louisville and Nashville Railroad.

When The General of Great Locomotive Chase fame was undergoing restoration in 1962 by the L&N, the Combine Car was hooked up to The General to test how well the engine was repaired. During the trips the Combine Car held several different artifacts related to the Chase for its passengers to admire.
