= Wisconsin Central =

Wisconsin Central may refer to:

- A predecessor of the Soo Line Railroad known by the names:
  - Wisconsin Central Railroad (1871–1899)
  - Wisconsin Central Railway (1897–1954), which also used the name "Wisconsin Central Railroad"
- Wisconsin Central Ltd., a regional railroad acquired by the Canadian National Railway in 2001
