= Louisville and Nashville 152 =

Preserved American 4-6-2 locomotive

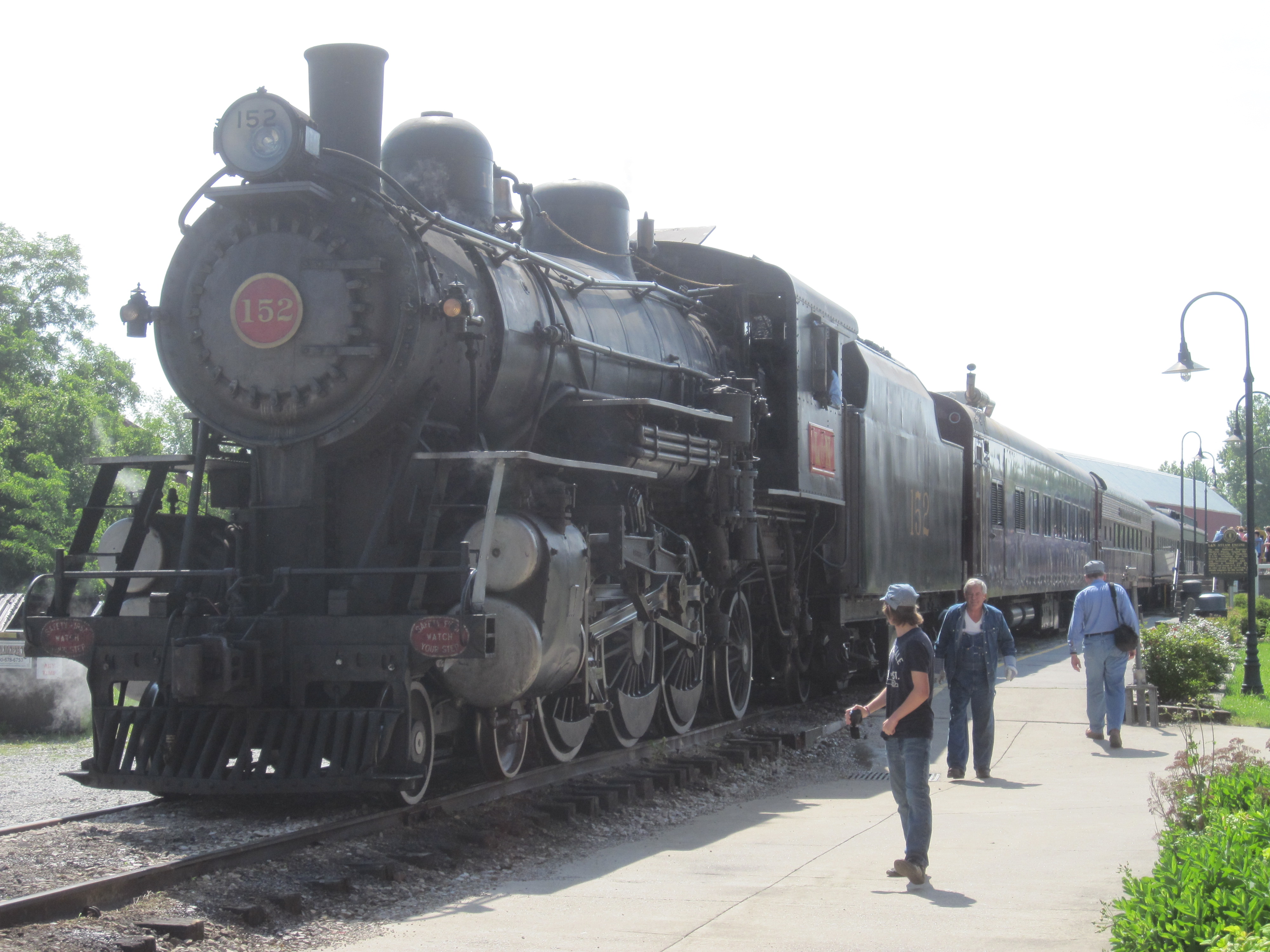
- L&N No. 152 at the Kentucky Railway Museum
Type and origin
- Power type: Steam
- Builder: Rogers Locomotive Works
- Serial number: 6256
- Build date: 1905
- Rebuild date: 1913
Specifications
- Configuration
  - Whyte: 4-6-2
  - UIC: 2′C1′
- Gauge: 4 ft 8 1/2 in (1,435 mm)
- Driver dia.: 69 in (1.753 m)
- Axle load: 42,000 lb (19.1 t)
- Loco weight: 187,800 lb (85.2 t)
- Tender weight: 143,400 lb (65.0 t)
- Total weight: 331,200 lb (150.2 t)
- Fuel type: Coal
- Fuel capacity: 15 t (14.8 long tons; 16.5 short tons)
- Water cap.: 7,000 US gal (26,000 L; 5,800 imp gal)
- Boiler pressure: 200 lbf/in^{2} (1.38 MPa)
- Cylinders: Two, outside
- Cylinder size: 20 in × 28 in (508 mm × 711 mm)
- Valve gear: Walschaerts
- Valve type: Piston valves
- Loco brake: Air
- Train brakes: Air
- Couplers: Knuckle
Performance figures
- Tractive effort: 27,600 lbf (122.77 kN)
Career
- Operators: Louisville and Nashville Railroad; Seaboard System; Norfolk Southern (leased); CSX (leased); Kentucky Railway Museum
- Class: New: K-1; Now: K-2A
- Number in class: 3rd of 25
- Numbers: L&N 152
- Retired: February 17, 1953
- Restored: September 1985
- Current owner: Kentucky Railway Museum
- Disposition: Undergoing major overhaul
- L & N Steam Locomotive No. 152
- U.S. National Register of Historic Places
- Location within Kentucky Location within the United States
- Location: Kentucky Railway Museum, US-31E, New Haven, Kentucky
- Coordinates: 37°39′25″N 85°35′33″W
- Built: 1905
- Architect: Rogers Locomotive Works
- NRHP reference No.: 74000883
- Added to NRHP: December 30, 1974

Louisville and Nashville 152 is a preserved K-2A class 4-6-2 "Pacific" type steam locomotive, built in 1905 by the Rogers Locomotive Works (RLW) for the Louisville and Nashville Railroad (L&N). It is listed on the National Register of Historic Places, and owned by the Kentucky Railway Museum (KRM) at New Haven, Kentucky in southernmost Nelson County, Kentucky. It is the oldest known remaining 4-6-2 "Pacific" type locomotive to exist. It is also the "Official State Locomotive of Kentucky", designated as such on March 6, 2000. Today, the locomotive is currently undergoing its FRA inspection and overhaul to return it to operating condition.

== History ==
No. 152 was built in 1905 at Paterson, New Jersey by the Rogers Locomotive Works (RLW), with 6256 as its Rogers Construction Number. The Louisville and Nashville Railroad (L&N) purchased No. 152 and four identical Pacifics at the cost of $13,406 apiece. Pleased with their five Pacifics, the L&N purchased forty more, which the Rogers Locomotive Works (by now owned by the American Locomotive Company) sold to the L&N between 1906 and 1910.

When more powerful locomotives were purchased by the L&N in the 1920s, the Pacifics were assigned to the Gulf Coast, a geographically flatter area. Railroad logs prove that No. 152 was one of the many "Pan American" passenger service. The No. 152 also pulled the car holding Al Capone on his way to Alcatraz. As time went on, No. 152 was used for less and less important routes. On February 17, 1953, the No. 152, the last surviving "K" class Pacific, was retired by the L&N, with its fate uncertain. During this time it was stored at Mobile, Alabama. L&N President John E. Tilford personally ordered the locomotive to not be cut up for scrap.

No. 152 was donated to the Kentucky Railway Museum (KRM), then located at 1837 East River Road in Louisville, Kentucky; it was one of the museum's first pieces. Restoration work on No. 152 officially began in 1972, after thirteen years of work, in September 1985, it was fired up for the first time in thirty-two years, thanks to funding by the National Park Service and the Brown Foundation. On April 26, 1986, the locomotive had entered its first excursion service run, pulling seven railcars with a total of 365 passengers. While being refurbished, it stayed at the River Road location when the rest of the museum moved to its new location at Ormsby Station. No. 152 would resume and continued to run on mainline excursion trains until 1988, when No. 152 was moved back to Kentucky. Since 1990, when the Kentucky Railway Museum moved to New Haven, Kentucky, it has operated on the museum's 17-mile remnant on the former L&N Lebanon Branch. It became the "Official State Locomotive of Kentucky" on March 6, 2000.

On September 10, 2011, No. 152 was withdrawn from service for the rest of the 2011 season due to boiler issues. On July 1, 2015, work officially began to return the engine to operating condition. The museum has invested $700,000 and needs an additional $400,000 to finish the rebuild.

== Sources ==
- Kleber, John E., ed. (2001). The Encyclopedia of Louisville. University Press of Kentucky. ISBN 0-8131-2100-0.
- Tagliarino, David (August 5, 1974). L & N Steam Locomotive No. 152 NRHP Nomination Form. National Railway Historical Society.
- Drury, George H. (1993). Guide to North American Steam Locomotives. Waukesha, Wisconsin: Kalmbach Publishing Company. pp. 228–230. ISBN 0-89024-206-2.
