= New Haven, Kentucky =

- City
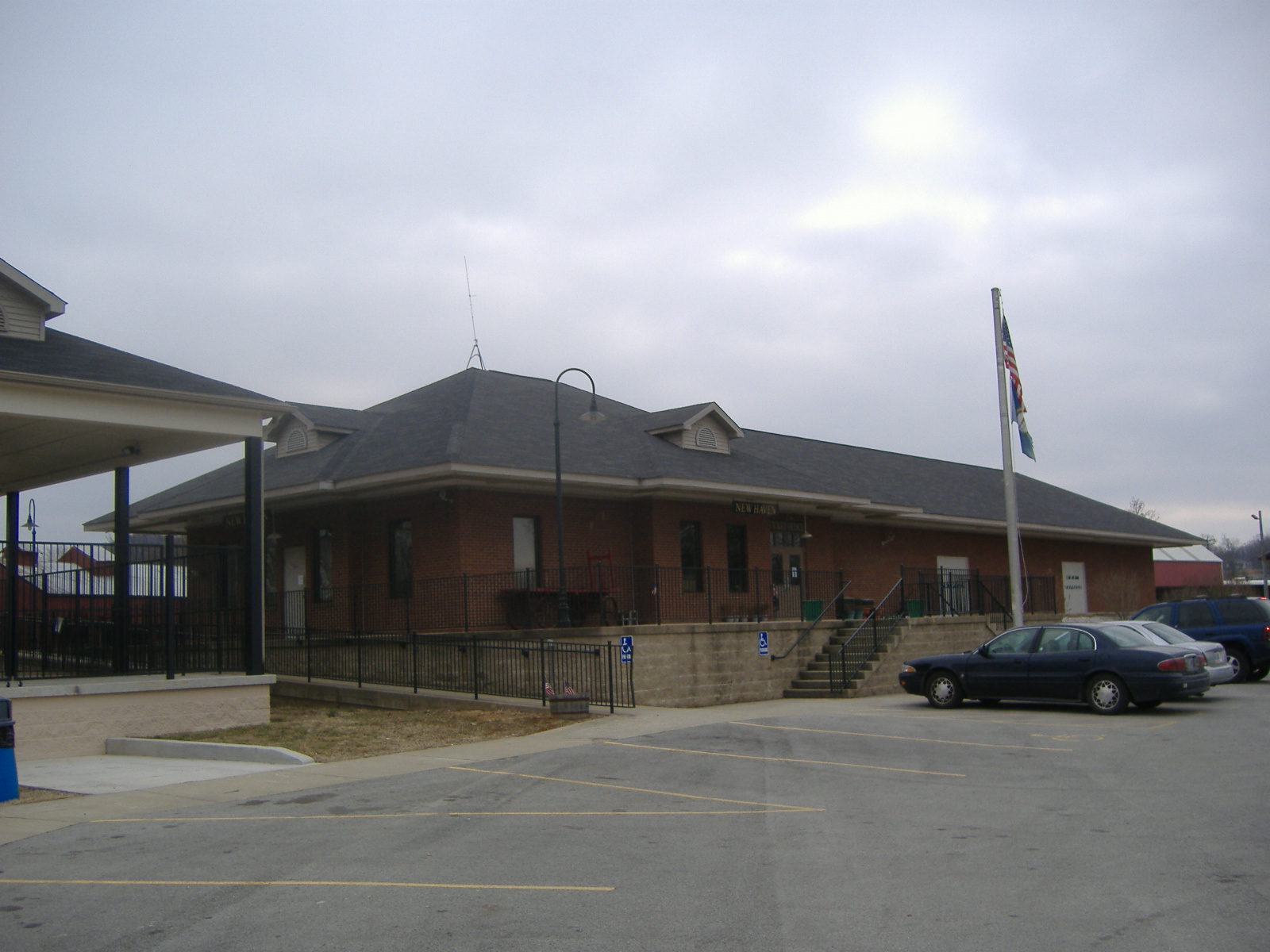
- Kentucky Railway Museum, New Haven, Kentucky

- Location of New Haven in Nelson County, Kentucky.
- Coordinates: 37°39′33″N 85°35′19″W
- Country: United States
- State: Kentucky
- County: Nelson
- Incorporated: 1839
- Named for: New Haven, Connecticut

Area
  - Total: 0.58 sq mi (1.50 km^{2})
  - Land: 0.58 sq mi (1.50 km^{2})
  - Water: 0.0039 sq mi (0.01 km^{2})
- Elevation: 502 ft (153 m)

Population (2020)
  - Total: 798
  - Density: 1,380.9/sq mi (533.15/km^{2})
- Time zone: UTC-5 (Eastern (EST))
  - Summer (DST): UTC-4 (EDT)
- ZIP code: 40051
- Area code: 502
- FIPS code: 21-55758
- GNIS feature ID: 2404360
- Website: https://newhaven.ky.gov/

New Haven is a home rule-class city in Nelson County, Kentucky, United States. As of the 2020 census, New Haven had a population of 798.

== Geography ==
New Haven is located adjacent to the Nelson-Larue county line at the intersection of US Route 31E and Kentucky Route 52. Rolling Fork flows past the west side of the community. Bardstown is approximately 12 miles to the northeast on route 31E.

According to the United States Census Bureau, the city has a total area of 0.6 square miles (1.6 km^{2}), all land.

== Demographics ==
Historical population
Census	Pop.	Note	%±
1870	99		—
1880	437		341.4%
1890	389		−11.0%
1900	350		−10.0%
1910	405		15.7%
1920	104		−74.3%
1930	68		−34.6%
1940	549		707.4%
1950	563		2.6%
1960	1,009		79.2%
1970	977		−3.2%
1980	926		−5.2%
1990	796		−14.0%
2000	849		6.7%
2010	855		0.7%
2020	798		−6.7%
U.S. Decennial Census

As of the census of 2000, there were 849 people, 341 households, and 243 families residing in the city. The population density was 1,523.0 inhabitants per square mile (588.0/km^{2}). There were 355 housing units at an average density of 636.8 per square mile (245.9/km^{2}). The racial makeup of the city was 97.53% White, 1.06% African American, 0.24% Asian, 0.47% from other races, and 0.71% from two or more races. Hispanic or Latino of any race were 1.18% of the population.

There were 341 households, out of which 34.9% had children under the age of 18 living with them, 46.0% were married couples living together, 20.5% had a female householder with no husband present, and 28.7% were non-families. 26.1% of all households were made up of individuals, and 12.6% had someone living alone who was 65 years of age or older. The average household size was 2.49 and the average family size was 2.95.

In the city the population was spread out, with 27.1% under the age of 18, 8.7% from 18 to 24, 29.1% from 25 to 44, 19.3% from 45 to 64, and 15.8% who were 65 years of age or older. The median age was 35 years. For every 100 females, there were 92.5 males. For every 100 females age 18 and over, there were 82.6 males.

The median income for a household in the city was $29,886, and the median income for a family was $37,875. Males had a median income of $28,456 versus $20,809 for females. The per capita income for the city was $15,284. About 17.2% of families and 18.7% of the population were below the poverty line, including 25.7% of those under age 18 and 8.7% of those age 65 or over.

== Education ==
New Haven has a lending library, a branch of the Nelson County Public Library.

== Arts and culture ==
- The Abbey of Our Lady of Gethsemani - Home of the monk Thomas Merton
- Kentucky Railway Museum - Houses "Old 152", the official steam locomotive of Kentucky
