= Rolling stock of the Western Pacific Railroad Museum =

The Western Pacific Railroad Museum (WPRM) holds in its collection a total of twenty-nine diesel locomotives, one electric locomotive, one steam locomotive, fifteen passenger cars, numerous freight and maintenance cars and eighteen cabooses. They offer excursions and a "Run A Locomotive" program during the summer. The WPRM has one of the larger collections of early diesel era locomotives and freight cars in North America. The museum is often considered to have one of the most complete and historic collections of equipment and materials from a single railroad family. The holdings also include extensive corporate records and images, as well as personal collections from those who worked for the Western Pacific Railroad (WP).

== Currently owned ==
This section is a list of equipment owned by the WPRM.

=== Locomotives ===
Photograph	Locomotive	Model	Build date	Builder	Status	Notes	Refs.
	Western Pacific 165	S-34	November 1919	ALCO-Schenectady	Operational as of April 2022		
	Western Pacific 501	EMD SW1	August 1939	Electro-Motive Division	Out of service for maintenance		
	Quincy Railroad 3	GE 44-ton	August 1945	GE Transportation	Out of service		
	Western Pacific 805-A	EMD FP7	January 1950	Electro-Motive Division	Out of service		
	Feather River and Western 1857	FM H-12-44	January 1953	Fairbanks-Morse	Out of service		
	Southern Pacific 2873	EMD GP9	December 1956	Electro-Motive Division	Out of service, Oil system repairs complete, water pump removed for rebuild.		
	Kennecott Copper 778	GE 125-ton	April 1958	GE Transportation	Static display.		
	Western Pacific 2001	EMD GP20	November 1959	Electro-Motive Division	Operational		
	Western Pacific 3051	GE U30B	September 1967	GE Transportation	Under cosmetic restoration.		
	Union Pacific 6946	EMD DDA40X	September 1971	Electro-Motive Division	On static display		
	Western Pacific 1503	EMD SW1500	May 1973	Electro-Motive Division	Operational		

=== Passenger cars ===
Photograph	Car number	Build date	Builder	Type	Status	Notes	References
	Western Pacific 106 "Pioneer"	1917	Pullman Company	Business-Observation Car	Operational		

== Formerly owned, surplus ==
=== Locomotives ===
Photograph	Locomotive	Model	Build date	Manufacturer	Declaration date as "Surplus"	Status	Notes	Refs.
	Southern Pacific 3191	GP9R	May 1954	Electro-Motive Division	-	Sold to the Connecticut Central (CCCL) in 1998		
	Southern Pacific 3413	GP9E	April 1956	Electro-Motive Division	-	Sold to Arizona Central Railroad (AZRC) in 1994		
	Southern Pacific 4404	SD9E	April 1955	Electro-Motive Division	February 6, 2013	Sold to Western Rail Inc. (WRIX) in 2014.		
	Southern Pacific 4450	SD9E	April 1954	Electro-Motive Division	February 6, 2013	Scrapped on August 20, 2013		
	Milwaukee Road 5057	U25B	August 1965	General Electric	February 6, 2013	Stored at the Pend Oreille Valley Railroad (POVA). Owned by Cascade Rail Foundation		
	Union Pacific 849	GP30	September 1962	Electro-Motive Division	2017-2019	Sold to Western Rail, Inc (WRIX), now operates at Central Montana Rail (CMR)		
