= List of preserved Western Pacific Railroad rolling stock =

Class I railroad (1903 to 1982)

A large quantity of rolling stock formerly owned and operated by Western Pacific Railroad have been preserved in museums, on tourist railroads, and various other locations all across North America.

== Preserved steam locomotives ==
Photograph	Number	Build date	Builder	Class	Wheel arrangement (Whyte notation)	Disposition and location	Notes	References
	26	1909	ALCO-Schenectady		2-8-0	On static display at the Travel Town Museum, Los Angeles, California		
	94	September 1909	ALCO-Brooks	TP-29	4-6-0	On static display at the Western Railway Museum in Suisun City, California		
	164	November 1919	ALCO-Schenectady	S-34	0-6-0	On static display at Hewitt Park in Oroville, California		
	165	November 1919	ALCO-Schenectady	S-34	0-6-0	Operational at the Western Pacific Railroad Museum in Portola, California		
	334	May 1929	ALCO	MK-60-71	2-8-2	Stored at the Western Railway Museum in Suisun City, California		

=== Preserved tenders ===
Photograph	Number	Build date	Builder	Class	Wheel arrangement (Whyte notation)	Disposition and location	Location	Notes	References
	484	1943	Lima Locomotive Works (LLW)	GS-64-77	4-8-4	Locomotive scrapped, tender on static display at the Western Pacific Railroad Museum in Portola, California			

== Preserved diesel locomotives ==
Photograph	Number	Build date	Builder	Model	Wheel arrangement	Class	Disposition and location	Notes	References
	501	August 1939	Electro-Motive Division (EMD)	SW1	B-B	-	Out of service for maintenance at the Western Pacific Railroad Museum in Portola, California		
	502	December 1939	Electro-Motive Division (EMD)	SW1	B-B	-	Operational at the California State Railroad Museum in Sacramento, California	Became, and preserved as, Sacramento Northern 402.	
	504	April 1942	American Locomotive Company (ACLO)	S1	B-B	-	Stored at the Western Pacific Railroad Museum in Portola, California	Currently Quincy Railroad 4	
	607	October 1939	Electro-Motive Division (EMD)	NW2	B-B	-	Operational at the Nevada Southern Railroad Museum, Boulder, Nevada	Built as Union Pacific Railroad 1000, obtained by Western Pacific Railroad in 1968, transferred to Sacramento Northern Railroad in 1973, re-acquired by Union Pacific in 1982; donated to Deer Creek Scenic Railway, later sold to Nevada Southern Railroad.	
	608	May 1940	Electro-Motive Division (EMD)	NW2	B-B	-	Owned by the Western Pacific Railroad Museum in Portola, California		
	705	October 1952	Electro-Motive Division (EMD)	GP7	B-B	-	On static display at the Western Pacific Railroad Museum in Portola, California		
	707	October 1952	Electro-Motive Division (EMD)	GP7	B-B	RS-62	Stored at the Western Pacific Railroad Museum in Portola, California		
	708	October 1952	Electro-Motive Division (EMD)	GP7	B-B	-	On static display at the Western Pacific Railroad Museum in Portola, California		
	712	April 2, 1953	Electro-Motive Division (EMD)	GP7	B-B	-	On static display at the Western Pacific Railroad Museum in Portola, California		
	713	April 1953	Electro-Motive Division (EMD)	GP7	B-B		Operational at the Niles Canyon Railway in Sunol, California		
	725	September 1955	Electro-Motive Division (EMD)	GP9	B-B	-	Stored at the Western Pacific Railroad Museum in Portola, California		
	727	September 1955	Electro-Motive Division (EMD)	GP9	B-B	RS-62	On static display at the Elko Railroad Park, Elko, Nevada		
	731	September 1955	Electro-Motive Division (EMD)	GP9	B-B	-	Stored at the Western Pacific Railroad Museum in Portola, California		
	805-A	January 1950	Electro-Motive Division (EMD)	FP7	B-B	-	Out of service at the Western Pacific Railroad Museum in Portola, California		
	913	January 27, 1950	Electro-Motive Division (EMD)	F7A	B-B	D-239	On static display at the California State Railroad Museum in Sacramento, California		
	917-D	January 1950	Electro-Motive Division (EMD)	F7A	B-B	-	Out of service at the Western Pacific Railroad Museum in Portola, California		
	918-D	January 1950	Electro-Motive Division (EMD)	F7A	B-B	D-239	Operational at the Niles Canyon Railway in Sunol, California		
	921-D	January 1950	Electro-Motive Division (EMD)	F7A	B-B	D-239	Out of service at the Western Pacific Railroad Museum in Portola, California		
	923-A	June 1951	Electro-Motive Division (EMD)	F7A	B-B	-	On static display at the Don Rhodes Mining and Transport Museum in Port Hedland, Western Australia, Australia		
	1503	May 31, 1973	Electro-Motive Division (EMD)	SW1500	B-B	-	Operational at the Western Pacific Railroad Museum in Portola, California		
	2001	December 1, 1959	Electro-Motive Division (EMD)	GP20	B-B	-	Under ownership of the Western Pacific Railroad Museum in Portola, California		
	2252	May 25, 1972	General Electric (GE)	U23B (Note: Built originally as a U23B, rebuilt by GE into a B23-S7 "Super Seven" for the Monongahela Railway (MGA))	B-B	-	Owned by the Age of Steam Roundhouse in Sugarcreek, Ohio		
	3002	November 22, 1963	Electro-Motive Division (EMD)	GP35	B-B	-	Operational (Note: Locomotive was donated to Ogden City in operational condition and the curator of the Utah State Railroad Museum stated a desire to keep it in operational condition; but permanently the locomotive is kept on static display.) at the Ogden Union Station, Ogden, Utah		
	3051	September 1967	General Electric (GE)	U30B	B-B	-	Under cosmetic restoration at the Western Pacific Railroad Museum in Portola, California		

== Preserved passenger cars ==
Photograph	Number/Name	Build date	Builder	Type	Disposition and location	Notes	References
	106 "Pioneer"	1917	Pullman Company	Business-Observation car	Operational at the Western Pacific Railroad Museum in Portola, California		
	123	1923	Pressed Steel Car Company	Steel Baggage Express	at the Western Pacific Railroad Museum - Portola, California		
	128	1924	Pressed Steel Car Company	Baggage car	Stored at the Western Railway Museum in Suisun City, California		
	302	October 1929	Pullman Company	Passenger car	Stored at the Western Railway Museum in Suisun City, California		

== Preserved boxcars ==
Photograph	Number/Name	Build date	Builder	Type	Disposition and location	Notes	References
	WPMW 0212	-	-	-	Stored at the Western Pacific Railroad Museum in Portola, California		
	WPMW 37-6	-	-	-	Stored at the Western Pacific Railroad Museum in Portola, California		
	WPMW 37-10	July 1955	Pullman Standard	PS-1 XM boxcar	Stored at the Western Pacific Railroad Museum in Portola, California		
	3032	1955	Pullman Standard	Class XML with cushion underframe	Operational at the Western Pacific Railroad Museum in Portola, California		
	3417	January 1947	-	40-foot single door boxcar	Stored at the Western Pacific Railroad Museum in Portola, California		
	3472	-	-	-	On static display at the Western Pacific Railroad Museum in Portola, California		
	3796	December 1955	Pullman Standard	50-foot double door boxcar	On static display at the Western Pacific Railroad Museum in Portola, California		
	18503	March 1945	-	40-foot double door boxcar	On static display at the Western Pacific Railroad Museum in Portola, California		
	19801	1945	Pullman Standard	40-foot boxcar	On static display at the Western Pacific Railroad Museum in Portola, California		
	19901	September 1965	-	Transco 50-foot double door boxcar	On static display at the Western Pacific Railroad Museum in Portola, California		
	20094	May 1937	Mount Vernon Car Company	40-foot PS-1 single door boxcar	On static display at the Western Pacific Railroad Museum in Portola, California		
	20599	-	-	-	On static display at the Western Pacific Railroad Museum in Portola, California		
	20772	August 1947	-	40-foot single door boxcar	On static display at the Western Pacific Railroad Museum in Portola, California		
	20806	November 1951	Pullman Standard	40-foot PS-1 single door boxcar	On static display at the Western Pacific Railroad Museum in Portola, California		
	20807	November 1951	Pullman Standard	40-foot PS-1 single door boxcar	On static display at the Western Pacific Railroad Museum in Portola, California		
	20868	October 1951	Pullman Standard	40-foot PS-1 single door boxcar	On static display at the Western Pacific Railroad Museum in Portola, California		
	21255	November 1951	Pullman Standard	40-foot PS-1 single door boxcar	On static display at the Western Pacific Railroad Museum in Portola, California		
	22023	November 1951	Pullman Standard	40-foot PS-1 single door boxcar	Stored at the Western Pacific Railroad Museum in Portola, California		
	27198	1917	Mount Vernon Car Company	40-foot single door wooden-built boxcar (USRA design)	On static display at the Western Pacific Railroad Museum in Portola, California		
	34005	October 1960	-	50-foot double door boxcar	On static display at the Western Pacific Railroad Museum in Portola, California		
	36011	June 1955	Pullman Standard	PS-1 XM boxcar	Operational at the Western Pacific Railroad Museum in Portola, California		
	37007	August 1971	Pullman Standard	50-foot single plug door boxcar	On static display at the Western Pacific Railroad Museum in Portola, California		
	61180	December 1957	Pacific Car and Foundry	-	Stored, on static display at the Western Pacific Railroad Museum in Portola, California		
	64004	-	-	-	Stored at the Western Pacific Railroad Museum in Portola, California		
	64806	-	-	-	On static display at the Western Pacific Railroad Museum in Portola, California		
	903568	-	-	-	Stored, on static display at the Western Pacific Railroad Museum in Portola, California		

== Preserved cabooses ==
Photograph	Number	Build date	Class	Disposition and location	Notes	References
	437	-	-	On static display at the Elko Railroad Park, Elko, Nevada		

== Bibliography ==
- Staff, Virgil (1982). D-day on the Western Pacific: A Railroad's Decision to Dieselize. Interurban Press. ISBN 978-0-916374-51-8.
