= 1966 in rail transport =

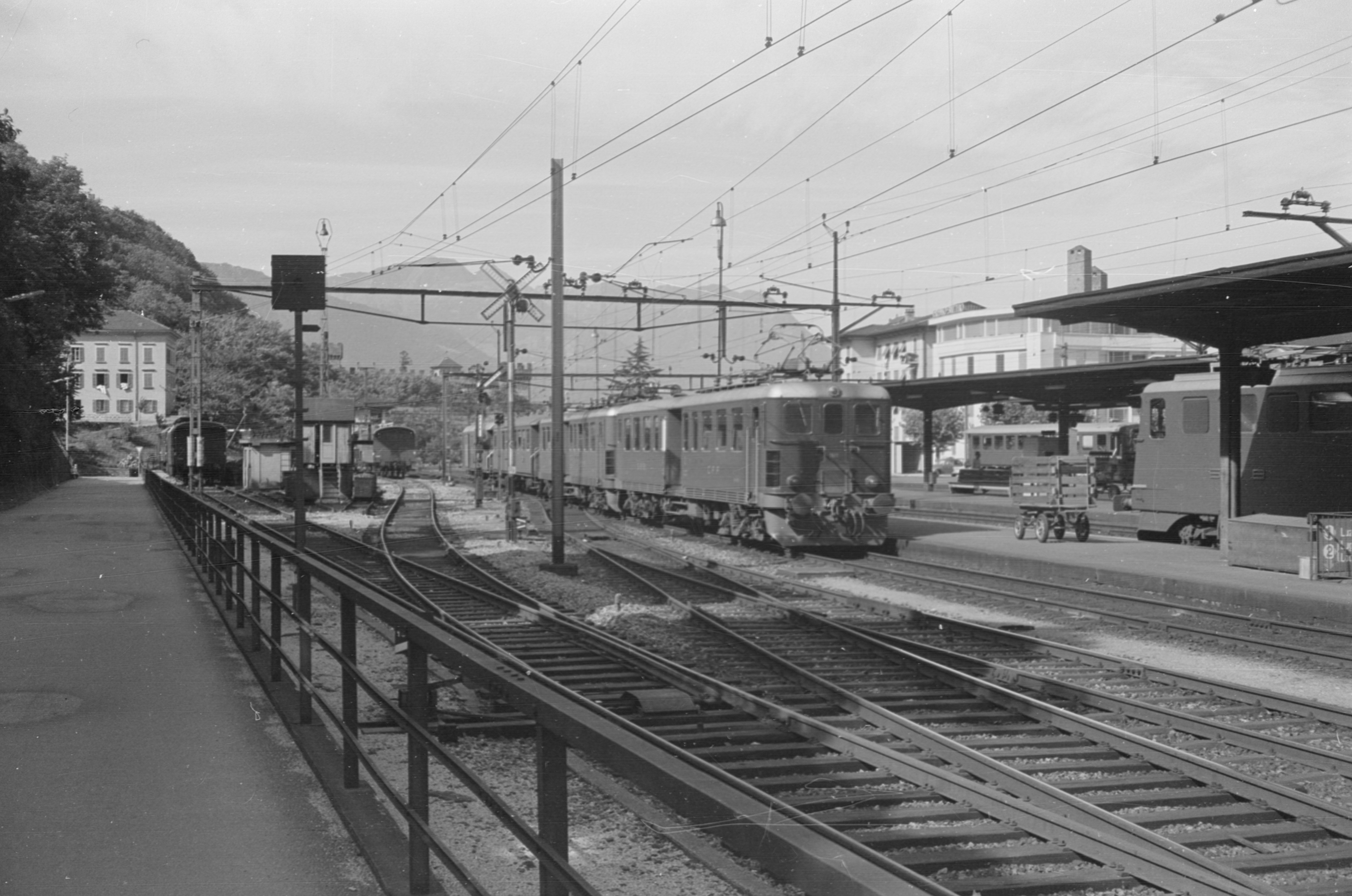

This article lists events related to rail transport that occurred in 1966.

== Events ==
=== January events ===
- January – GM introduces the EMD SD40.
- January – GE introduces the GE U28B.
- January 3 – British Rail begins full electric passenger services over the West Coast Main Line from Euston to Manchester and Liverpool with 100 mph (160 km/h) operation from London to Rugby. Services officially inaugurated April 18.

=== March events ===
- March 7 – The Western Region of British Railways closes the former Somerset & Dorset Joint Railway.
- March 25 – Hachinohe Rinkai Railway Line was opened.

=== April events ===
- April 20 – The second segment, between Predeal and Câmpina, of Căile Ferate Române's (in Romania) electrification is completed.

=== May events ===
- May 28 - Historic Red Clay Valley Incorporated begins operating steam tourist trains on the 10.2-mile Landenberg Branch of the Baltimore and Ohio Railroad. The tracks were constructed in 1871–2 by the Wilmington & Western Railroad. The operation is the 7th oldest standard gauge tourist heritage railroad operating in the US.

=== July events ===
- 15 July – The London Midland Region of British Railways allows West Indian-born Asquith Xavier to transfer as a guard from London Marylebone to Euston, overturning the opposition of National Union of Railwaymen members of the local staff committee.
- July 17 – The first passenger operations begin at the Illinois Railway Museum using car number 415.

=== September events ===
- September 3 – The London Midland Region of British Railways closes the former Great Central Railway London Extension to passenger traffic between Aylesbury and Rugby Central, bringing an end to its career as "the last main line".

=== October events ===
- October 14 – Montreal Metro inaugurated.

=== December events ===
- December – GE introduces the GE U30B.

=== Unknown date events ===
- ALCO introduces the ALCO Century 415.
- The Chicago, Burlington & Quincy Railroad removes from service and donates the General Pershing Zephyr power car to the National Museum of Transport in St Louis, Missouri.
- Beyer, Peacock & Company of Manchester, England, turns out its last locomotives, British Rail Class 25/3 diesels.
- Norris Roy Crump returns to the presidency of Canadian Pacific for a short period, succeeding Robert Emerson. Crump, in turn, is succeeded by Ian David Sinclair.

== Deaths ==
=== Unknown date deaths ===
- Martin W. Clement, president of the Pennsylvania Railroad 1935–1948 (b. 1881).
