= SW1 =

SW1 may refer to:

- SW1, a postcode district in the London SW postcode area
- EMD SW1, a diesel-electric locomotive manufactured between 1938 and 1953
- Star Wars: Episode I – The Phantom Menace, a 1999 film
- Star Wars MUSH, an online text-based role-playing game
- Shawn Wayans, known as DJ SW1
- Cheng Lim LRT station, Singapore
