= Western Pacific Railroad Museum =

Railway museum in Portola, California, US

Coordinates: 39°48′13.86″N 120°28′34.46″W

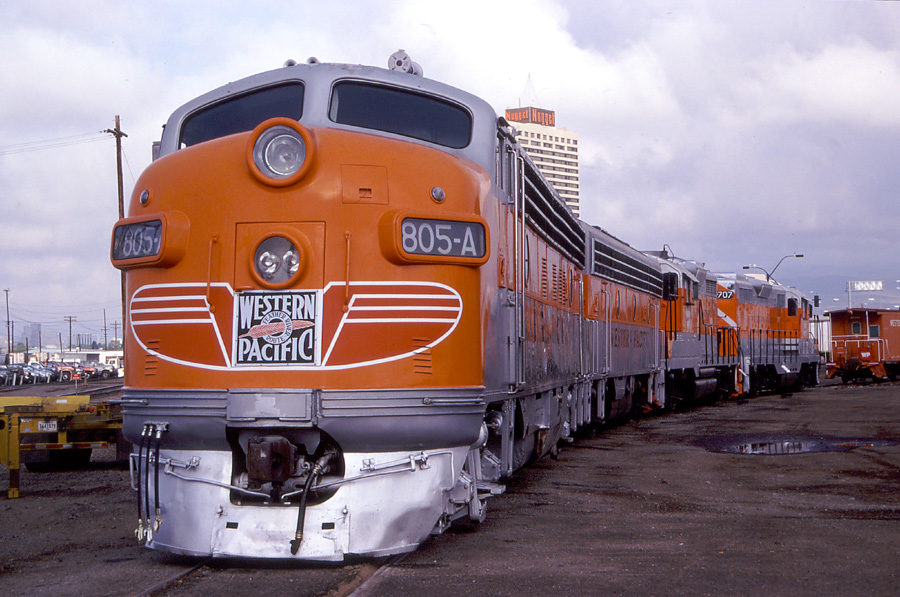
- WP FP7 805-A from the Western Pacific Railroad Museum, on display in Sparks, Nevada in 2004. This locomotive once pulled the California Zephyr passenger train.

Overview
- Headquarters: Portola, California
- Reporting mark: FRRX
- Locale: Northern California
- Dates of operation: 1984–Present

Technical
- Track gauge: 4 ft 8 1/2 in (1,435 mm) standard gauge

Other
- Website: www.wplives.org

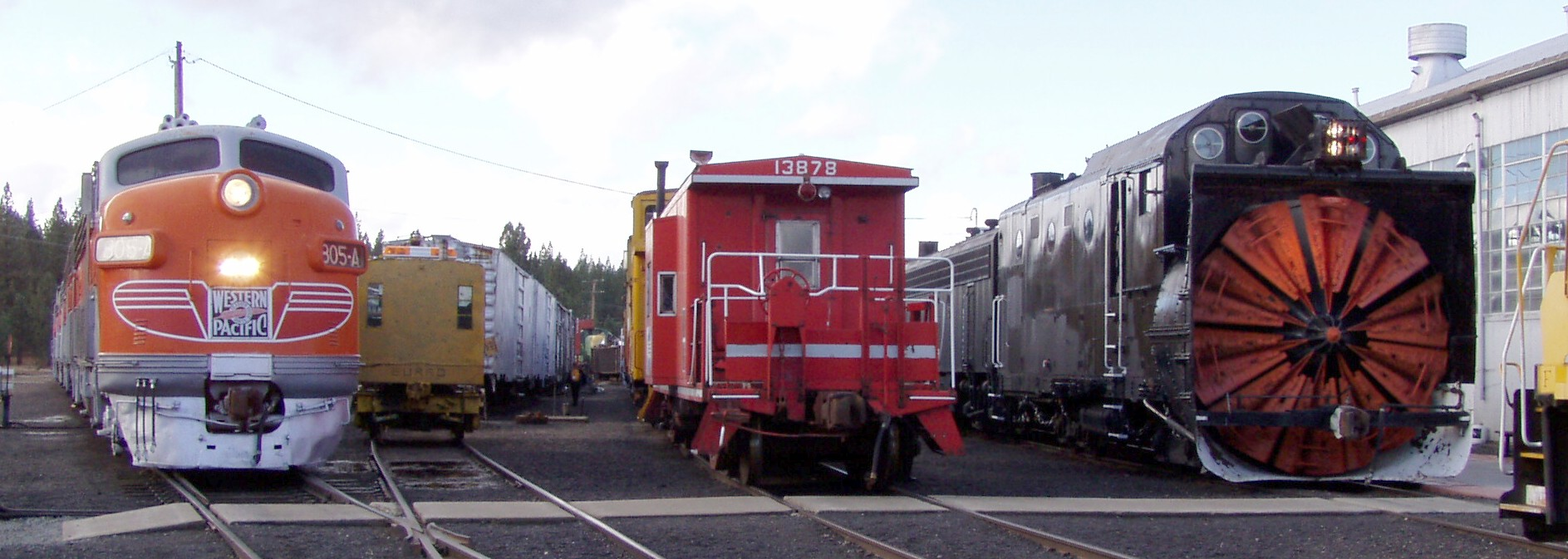
A typical equipment lineup at the museum

The Western Pacific Railroad Museum (WPRM) in Portola, California, known as the Portola Railroad Museum until January 1, 2006, is a heritage railroad that preserves and operates historic American railroad equipment and preserves documents, photos and information. The museum's mission is to preserve the history of the Western Pacific Railroad and is operated by the Feather River Rail Society (reporting mark FRRX), founded in 1983. It is located at a former Western Pacific locomotive facility, adjacent to the Union Pacific's former Western Pacific mainline through the Feather River Canyon.

== Museum collection ==
The museum holds in its collection twenty-nine diesel locomotives, one electric locomotive, one steam locomotive (Operational as of April 2022), fifteen passenger cars (including four from the well-known California Zephyr), numerous freight and maintenance cars and eighteen cabooses. They offer excursions and a "Run A Locomotive" program during the summer. The WPRM has one of the larger collections of early diesel era locomotives and freight cars in North America. The museum is often considered to have one of the most complete and historic collections of equipment and materials from a single railroad family. The holdings also include extensive corporate records and images, as well as personal collections from those who worked for the Western Pacific.

Logos of the Western Pacific Railroad and the Feather River Rail Society, operators of the Western Pacific Railroad Museum.

The WPRM is a "hands-on" museum that allows visitors to board and explore locomotives and train cars in their collection.

Among the significant pieces in the WPRM collection are Western Pacific 805-A, an FP7 model passenger locomotive that pulled the California Zephyr; Southern Pacific EMD GP9 #2873, nicknamed "the Kodachrome" by the volunteers, due to it being painted with the Kodachrome scheme from the failed Santa Fe–Southern Pacific merger; WP 2001, the first GP20 locomotive (an early turbocharged diesel); WP 501, an early switch engine and the first diesel purchased by the Western Pacific; Western Pacific 0-6-0 steam locomotive 165, an oil burning switch engine built by ALCO in 1919; WP 3051, one of only two remaining GE U30B locomotives; WP 106 business car "Charles O. Sweetwood", built in 1917 and used during the Korean War as a rolling blood bank; WP 37, a 200-ton rail-mounted crane, two track clearing snowplows (one wedge type and one rotary); and several rare, early 20th century freight cars. Also located at the site are the Portola Diesel Shop, built in 1953, and an interlocking tower from Oakland, California, currently stored unrebuilt. The Western Pacific Hospital, built in 1911 and one of the few remaining railroad hospitals in the country, was part of the museum until it was destroyed in an arson fire on September 7, 2011. The WPRM maintains several of their road diesels in mainline operating condition and has made occasional movements on Class I railroads using their own historic motive power.

=== Currently owned ===
Photograph	Locomotive	Model	Build date	Builder	Status	Notes	Refs.
	Western Pacific 165	S-34	November 1919	ALCO-Schenectady	Operational as of April 2022		
	Western Pacific 501	EMD SW1	8/1939	Electro-Motive Division	Out of service for maintenance		
	Western Pacific 805-A	EMD FP7	January 1950	Electro-Motive Division	Out of service		
	Feather River and Western 1857	FM H-12-44	January 1953	Fairbanks-Morse	Out of service		
	Southern Pacific 2873	EMD GP9	December 1956	Electro-Motive Division	Out of service, Oil system repairs complete, water pump removed for rebuild.		

=== Formerly owned, surplus ===
Photograph	Locomotive	Model	Build date	Manufacturer	Declaration date as "Surplus"	Status	Notes	Refs.
	Southern Pacific 4404	SD9E	April 1955	Electro-Motive Division	February 6, 2013	Sold to Western Rail Inc. in 2014.		
	Southern Pacific 4450	SD9E	April 1954	Electro-Motive Division	February 6, 2013	Scrapped on August 20, 2013		
	Milwaukee Road 5057	U25B	August 1965	General Electric	February 6, 2013	Stored at the Pend Oreille Valley Railroad. Owned by Cascade Rail Foundation		
	Union Pacific 849	GP30	September 1962	Electro-Motive Division	2017-2019	Sold to Western Rail, Inc (WRIX), now operates at Central Montana Rail (CMR)		

== Operating a locomotive ==
One aspect of the Western Pacific Railroad Museum is its nationally known Run A Locomotive (RAL) program. Except for winter and certain weekends when special events are in progress, the museum provides visitors a chance to be an engineer for an hour. Participants are given on-the-ground instruction, then they get to operate a real locomotive of their choice for an hour. A qualified engineer joins them in the locomotive for oversight and further instruction.

== Zephyr Project ==
The Zephyr Project is a program of the Feather River Rail Society to acquire, preserve and restore cars, locomotives, personal stories and artifacts relating to the California Zephyr. Currently, the Project's collection of equipment includes Western Pacific FP7 no. 805-A, Silver Hostle, a dome lounge car, dome-coach "Silver Lodge" and dining car "Silver Plate". In addition, the dome-coach "Silver Rifle" is on long-term loan from the Golden Gate Railroad Museum.

== See also ==
- Rolling stock of the Western Pacific Railroad Museum
- Feather River Route
  - Clio trestle
  - Keddie Wye
- List of California railroads
- List of heritage railroads in California
- List of museums in California
- List of railway museums
- List of common carrier freight railroads in the United States
