= Reading Railroad Heritage Museum =

- Established: 2008
- Location: Hamburg, Pennsylvania
- Coordinates: 40°32′49″N 75°58′52″W
- Type: Rail museum
- Collections: Vintage Reading Railroad rolling stock
- Owners: Reading Company Technical & Historical Society
- Website: www.readingrailroad.org

The Reading Railroad Heritage Museum is a railroad museum located at 500 S 3rd Street in Hamburg, Pennsylvania dedicated to the preservation of the Reading Railroad, owned and operated by the Reading Company Technical & Historical Society. It features several pieces of retired rolling stock, including Blueliners and Budd Rail Diesel Cars, plus a few model train layouts as well other railroad memorabilia. The museum is open year-round on Saturdays and Sundays.

== Collection ==
All equipment built for the Reading and listed by original road number, unless specified.

=== Diesel Locomotives/Multiple Units ===
- ALCO C424 #5204
- ALCO C630 #5308
- ALCO RS-3 #485
- Baldwin DS-4-4-1000 #702
- Budd RDC-1 #9152- Last RDC Built by Budd
- Budd RDC-1 #9162
- EMD FP7 #900
- EMD FP7 #902 (on loan to SMS Rail Lines)
- EMD GP7 #621
- EMD GP30 #5513; First production model built
- EMD GP35 #3640; Last locomotive overhauled and painted by the Reading
- EMD GP39-2 #3412; Operational; Under restoration
- EMD NW2 #103; Operational
- EMD SW1200 #2719
- GE U30C #6300
- Norfolk Southern Road Slug #9905; rebuilt from FM H-24-66 Wabash #552.

=== Electric Multiple Units ===
- Class EPB #863; Only surviving EPB EMU with its original seats
- Class RER "Blueliner" #9104

(ex-#305)

- Class RER "Blueliner" #9110; Last Car on the final train to depart Reading Terminal

(ex-#839)

- Class RER "Blueliner" #9111

(ex-#827)

- Class RER "Blueliner" #9113

( ex-#833 )

- Class RER "Blueliner" #9131

( ex-#881)

- SEPTA Silverliner II #9001 (has yet to be delivered)

== See also ==
- Reading Company
