= GE U28B =

General Electric U28B
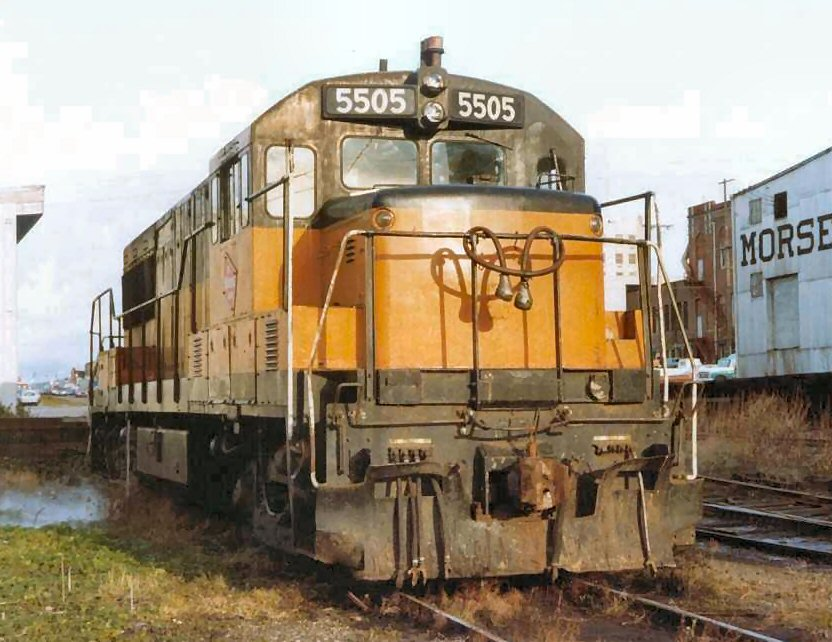
- Milwaukee Road U28B #5505
Type and origin
- Power type: Diesel-electric
- Builder: GE Transportation Systems
- Model: U28B
- Build date: January 1966–January 1967
- Total produced: 148
Specifications
- Configuration
  - AAR: B-B
  - UIC: Bo'Bo'
- Gauge: 4 ft 8 1/2 in (1,435 mm)
- Prime mover: GE FDL-16
- RPM range: 650–1050 rpm
- Traction motors: GE-752
Performance figures
- Maximum speed: 70 mph (110 km/h)
- Power output: 2,800 hp (2,100 kW)
- Tractive effort: 70,000 lbf (310 kN) (starting) 64,000 lbf (280 kN) (continuous)
Career
- Operators: See table below
- Locale: United States
- Disposition: Two preserved, remainder presumed scrapped

The GE U28B diesel-electric locomotive model replaced the U25B in early 1966, featuring a slightly uprated prime mover (only 300 hp (220 kW) more power than the U25B). Early units had the same car body styling as the U25B, while later units had design features (e.g., shortened nose) more in common with later models. After only a year of production, this model was superseded by the U30B.
