= EMD SW600 =

American diesel switcher locomotive

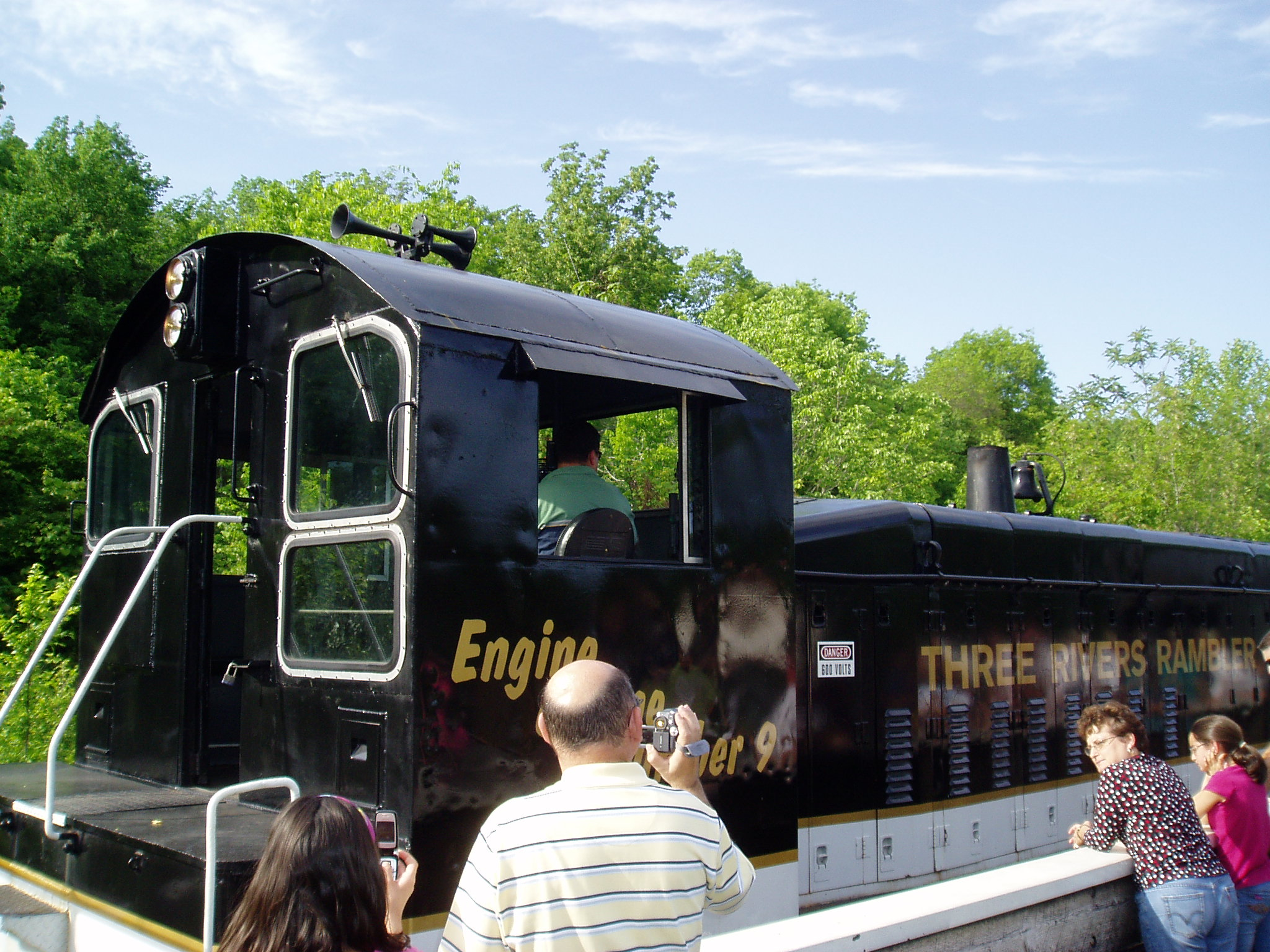
Type and origin
- Power type: Diesel-electric
- Builder: General Motors Electro-Motive Division
- Model: SW600
- Build date: February 1954 – January 1962
- Total produced: 15
Specifications
- Gauge: 4 ft 8 1/2 in (1,435 mm)
- Prime mover: EMD 6-567C
- Engine type: V6 Two-stroke diesel
- Aspiration: Roots-type supercharger
- Cylinders: 6
Performance figures
- Power output: 600 hp (450 kW))
- Tractive effort: 49,500 lb (22,500 kg)
Career
- Locale: United States

The EMD SW600 is a diesel switcher locomotive built by General Motors Electro-Motive Division between February 1954 and January 1962. It shared the same carbody design as EMD's more powerful SW900 and SW1200 models but only generated 600 horsepower, and replaced the SW1 in EMD's catalogue. Power was provided by an EMD 567C 6-cylinder engine, which generated 600 horsepower (450 kW).

== Original owners ==
15 examples of this model were built for American railroads and industrials.

Road	Quantity	Road number	Notes
McLouth Steel	2	8–9	
Northern Indiana Public Service Company	1	4	
Chicago and North Western Railway	2	1280–1281	
Detroit Edison Company	1	213	
Texas Company (“Texaco”)	1	23	
Columbus and Southern Ohio Electric Company	1	512	
Shell Oil Company	1	9	
Gulf Oil Company	1	9	
Philadelphia Electric Company	1	30	
Clinchfield Coal Company	1	100	
Marathon Southern Corporation	1	1	
Arizona Public Service Company	1	1	
Public Service Company of Colorado	1	15-1	
Total	15		

== See also ==
- List of GM-EMD locomotives
