= Western Rail Switching =

Overview
- Headquarters: Airway Heights, Washington
- Reporting mark: WRS
- Locale: Spokane County, Washington
- Dates of operation: 2004–2009

Technical
- Track gauge: 4 ft 8 1/2 in (1,435 mm) standard gauge

Western Rail Switching (reporting mark WRS) was a switching and terminal railroad, operating a line west of Spokane, Washington.

== Ownership ==
It was owned by Western Rail, Inc., a leasing company.

In 2004, Spokane County bought the Burlington Northern and Santa Fe Railway's Geiger Spur, an approximately 5.9 mi (9.5 km) line, and designated WRS to operate it, beginning in October.

Following the takeover of the nearby Palouse River and Coulee City Railroad by the Eastern Washington Gateway Railroad (EWG), the Washington Department of Transportation financed a newly constructed connection of approximately 3.45 mi (5.55 km) of new track to the new short line operator.

== Opening ==
This realignment was opened on January 2, 2009, bypassing Fairchild Air Force Base, through which the spur had run. According to an STB filing, the United States Air Force had required Spokane County to remove rail operations from Fairchild Air Force Base for security reasons, with a deadline of September 30, 2009.

The west end of the spur connects with the Washington Eastern Railroad at Geiger Junction, near Medical Lake.

== Operator ==
Not long after beginning operations, EWG filed with the Surface Transportation Board to replace WRS as operator, and became the exclusive operator of the Geiger Spur, with the change of operator eligible for consummation on or after December 21, 2008. EWG in turn operated the spur until October 2018, when Washington Eastern Railroad, LLC entered a 10-year lease agreement with Spokane County and replaced EWG as the line's exclusive lessee and operator, with the exemption effective no earlier than October 25, 2018.

== Cargo Traffic ==
Traffic carried on the Geiger Spur consists primarily of inbound steel loads.
