= Western Rail, Inc. =

Western Rail Inc.
- Western Rails Inc.

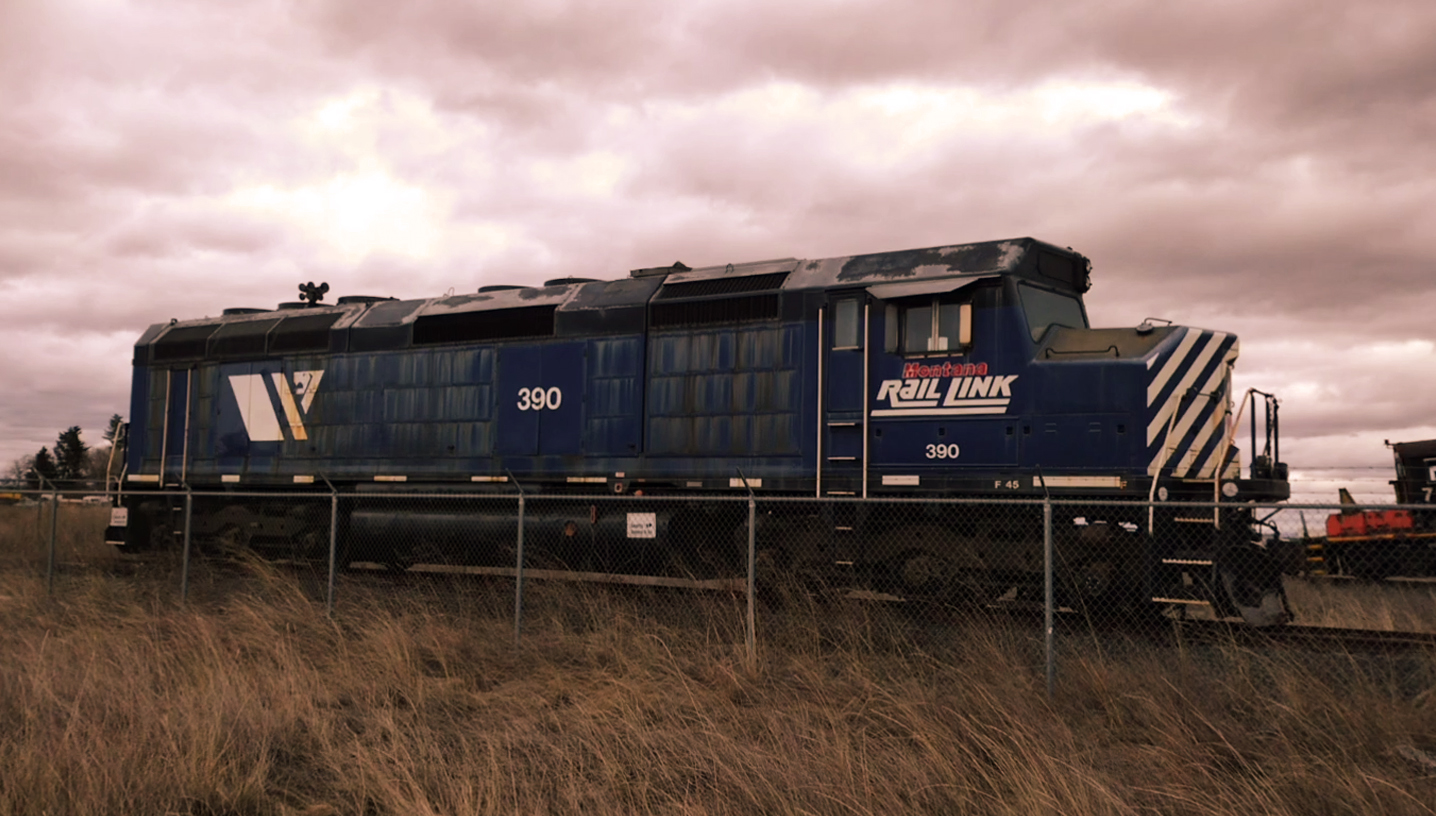
- Montana Rail Link 390 at Western Rail Inc. (WRIX) on February 20, 2023.

Overview
- Headquarters: Airway Heights, Washington
- Founders: Todd Havens
- Reporting mark: WRIX
- Dates of operation: 1994–present

Technical
- Track gauge: 4 ft 8 1/2 in (1,435 mm) standard gauge

Other
- Website: westernrailinc.com

Western Rail, Inc. sometimes nicknamed Western Rails Inc. (reporting mark WRIX) is an American shortline railroad organization based in Airway Heights, Washington. The company was founded by Todd Havens with the purpose of leasing, purchasing, selling and working on locomotives.

== Locomotive fleet ==
Photograph	Unit	Model	Builder	Disposition	Notes	References
	3	GP20	EMD	Under ownership		
	13	SD9m	EMD	Sold to AFX		
	23	SW9	EMD	Sold to Washington Western		
	102	SW9	EMD	Under ownership		
	401	SW9	EMD	Under ownership		
	439	SD9E	EMD	Sold to Noah McCann (SPTX)		
	1229	SD18M	EMD	Sold to AgRail		
	1343	GP7u	EMD	Sold to Columbia Terminal Railway (COLT)		
	1407	GMD1	EMD	Under ownership		
	1500	SW1500	EMD	Under ownership		
	1627	GP9	EMD	Scrapped		
	1634	GP9	EMD	Scrapped		
	1838	GP9	EMD	Leased to the Washington, Idaho and Montana Railway (WI&M)		
	3006	GP30	EMD	Scrapped		
	4404	SD9E	EMD	Operational at the Pend Oreille Valley Railroad (POVA) in Usk, Washington (coordinates: 48°18'22.7"N 117°16'24.6"W)	Sold from WPRM	
	9129	C40-8	GE	Sold to EWG		
	35021	SD40T-2	EMD	Under ownership		
	35022	SD40T-2	EMD	Under ownership		

== Accidents and incidents ==
- On March 20, 2018, WRIX SW1500 no. 1500 had its horn stolen at the Rogue Valley Terminal Railroad.
