= Reading 902 and 903 =

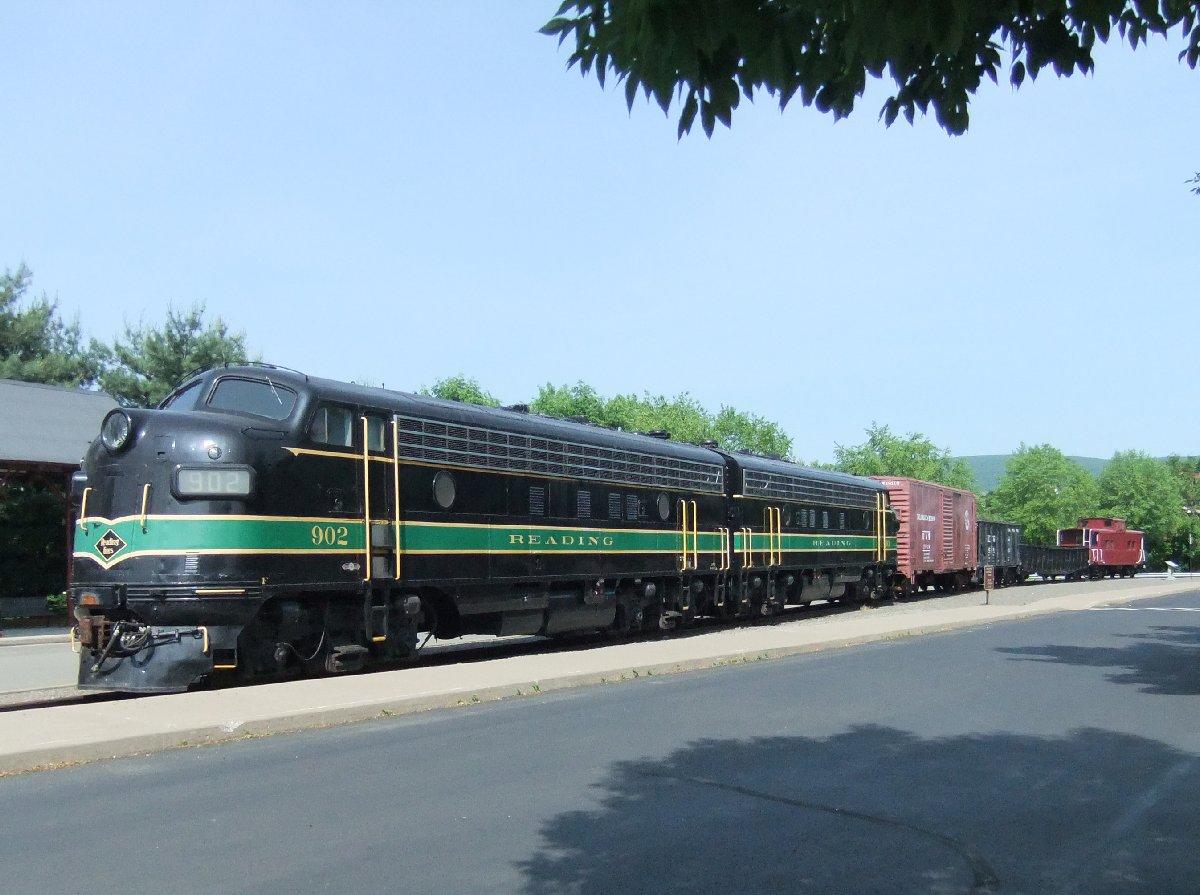
Type and origin
- Power type: Diesel
- Builder: General Motors Electro-Motive Division (EMD)
- Serial number: 11389
- Model: FP7
- Build date: June 1, 1950
Specifications
- Configuration
  - AAR: B-B
- Gauge: 4 ft 8 1/2 in (1,435 mm)
Career
- Operators: Reading Company; SEPTA; SMS Rail Lines
- Numbers: RDG 902; SEPTA 4372; RDG 903; SEPTA 4373
- Retired: 1981
- Restored: 1995
- Current owner: Reading Company Technical and Historical Society (902); SMS Rail Lines (903)
- Disposition: Operational

Reading Company 902 and Reading Company 903 are two preserved ex-Reading Company EMD FP7s.

== History ==
Reading 902 and 903 were among of the first six FP7s ordered by the railroad in March 1950 to replace passenger steam locomotives. The two units were completed on June 1 of that year and delivered to the Reading via the Baltimore and Ohio Railroad. The pair pulled their first train on June 6. In the following years, the two locomotives sometimes worked together, and sometimes were split, depending on the size of their trains.

SEPTA inherited the units in 1974, and they were renumbered by the new Consolidated Rail Corporation in 1976, with the 902 becoming 4372 and the 903 becoming 4373. During the SEPTA years, the FP7s usually operated in push-pull configuration. 903 was the first FP7 to receive the SEPTA paint scheme in February 1978. 902 was involved in a derailment in February 1978, and when it re-entered service in June, it was also repainted into the SEPTA paint. SEPTA ceased all diesel-operations in 1981, and the locomotives were retired.

Both locomotives were eventually purchased by the National Railway Historical Society in September 1983. 902 was obtained by the Lancaster Chapter of the NRHS, while 903 purchased by the Philadelphia Chapter of the NRHS. They were stored at the Railroad Museum of Pennsylvania. Restoration on the two began in 1986 and was completed in 1995. In January 2007, the Lancaster Chapter donated the 902 to the Reading Company Technical and Historical Society.

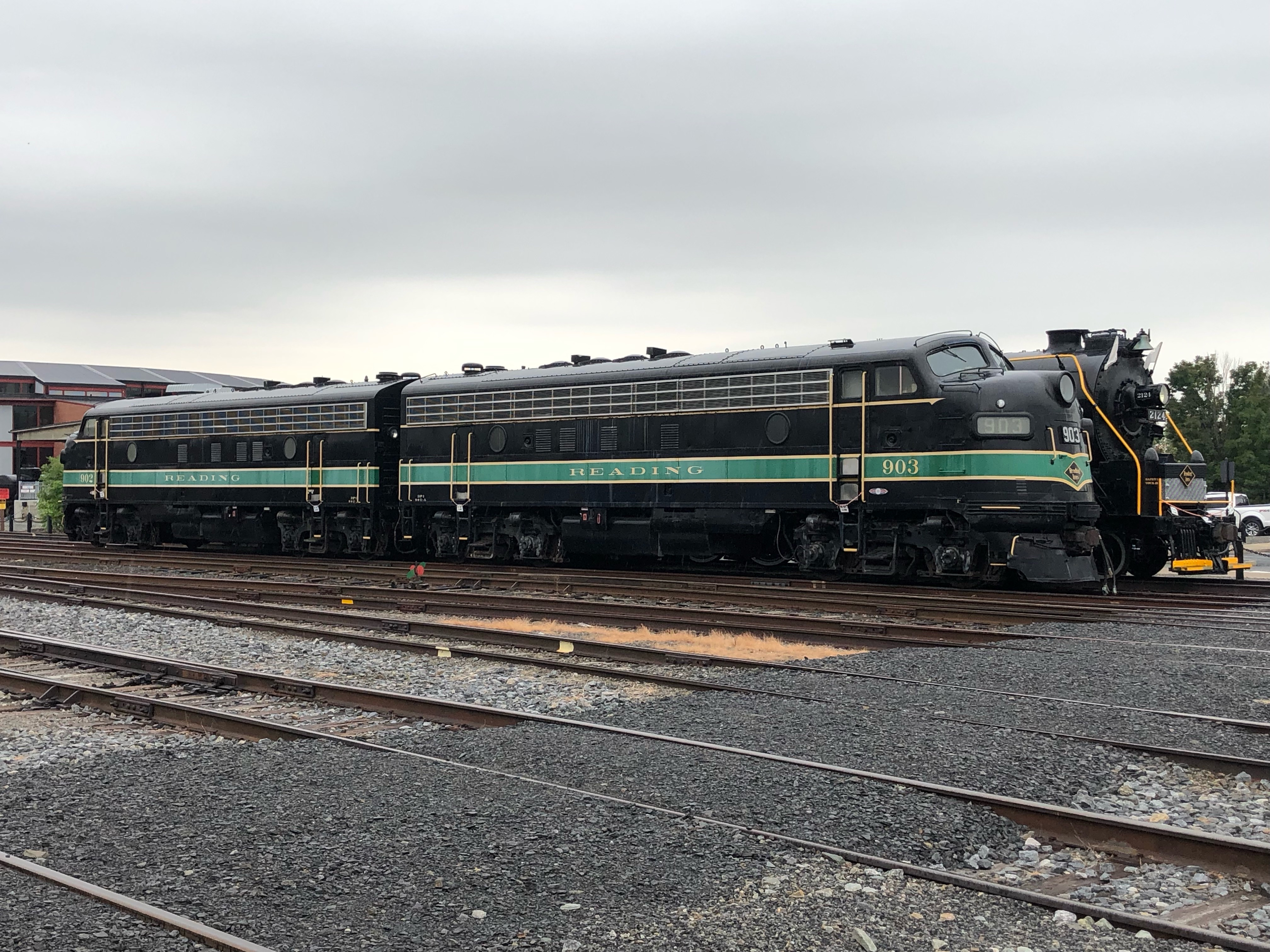
Reading FP7s #903 and #902 parked next to Reading 4-8-4 #2124 (October 2021).

902 and 903 operated an excursion on an ex-Reading line owned by Penn Eastern Rail Lines in October of that year, but no more trips were planned for 2008.

In January 2010, the 902 and 903 were loaned to Steamtown National Historic Site for a year to maintain the locomotives in exchange for excursion rights. Both locomotives were displayed outside near the parking lot.

In September 2023, the 903 was sold to SMS Rail Lines for use on their Woodstown Central tourist railroad in New Jersey. The 902 was also leased to SMS for the same purpose. Both locomotives were moved to their new home in early 2024. As of September 2025, both 902 and 903 are now operational and running, along with 0-6-0 former US Army steam locomotive No. 9.
