= EMD FP7 =

Model of 1500 hp North American diesel cab locomotive

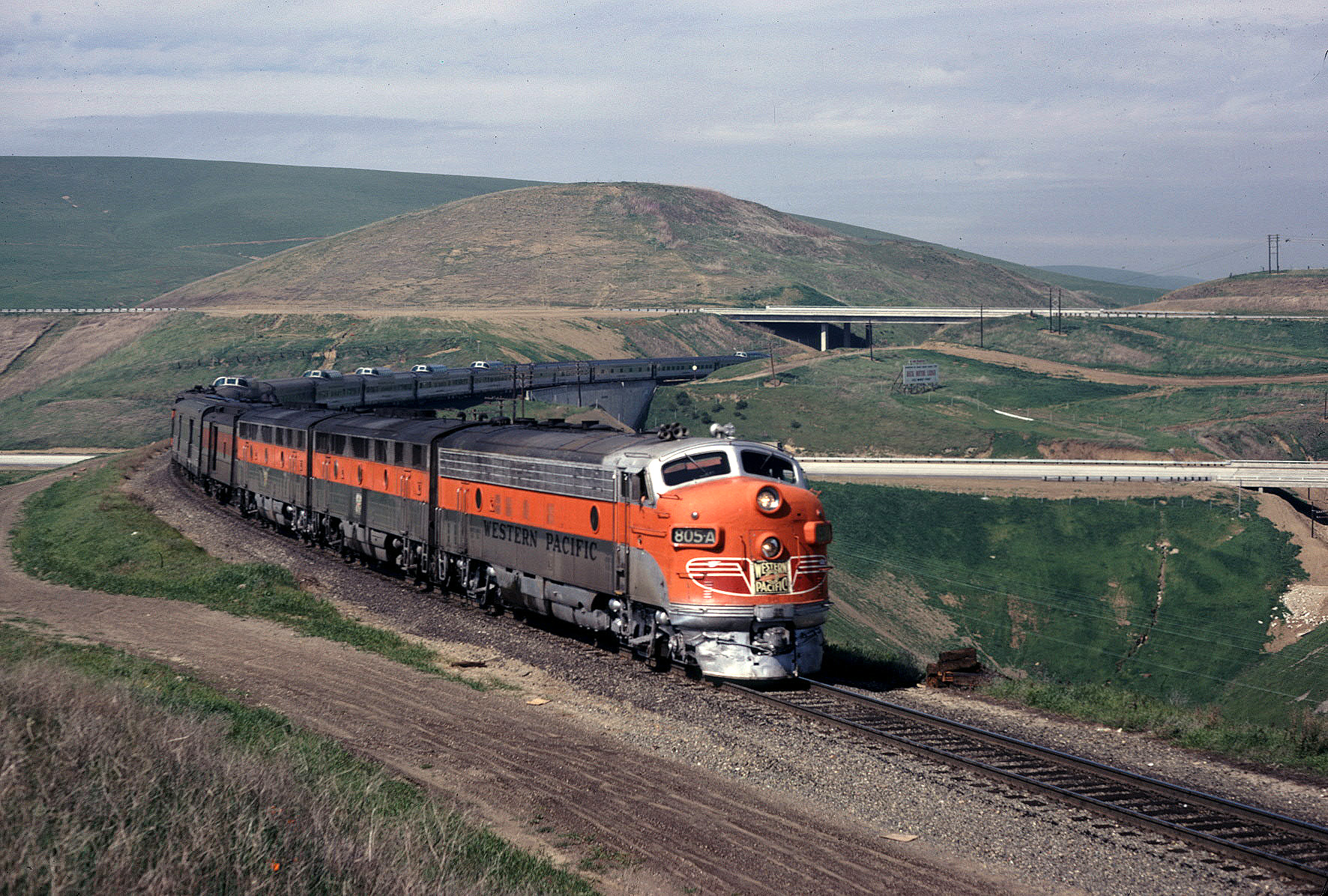
- Western Pacific 805-A, an EMD FP7, pulls the California Zephyr in March 1970
Type and origin
- Power type: Diesel-electric
- Builder: General Motors Electro-Motive Division (EMD); General Motors Diesel (GMD, Canada)
- Model: FP7
- Build date: June 1949 – December 1953
- Total produced: 381
Specifications
- Configuration
  - AAR: B-B
  - UIC: Bo'Bo'
- Gauge: 4 ft 8 1/2 in (1,435 mm)
- Trucks: Blomberg B
- Wheel diameter: 40 in (1,016 mm)
- Minimum curve: 23° (251 ft or 76.5 m radius)
- Wheelbase: 43 ft (13.11 m)
- Length: 55 ft 2 1/4 in (16.82 m)
- Width: 10 ft 8 in (3.25 m)
- Height: 15 ft (4.57 m)
- Loco weight: 260,000 lb (120,000 kg)
- Fuel capacity: 1,200 US gal (4,500 L; 1,000 imp gal)
- Prime mover: EMD 16-567B
- RPM range: 800
- Engine type: Two-stroke V16 diesel
- Aspiration: Roots-type supercharger
- Generator: EMD D-12
- Traction motors: (4) EMD D-27-B
- Cylinders: 16
- Cylinder size: 8 1/2 in × 10 in (216 mm × 254 mm)
Performance figures
- Maximum speed: 100–119 mph (161–192 km/h)
- Power output: 1,500 horsepower (1,100 kW)
Career
- Locale: North America, Saudi Arabia

The EMD FP7 is a 1,500 horsepower (1,100 kW), B-B dual-service passenger and freight-hauling diesel locomotive produced between June 1949 and December 1953 by General Motors' Electro-Motive Division and General Motors Diesel. Final assembly was at GM-EMD's La Grange, Illinois plant, excepting locomotives destined for Canada, in which case final assembly was at GMD's plant in London, Ontario. The FP7 was essentially EMD's F7A locomotive extended by four feet to give greater water capacity for the steam generator for heating passenger trains.

== Design ==
While EMD's E-units were successful passenger engines, their A1A-A1A wheel arrangement made them less useful in mountainous terrain. Several railroads had tried EMD's F3 in passenger service, but there was insufficient water capacity in an A-unit fitted with dynamic brakes. The Atchison, Topeka and Santa Fe Railway's solution was to replace the steam generators in A-units with a water tank, and so only fitted steam generators into the B-units. The Northern Pacific Railway's solution was to fit extra water tanks into the first baggage car, and to pipe the water to the engines. EMD's solution to the problem was to add the stretched FP7 to its catalog increasing the water storage capacity.

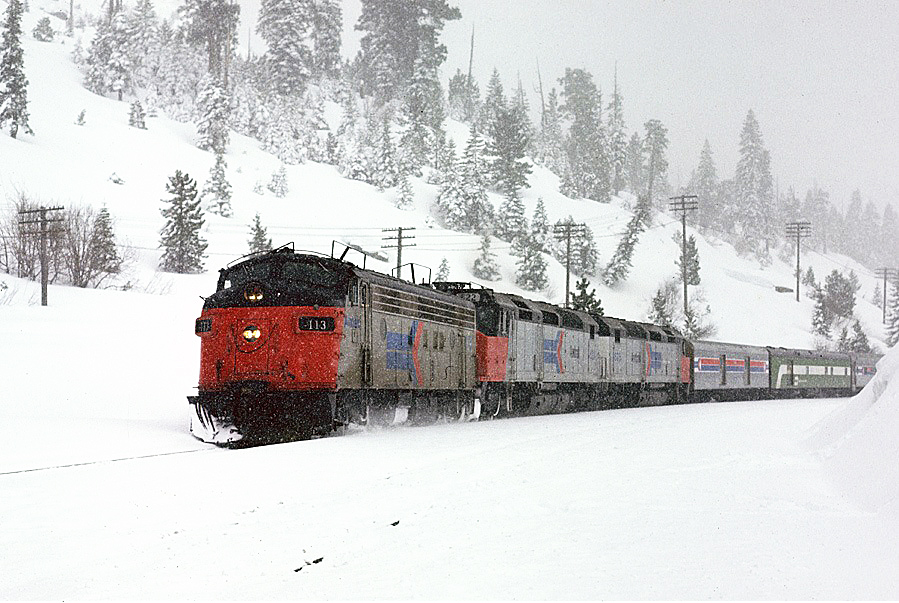
AMTK No. 113, formerly SP No. 6449, leading two EMD SDP40Fs with the San Francisco Zephyr at Yuba Gap, 1975

A total of 378 cab-equipped lead A units were built; unlike the freight series, no cabless booster B units were sold. Regular F7B units were sometimes used with FP7 A units, since they, lacking cabs, had more room for water and steam generators. The FP7 and its successor, the FP9, were offshoots of GM-EMD's highly successful F-unit series of cab unit freight diesel locomotives.

F3s, F7s, and F9s equipped for passenger service are not FP-series locomotives, which, although similar in appearance, have distinctive differences. This includes, but not limited to, the greater body length. The extra 4 ft (1.2 m) of length was added behind the first body-side porthole, and can be recognised by the greater distance between that porthole and the first small carbody filter grille. The corresponding space beneath the body, behind the front truck, was also opened up; this either remained an empty space or was filled with a distinctive water tank shaped like a barrel mounted transversely.

Over their production run, there were numerous detail changes including the style of side grills (notably on Canadian-built units), carbody louvres, and dynamic brake fan sizing (36 in [0.91 m] initially, 48 in [1.2 m] on later production units). Some railroads such as Southern Pacific and Canadian Pacific outfitted their units with rooftop-mounted icicle breakers for protecting dome car windows in mountain territory where icicles formed around the roofs of tunnels.

== Original owners ==
EMD built 378 FP7 locomotives. Major buyers included the Louisville and Nashville Railroad (45), Atlantic Coast Line Railroad (44), Pennsylvania Railroad (40), Canadian Pacific Railway (35), and Milwaukee Road (32). Locomotives intended for use in Canada were built by General Motors Diesel, EMD's Canadian subsidiary. These included the Canadian Pacific's units, and 22 for the Ontario Northland Railway.

== Preserved examples ==
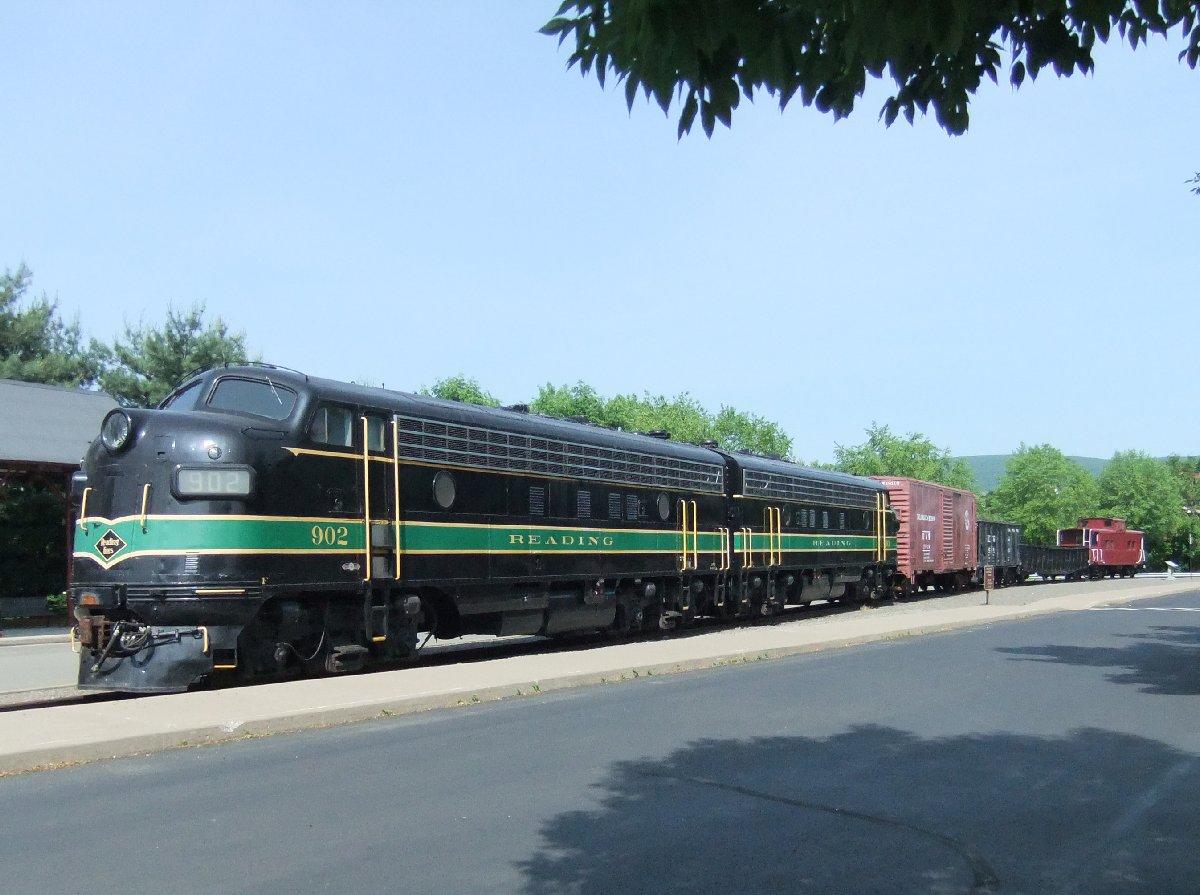
Reading 902 at Steamtown National Historic Site

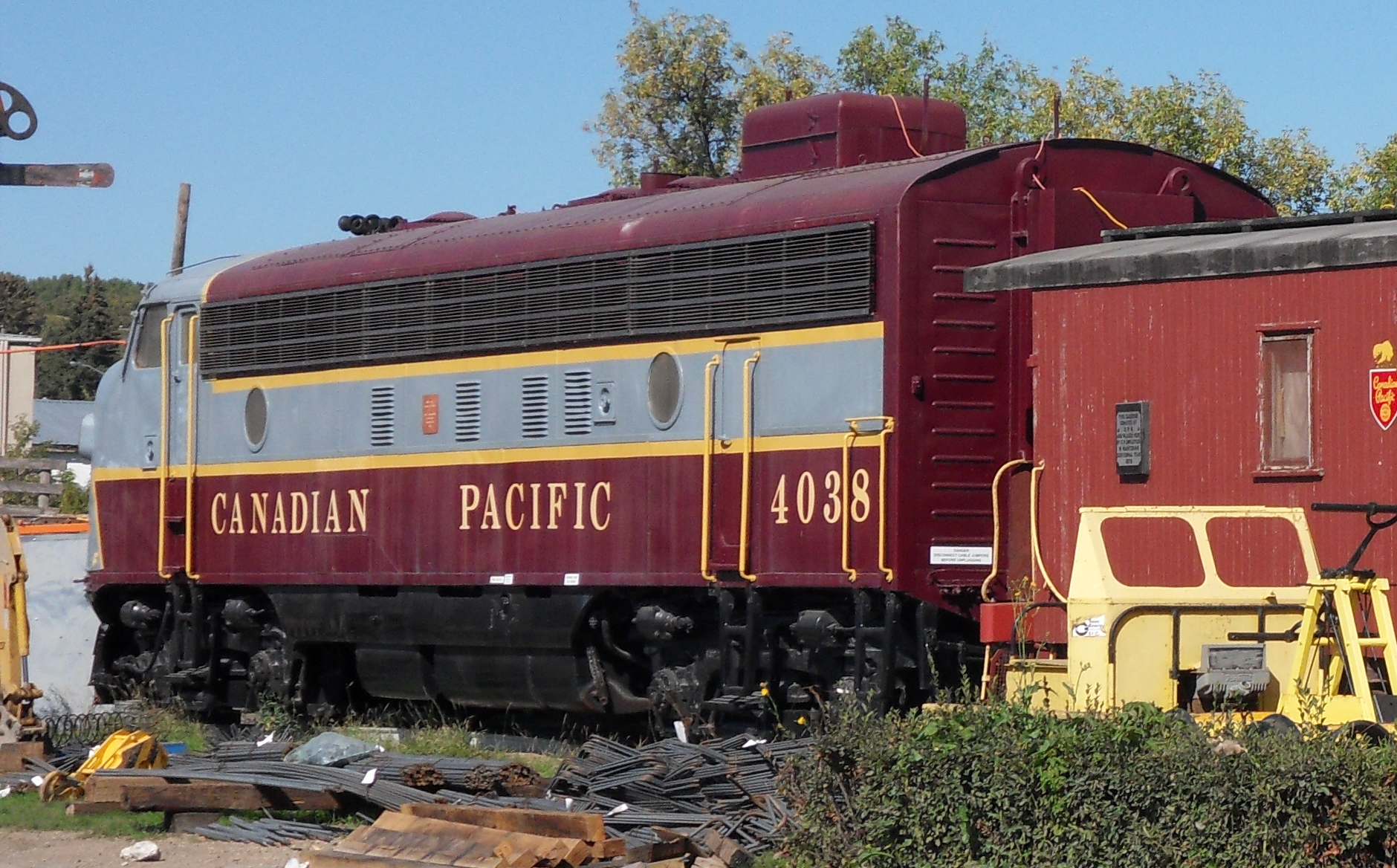
CP 4038 in Minnedosa, Manitoba

- Alaska Railroad 1510 and 1512, used by the Verde Canyon Railroad in Clarkdale, Arizona, on its excursion train.
- Chicago Great Western Railway 116-A, on display, at Hub City Heritage Railroad Museum, Oelwein, Iowa.
- Canadian Pacific Railway 4038, at Minnedosa, MB.
- Canadian Pacific Railway 4040, renumbered as Pennsylvania Railroad 9880, operational on the Stourbridge Line, in Honesdale, PA
- Canadian Pacific Railway 4069, in working condition and in use at the Railway Museum of British Columbia.
- Canadian Pacific Railway 4071, renumbered as Western Maryland Railway 243, in working condition and in use at the Durbin and Greenbrier Valley Railroad.
- Canadian Pacific Railway 4099 was later renumbered 1400. After a stint with Via Rail and Nebkota, it was reacquired by CP and given the number 1400 again. It was retired again in 2007 and is preserved on static display at the company's Ogden headquarters, as CP 1400.
- Clinchfield Railroad 200, renumbered as Western Maryland Railway 67, in working condition and in use at the Durbin and Greenbrier Valley Railroad. It was previously used on the Potomac Eagle Scenic Railroad.
- Milwaukee Road 96A, in use by the Escanaba and Lake Superior Railroad
- Milwaukee Road 96C, in Monon livery, currently owned by the Fort Wayne Railroad Historical Society, is stored inoperable in Wabash, Indiana.
- Milwaukee Road 101A, on static display (was non-operational when acquired but reportedly restored by volunteers to operable condition) in Cresco, Iowa.
- Milwaukee Road 104C, at the Illinois Railway Museum, Union, Illinois.
- Reading Railroad 900, at the Reading Railroad Heritage Museum in Hamburg, Pennsylvania
- Reading Railroad 902 and 903, now at SMS Rail Lines, undergoing restoration.
- Soo Line 500A (né EMD demonstrator #9051), on display at Ladysmith, Wisconsin.
- Soo Line 2500A (né EMD demonstrator #7001), restored to working condition at Lake Superior Railroad Museum, Duluth, Minnesota.
- Southern Railway (CNO&TP) 6133, in working condition at the North Carolina Transportation Museum at Spencer, North Carolina.
- Southern Railway (CNO&TP) 6143 and 6147, in working condition and in use at the Stone Mountain Park at Atlanta.
- Southern Railway (CNO&TP) 6141 and 6138 as RJ Corman 1940 and 1941 in use by the Kentucky Dinner Train operation out of Bardstown, Kentucky.
- Western Pacific 805-A, a locomotive used on the famous California Zephyr, is preserved in operable condition at the Western Pacific Railroad Museum at Portola, California.

== See also ==
- List of GM-EMD locomotives
- List of GMD Locomotives
