= EMD SW1 =

Diesel-electric locomotive manufactured between 1938 and 1953

EMC/EMD SW1
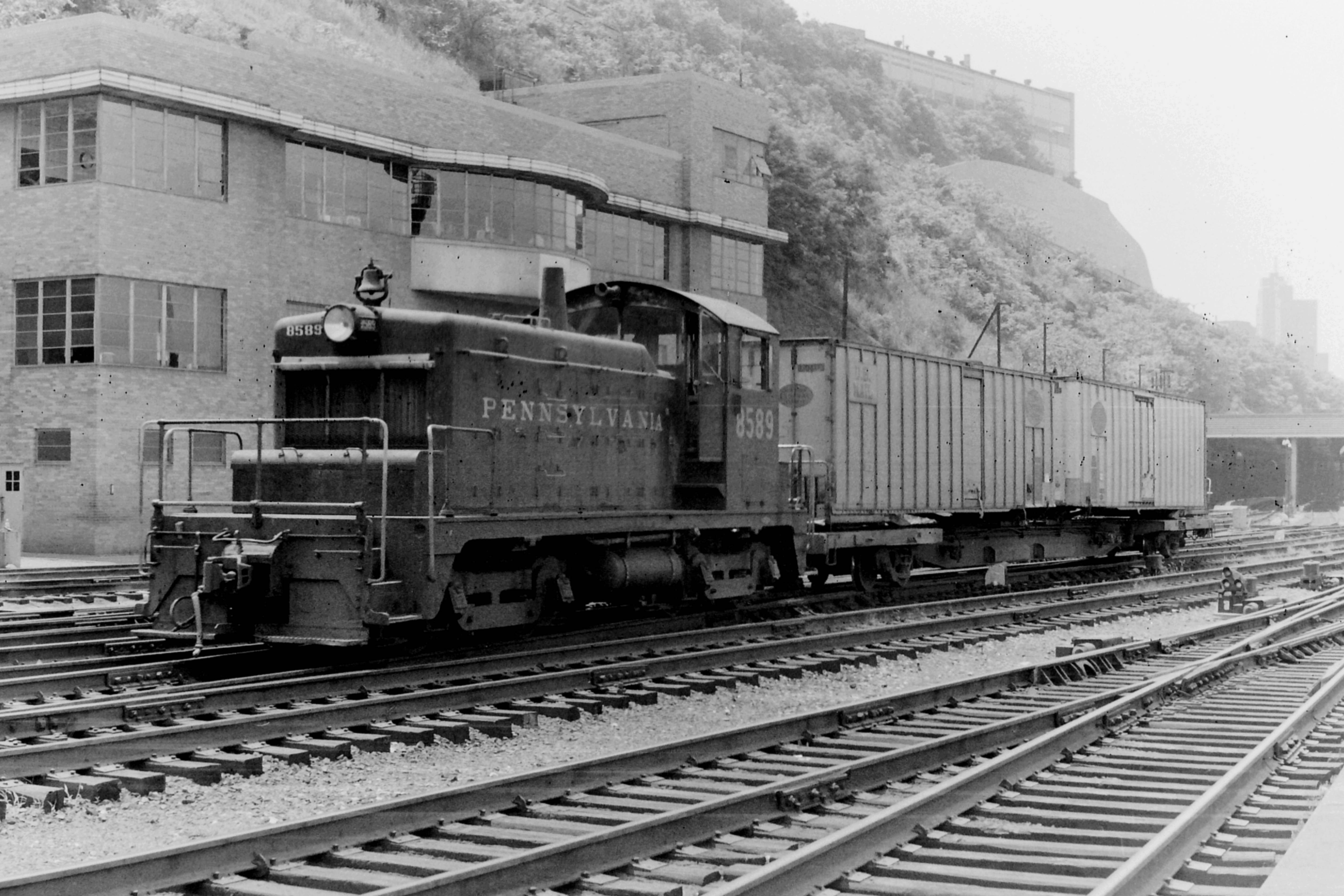
- PC #8589, still in PRR livery, switching at Pittsburgh in 1970
Type and origin
- Power type: Diesel-electric
- Builder: General Motors Electro-Motive Corp (later Division) (EMC/EMD)
- Model: SW1
- Build date: December 1938 – November 1953
- Total produced: 661
Specifications
- Configuration
  - AAR: B-B
- Gauge: 4 ft 8 1/2 in (1,435 mm) standard gauge
- Trucks: AAR Type A or B
- Wheel diameter: 40 in (1,016 mm)
- Minimum curve: 57° (104.79 ft or 31.94 m)
- Wheelbase: 30 ft (9.14 m)
- Length: 44 ft 11 1/4 in (13.70 m)
- Width: 10 ft (3.05 m)
- Height: 14 ft 4 5/8 in (4.38 m)
- Loco weight: 196,000 lb (89,000 kg)
- Prime mover: EMD 6-567B or 6-567A or 6-567AC
- Engine type: V6 2-stroke diesel
- Aspiration: Gear-driven Roots blower
- Displacement: 3,402 cu in (55.75 L)
- Generator: GM D-4
- Traction motors: (4) GM D-7A
- Cylinders: 6
- Cylinder size: 8 1/2 in × 10 in (216 mm × 254 mm)
- Gear ratio: 62:15
Performance figures
- Maximum speed: 65 mph (105 km/h)
- Power output: 600 hp (447 kW)
- Tractive effort: 49,000 lb (22,000 kg)
Career
- Locale: United States; Mexico

The EMD SW1 is a 600-horsepower (450 kW) diesel-electric switcher locomotive built by General Motors' Electro-Motive Corporation (later Division) between December 1938 and November 1953. Final assembly was at EMD's plant at LaGrange (McCook) Illinois. The SW1 was the second generation of 3,402 cu in (55.75 L) switcher from EMD, succeeding the SC (cast frame) and SW (welded frame). The most significant change from those earlier models was the use of an engine of EMD's own design, the then-new 567 engine, here in 600 hp (450 kW) V6 form. 661 locomotives of this design were built, with a gap in production between March 1943 and September 1945 due to World War II.

The SW1 was the start of a long line of SW series switchers produced by EMD. It was complemented by the SW7 in 1949 and the SW8 in 1950. SW1 production ceased in November 1953, with its replacement, the equally powerful SW600, starting production in February 1954.

== Locomotive name ==
EMD arrived at the name SW1 based on the locomotive's power (S for 600 hp) and frame design (W for welded), and the number 1 was added to distinguish the new design from the previous EMD SW. As new and more powerful SW designs emerged in the 1950s, the SW name evolved to instead stand for "switcher."

== Engine and powertrain ==
The SW1 introduced a 6-cylinder version of the 567 (later 567A) series engine to EMC/EMD switchers. Developing 600-horsepower (450 kW) at 800 rpm, this engine remained in production until 1966. Designed specifically for railroad locomotives, this was a mechanically-aspirated, two-stroke, 45 degree V type, with an 8 1/2 by 10 in (216 by 254 mm), bore by stroke, giving 567 cubic inches (9.29 L) displacement per cylinder. A direct current generator provides power to four traction motors, two on each truck, in a B-B arrangement. The SW1, like most EMD switchers, uses the AAR type A switcher truck. EMC/EMD had built all its components since 1939.

== Production changes ==
Several changes were made to the SW1 over its production life. Internally, the post-war locomotives used the 567A engine.

Externally, the two center cab windows over the hood, which were curved to follow the roofline originally, became flat-topped after mid-1950. Another external difference is the taper of the hood to the cab, which was a two-stage taper in earlier units but became a single taper in later production. Very early locomotives were delivered with a stubby exhaust stack, but this did not lift the diesel exhaust sufficiently clear of crew visibility. All later units were delivered with EMD's standard conical switcher stack, while early units were generally modified with taller stacks too. Early locomotives had a single large headlight, while later had twin sealed-beam headlights.

== Original owners ==
Railroad	Quantity	Road numbers	Notes
Allegheny and South Side Railway	1	101	
Allis-Chalmers	1	8	
Angelina and Neches River Railroad	1	10	
Atlantic and East Carolina Railway	1	9	
Atlantic Coast Line Railroad	1	1901	Rejected, to Richmond Terminal Railroad #1
Baltimore and Ohio Railroad	16	200–215	#208, B&O renumbered to #8408, is currently owned by Wilmington & Western Railroad. 2nd youngest SW1 in routine scheduled service.
Baltimore and Ohio Chicago Terminal Railroad	6	216-221	
Boston and Maine Railroad	24	1109–1132	1109 owned by RMNE. Thomaston, CT 1113 owned and operated by BSRM, Adams/Lenox, MA. 1127 preserved by the Danbury Railway Museum in Danbury, CT.
Broward County Port Authority	1	400	
Buffalo Creek Railroad	1	42	
Canton Railroad	5	21–25	
Central Indiana Railroad	1	1	
Central of Georgia Railroad	3	2, 3, 7	
Central Railroad of New Jersey	4	1009–1012	
Chattanooga Traction Company	1	4	
Chicago and Eastern Illinois Railroad	5	95–99	99 to MP 6001, now Dardanelle & Russellville 16
Chicago and North Western Railway	20	1207–1212, 1214, 1215, 1268–1279	
Chicago District Electric Generating	2	3, 4	
Chicago Short Line Railway	2	200–201	
Chicago, Burlington and Quincy Railroad	18	9136–9153	
Chicago, Indianapolis and Louisville Railroad	3	DS-50, 5, 6	DS-50 renumbered to 1
Chicago, Milwaukee, St. Paul and Pacific Railroad	25	1610–1634	renumbered
Chicago, St. Paul, Minneapolis and Omaha Railway	1	55	
Chihuahua Forests	1	500	only SW1 exported
Cleveland Quarries	1	2	built with a 567AC engine. Last SW1 built.
Commonwealth Edison	6	10–15	
Conemaugh and Black Lick Railroad	6	60–65	
Delaware, Lackawanna and Western Railroad	11	427–437	
Detroit Edison	3	210–212	
Detroit, Toledo and Ironton Railroad	2	900–901	re-engined with 8-567B 800 hp engines, new hoods 1952. Reclassified SW8.
Donner-Hanna Coke	1	1	
Elgin, Joliet and Eastern Railroad	27	220–246	
EMD (demonstrator units)	7	755, 804, 905, 906, 911, 700, 152	EMC 755 was the first SW1
Erie Railroad	1	360	
Fort Worth and Denver Railway	2	602, 604	
Fort Worth Belt	1	1	
Galveston Wharves	5	201–205	201 to Dardanelle & Russellville 15
Garden City Western Railway	1	201	
Georgia and Florida Railroad	3	70–72	
Georgia Marble Company	1	1	
Granite City Steel	2	600–601	
Great Lakes Steel	14	12, 14–18, 22, 30, 31, 33–36, 38	
Great Northern Railway	9	5101–5105, 80–83	5101–5105 renumbered to 75-79. Then to Burlington Northern 75-83. 77 was sold to Walla Walla Valley in 1975.
Great Western Railway of Colorado	1	61	
Hanna Furnace Company	3	14–16	
Houston Belt and Terminal Railway	1	10	
Illinois Central Railroad	19	9014–9032	
Inland Steel Company	12	54, 57, 70–73, 76–81	
Lehigh Portland Cement Company	1	5	
Lehigh Valley Railroad	6	112–115, 118-119	#114 is currently owned by Wilmington & Western Railroad. Oldest SW1 in routine scheduled service.
Louisiana Midland Railway	1	11	
Louisville and Nashville Railroad	5	11–15	
Manufacturers' Junction Railway	1	6	
Maryland and Pennsylvania Railroad	1	70	To Republic Steel 326, 1959; to Nimishillen & Tuscarawas 326, 1995.
Mathieson Chemical	2	1–2	
McLouth Steel	3	3–5	
Memphis Union Station	1	10	
Metropolitan Sanitary District of Greater Chicago	3	1–3	
Missouri Pacific Railroad	10	9004–9006, 9011, 9200–9205	
Nashville, Chattanooga and St. Louis Railway	1	15	
New York Central Railroad	103	600–621 (first), 622–654, 574–599, 600–621 (second)	609 (2nd) is now WRIX 1001, located on RVT - White City, OR
Nickel Plate Road	2	105–106	#106 is now Independent Locomotive Services #920
Pennsylvania Railroad	85	5910, 5944–5953, 5987–5999, 9104, 9137–9154, 9200–9203, 9205-9209, 9396–9428	
Pere Marquette Railroad	2	10–11	
Phelps Dodge Corporation	1	A	
Philadelphia, Bethlehem and New England Railroad	9	212–218, 220, 221	
Public Service Company of Northern Illinois	3	9–11	
Portland Traction Company (Oregon)	2	100, 200	100 is currently owned, restored to as delivered and operated by Oregon Pacific Railroad on its original home rails.
Reading Railroad	9	16–24	
Republic Steel	22	50–54, 300–306, 340–341, 352, 370–372, 890–891, 893–894	
Chicago, Rock Island and Pacific Railroad	18	529–546	536 operational as AOK 536. Serial number 1685 build 4/42
Roscoe, Snyder and Pacific Railway	1	100	
Sahara Coal Company	1	(no numbers)	
Seaboard Air Line Railroad	1	1200	
Soo Line Railroad	1	320	
Southern Railway	9	2002–2004, 2007–2011, 8565	
Southern Pacific Railroad	15	11, 1000, 1004–1016	11 is Texas & New Orleans
St. Joseph Belt Railroad	1	12	
St. Joseph Terminal Railroad	2	1–2	
Tennessee Coal and Iron Railroad	4	1000–1003	
Terminal Railroad Association of St Louis	8	501–508	
Union Railroad	22	455–476	
US Department of Defense (US Army)	4	7001–7004	to Alaska 1203, 1201-1202, 1204
Wabash Railroad	11	101–111	Two units acquired by Tulsa-Sapulpa Union Railway, now in service as Numbers 101 & 102.
Warner Sand and Gravel Company	1	15	
Western Pacific Railroad	2	502–503	WP 501 was ex-EMC 906
Wheeling Steel Company	4	1001–1004	
Total	661		

- There were 7 units built as EMD demonstrators: #152 (to Scullin Steel #6), 700 (to Manufacturers' Junction Railway #7), 755 (to Inland Steel #51), 804 (to Southern Pacific Railroad #1000, pictured above), 905 (to Central of Georgia #1), 906 (to Western Pacific Railroad #501), 911 (to Great Lakes Steel #11)
- Owego and Harford Railway was still operating one SW1 for switching duties in their yard as of 2010, sitting derelict in a railyard in Owego, NY, as of 2019
- As of 2013, Amtrak still has one SW1 on their roster. #737 is used for switching chores at the Wilmington Delaware shops.
- As of 2021, Metra commuter rail rosters one SW1. It is used for Yard Service and power on work trains on the Metra Electric and Rock Island lines. It was originally built in 1945 for the Rock Island. Metra used to operate a second SW1, built in 1939, but sold it in June 2021 via online auction for $45,000 due to an internal engine failure. The unit built in 1939 was rumored to be one of the oldest operating diesels in Illinois and the oldest operating locomotive in the U.S. that was not preserved.

== Preservation ==
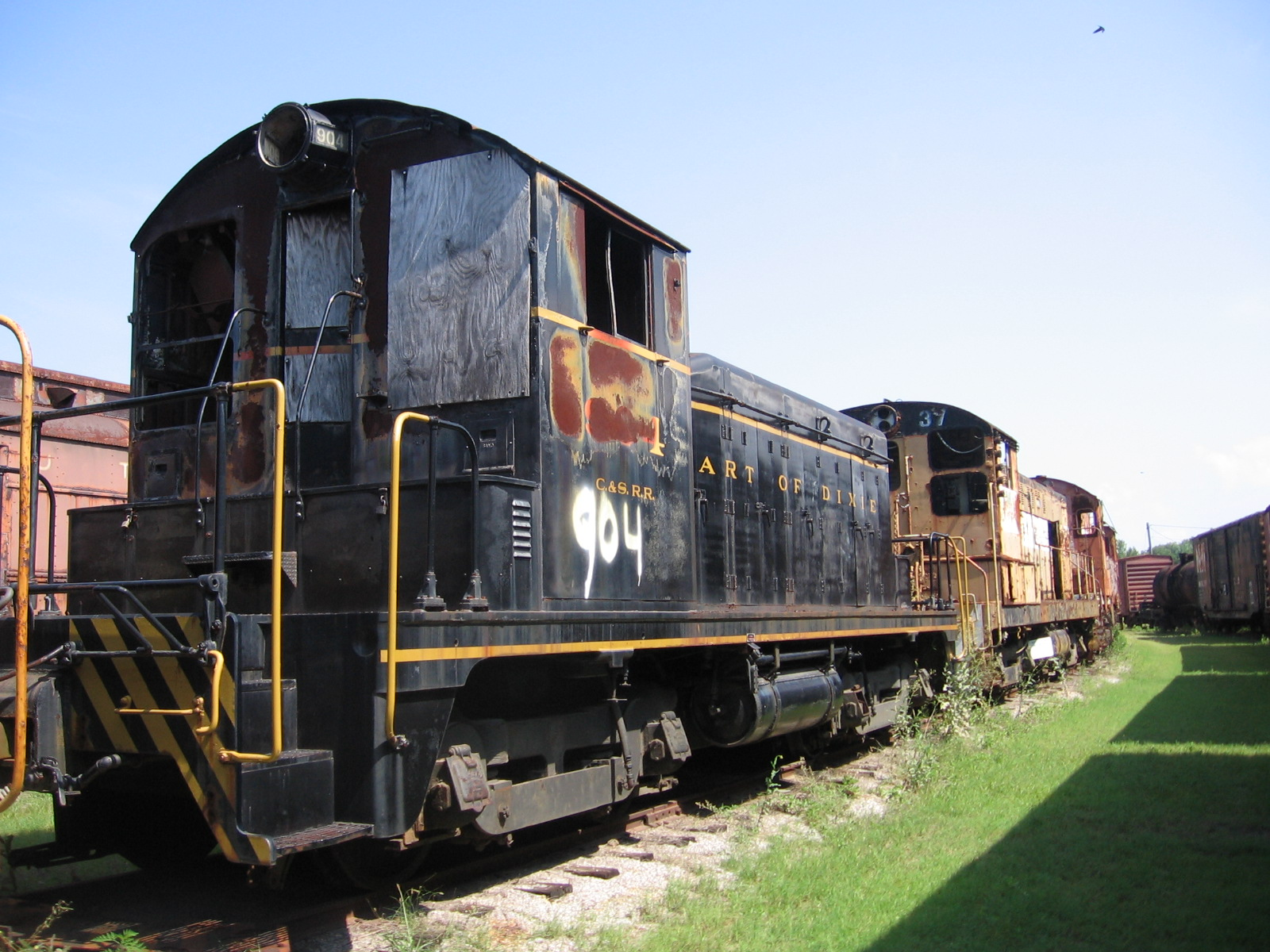
An SW1 at the Heart of Dixie Railroad Museum in Calera, Alabama.

- Andersen Windowalls 3110 is preserved in operational condition at the Minnesota Transportation Museum. It was previously Norfolk and Western Railway 3110 and originally Wabash Railroad 110, built in June 1949.
- Arkansas–Oklahoma Railroad 536 is in operational condition and in regular freight service. It was previously Chicago, Rock Island and Pacific 536 and is painted in a Rock Island inspired paint scheme.
- Ballard Terminal Railroad 98 is one of the few SW1's operating in revenue freight service. It was originally Milwaukee Road 1619, and was for a time on the Seattle and North Coast Railroad as number 52.
- Baltimore and Ohio 8408 & Lehigh Valley 114 are preserved at the Wilmington and Western Railroad in operational condition.
- Billings Grain Terminal 84, built as Chicago, Burlington and Quincy 9139 in 1939, was purchased by railroad operator and leasing firm St Johns River Companies in 2022 with the goal of restoring the locomotive into operating condition. After the formation of the Burlington Northern in 1970, 9139 was renumbered to 84, where it served for 5 years before being sold to the Davenport, Rock Island and Northwestern. In 1984, the locomotive was sold to a grain elevator in Billings, MT where it remains today.
- Black River and Western Railroad Lehigh Valley 112, is preserved on the BR&W in operational condition.
- Boston and Maine 1109 is preserved at the Railroad Museum of New England.
- Boston and Maine 1127 has been acquired by the Danbury Railway Museum.
- BRMX 1849, built as Boston and Maine 1113, is preserved at the Berkshire Scenic Railway, in Lenox, MA.

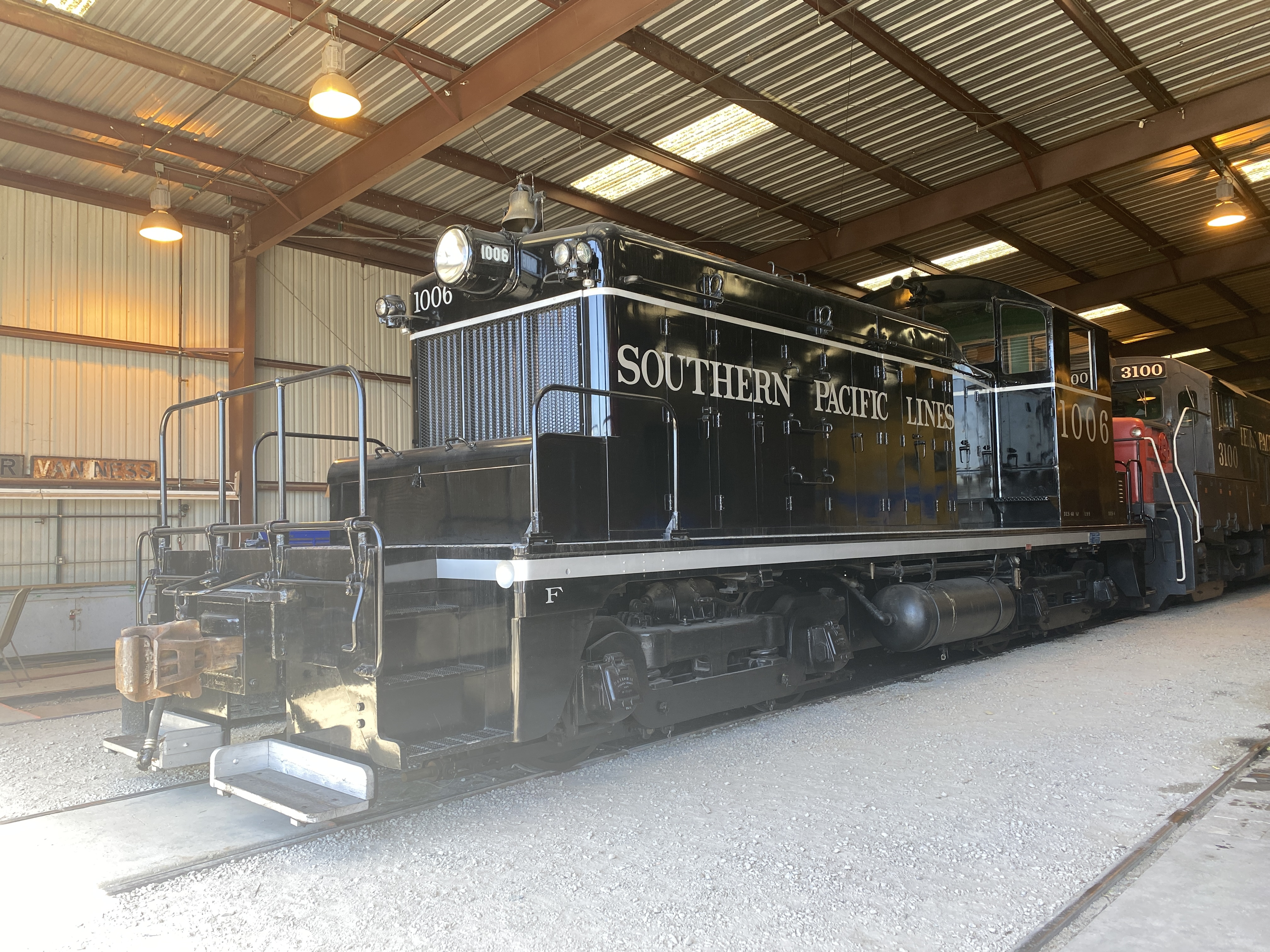
Southern Pacific 1006 operates at the Southern California Railway Museum.

- Cargill 6751, built in 1940 with construction number 1111, was one of the first SW1s that Electro-Motive built. After buying the unit, the Baltimore and Ohio Railroad (B&O) initially numbered the locomotive as No. 213, but subsequently changed the number to 8413. Leased by the Washington and Old Dominion Railroad in 1968, B&O 8413 was one of the last locomotives to operate on the W&OD before the railroad closed during the same year. After several transfers of ownership, the locomotive was acquired by Cargill, becoming Cargill No. 6751. Cargill moved the locomotive to Ogden, Utah in 1993 for use in the company's Globe Mill. Following Cargill's donation of the locomotive in 2010, the Utah Central Railway and the Union Pacific Railroad delivered it on May 21, 2011, to the Utah State Railroad Museum for display at Union Station in Ogden.
- Commonwealth Edison 15 is preserved at the Illinois Railway Museum. This unit is in operating condition and is one of the most frequently used diesels on the property.
- Dardanelle & Russellville 16, built as Chicago & Eastern Illinois 99 and later Missouri Pacific 6001, is still in operation on the D&R.
- Eureka Springs & North Arkansas 4742, built as Chicago & Eastern Illinois 98 in 1942, still in operation on this excursion line.
- Heart of Dixie 904, built as Memphis Union Station 10, is preserved at the Heart of Dixie Railroad Museum.
- Holly Sugar 1, the first SW1 built by EMC in 1939 is now preserved at the California State Railroad Museum in Sacramento, California. Built as Southern Pacific Lines 1000, the locomotive worked for the SP until its retirement in the 1970’s, then was sold to Holly Sugar and renumbered to 1. The museum donation was a coordinated effort between the museum, the Pacific Coast Chapter of the Railway and Locomotive Historical Society and Spreckels Sugar (the locomotive's last owner).
- Louisville & Nashville 13 is on display at the Foley Railroad Museum in Foley, AL.
- Milwaukee Road 1626 is preserved at the Milwaukee Road Heritage Center. It was formerly Northern States Power X-5, Ex-Burlington Northern 79, Exx- Chicago Burlington & Quincy 9137. Built in June 1939, the locomotive is in running condition, with its original Electro-Motive Division 6-567B-1 Prime Mover.
- Monon Railroad 50, the first diesel locomotive owned by the Monon, is leased to the Hoosier Valley Railroad Museum. It was damaged in the move to the new home of the Indiana Transportation Museum in Logansport, Indiana. ITM also had Milwaukee Road 1613, but it was scrapped in July 2018. The locomotive was moved from Logansport, Indiana to the Hoosier Valley Railroad Museum in North Judson, Indiana in April 2021, where it will be repaired and will join the HVRM's fleet of vintage diesel locomotives.
- New York Central 705, built as Louisville and Nashville 14, is preserved in operational condition at the Adirondack Scenic Railroad.
- Northern States Power 4 is preserved in operational condition at the Gopher State Railway Museum. It was originally built as CB&Q 9146 in May 1940.
- Peabody Coal Company 470 (Former Delaware, Lackawanna and Western #436) is on static display at the Museum of the Coal Industry in Lynnville, Indiana.
- Pennsylvania Railroad 9206 is preserved in operational condition on the Black River and Western Railroad.
- Pennsylvania Railroad 9408 is preserved in operational condition at the Railway Museum of Greater Cincinnati.
- Pere Marquette Railway 11 is preserved at the Baltimore & Ohio Railroad Museum, in Baltimore, MD, in operating condition at last report.
- Portland Traction Company 100 is preserved in operational condition at the Oregon Rail Heritage Center, and is the only preserved former interurban diesel locomotive to retain the trolley poles.
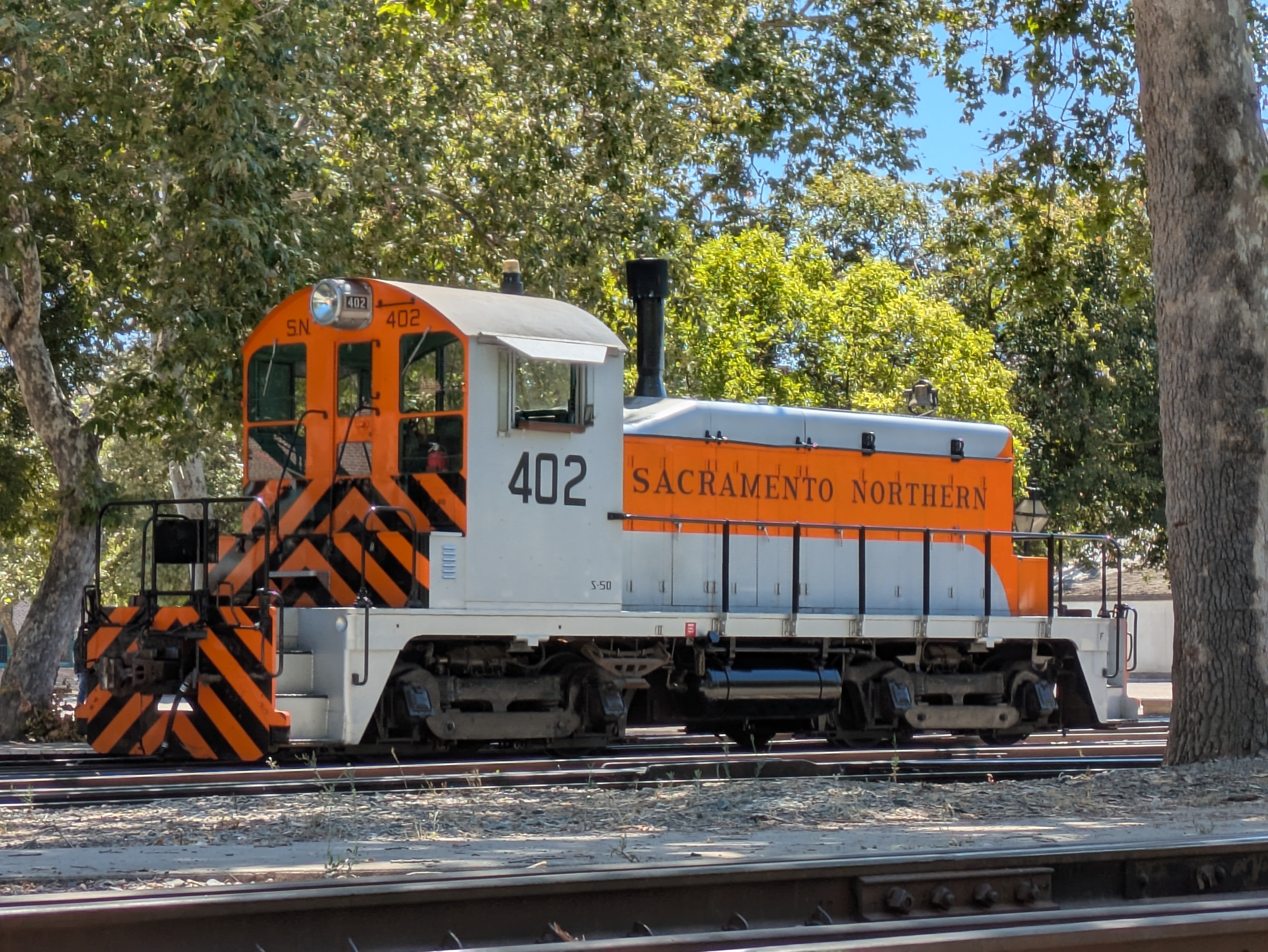
  Sacramento Northern 402 at the California State Railroad Museum
- Sacramento Northern 402, originally built as Western Pacific 502, is preserved at the California State Railroad Museum.
- SMS Rail Service 9423, former Pennsylvania Railroad 9423, is in storage in Bridgeport, NJ.
- Southern Pacific Lines 1006 is preserved in operational condition, restored to its as-built appearance. It resides at the Southern California Railway Museum, (formerly known as the Orange Empire Railway Museum) and frequently pulls passenger trains for museum visitors.
- Western Pacific Railroad 501, originally built as EMC demonstrator 906, is preserved at the Western Pacific Railroad Museum at Portola, CA. This locomotive was the Western Pacific's first diesel-electric engine.
- Used locomotive dealer/lessor Western Rail, Inc. owns WRIX 1001 (built 06/1949 as NYC # 609 (2nd), later renumbered NYC 8435, PC 8435, CR 8435, GE Sayre Repair Shop # 2, IRLX 1006, IRLX 1001, WCTR 1001).
- The Zanesville & Western Scenic Railroad 8599, former PRR 5999, operations excursions on its scenic line in Fultonham, Ohio.
- Dura-Bond (former owner of Turtle Creek Industrial Railroad) operates 462 at its pipe mill in McKeesport, PA. It is well maintained and operates as a switcher on about 7 miles of private track.

== See also ==
- List of GM-EMD locomotives
