= Western Pacific 805-A =

Railroad locomotive

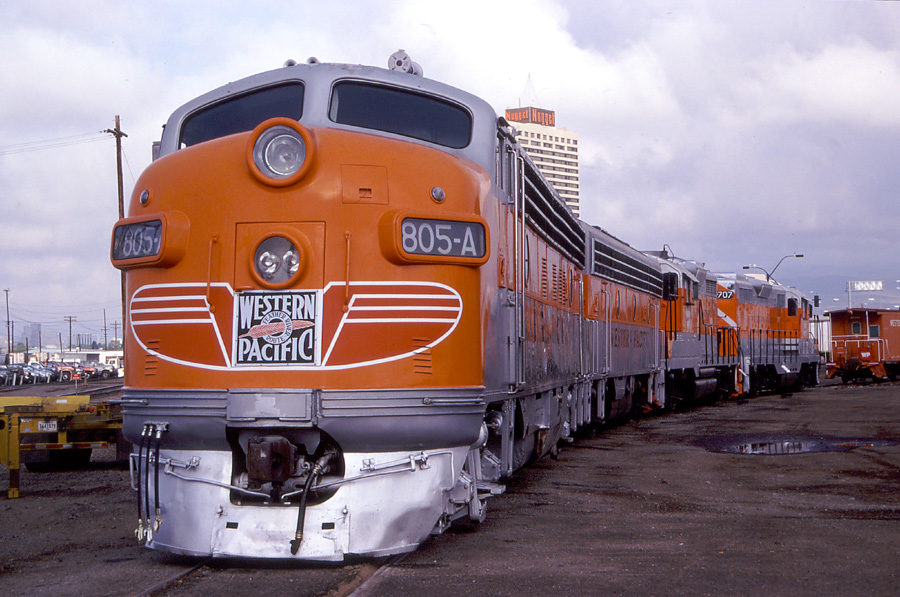
- Western Pacific 805-A parked in Sparks, Nevada in 2004
Type and origin
- Power type: Diesel
- Builder: General Motors Electro-Motive Division (EMD)
- Order number: 6043
- Serial number: 9004
- Model: FP7
Specifications
- Configuration
  - AAR: B-B
- Gauge: 4 ft 8 1/2 in (1,435 mm)
- Trucks: Blomberg B
- Wheel diameter: 40 in (1,016 mm)
- Minimum curve: 23° (250.79 ft or 76.44 m radius)
- Wheelbase: 43 ft (13.11 m)
- Length: 55 ft 2 1/4 in (16.82 m)
- Width: 10 ft 8 in (3.25 m)
- Height: 15 ft (4.57 m)
- Loco weight: 260,000 lb (120,000 kg)
- Fuel capacity: 1,200 US gal (4,500 L; 1,000 imp gal)
- Prime mover: EMD 567B
- RPM range: 800
- Engine type: Two-stroke V16 diesel
- Aspiration: Roots-type supercharger
- Generator: EMD D-12
- Traction motors: (4) EMD D-27-B
- Cylinders: 16
- Cylinder size: 8 1/2 in × 10 in (216 mm × 254 mm)
Performance figures
- Power output: 1,500 horsepower (1,100 kW)
Career
- Operators: Western Pacific Railroad
- Delivered: January 1950
- Retired: 1972
- Current owner: Feather River Rail Society
- Disposition: operational, Portola, California

Western Pacific 805-A is a preserved EMD FP7 diesel-electric railroad locomotive built by the Electro-Motive Division of General Motors. It was mainly used to pull passenger trains, specifically the California Zephyr (CZ), which was operated jointly by the Western Pacific, Denver and Rio Grande Western, and the Chicago, Burlington and Quincy Railroads. It later worked for several short line railroads before preservation at the Western Pacific Railroad Museum at Portola, California.

== History ==
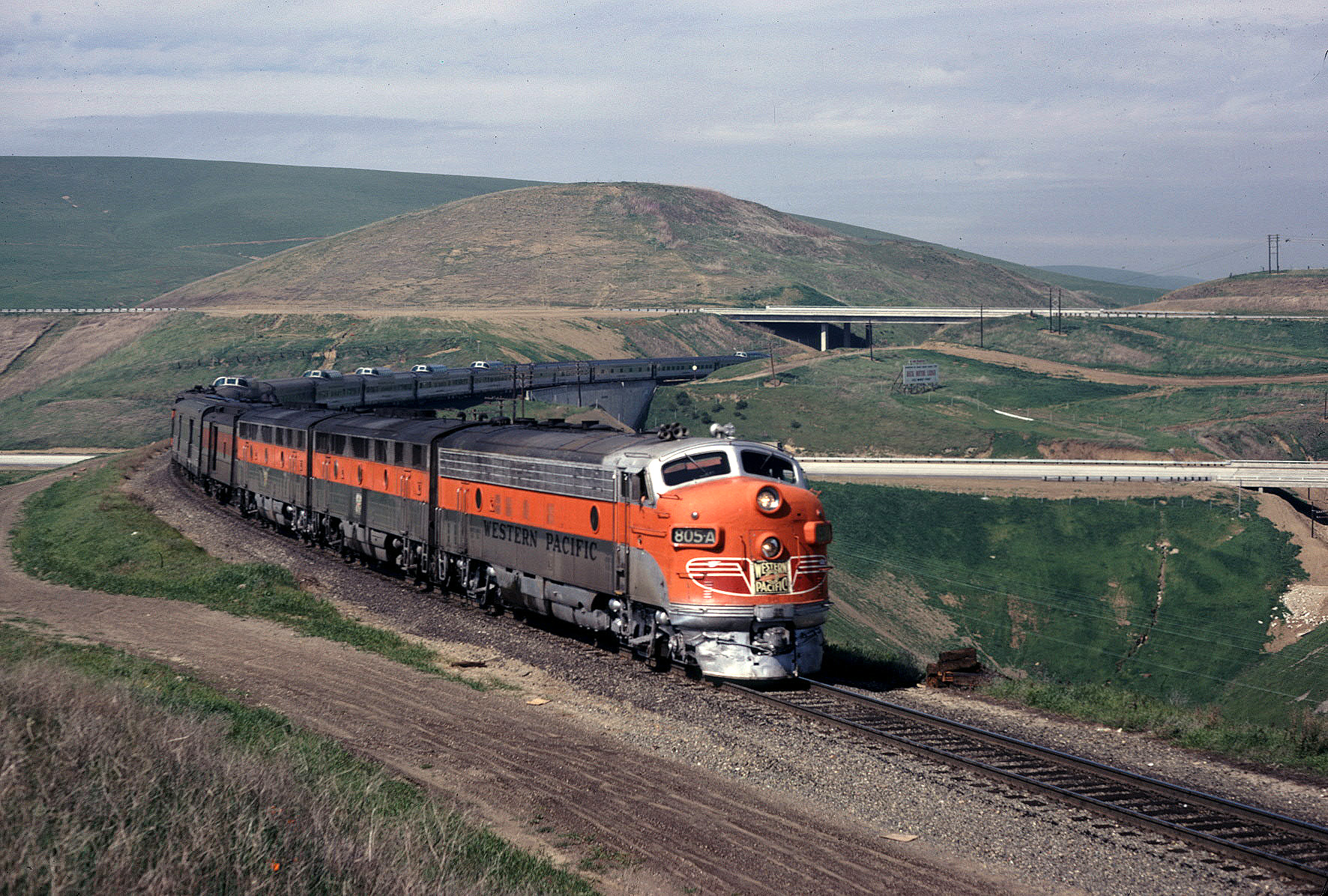
In service with the California Zephyr, 1970

WP 805-A was purchased to power Western Pacific Railroad's portion of the California Zephyr run less than one year after the train began on March 20, 1949. The 805-A was built in 1950 as part of an order by WP for 6 new passenger locomotives: 4 cab equipped A units numbered 804-A, 804-C, 805-A and 805-C, and 2 B units numbered 804-B and 805-B. These locomotives supplemented WP's existing fleet of F3 models, which were the original power for the CZ train.

This cab unit, which would be joined by two cabless B units in a typical CZ motive power set, hauled the train from Oakland, California, to Salt Lake City, Utah, from 1950 until March 22, 1970, when the CZ ended. The 805-A was then placed into freight service.

In 1972, WP purchased 15 General Electric U23B locomotives and turned in the 805-A for credit toward their purchase. GE sold the unit to the Wellsville, Addison and Galeton Railroad in Pennsylvania. After that railroad was abandoned in 1977, the 805-A was transferred to the Louisiana and North West Railroad in Louisiana. All other CZ engines from the Western Pacific were traded in to builder EMD and scrapped.

The Feather River Rail Society (FRRS) wanted this locomotive for its Western Pacific Railroad collection as it had become the last WP California Zephyr locomotive in existence. Arrangements were made to purchase the locomotive in 1987 with the cost shared between members Steve Habeck, Larry Hanlon, and John Ryczkowski. FRRS joined as the fourth partner in the purchase.

The 805-A was cosmetically restored by Bill Evans and David Dewey. With this work completed, a rededication ceremony was held on May 27, 1995.

In early 2000, the FRRS launched the Zephyr Project to raise money for a complete mechanical restoration of the 805-A and restoration of the CZ dome car Silver Hostel. In 2004, the locomotive returned to limited operation. The 805-A is the last, intact locomotive built specifically for the CZ.

After being sidelined since 2020, the FRRS announced that 805-A would be repaired, with the hope of returning the locomotive to active service by 2027.
