= GE U30B =

Diesel-electric locomotive

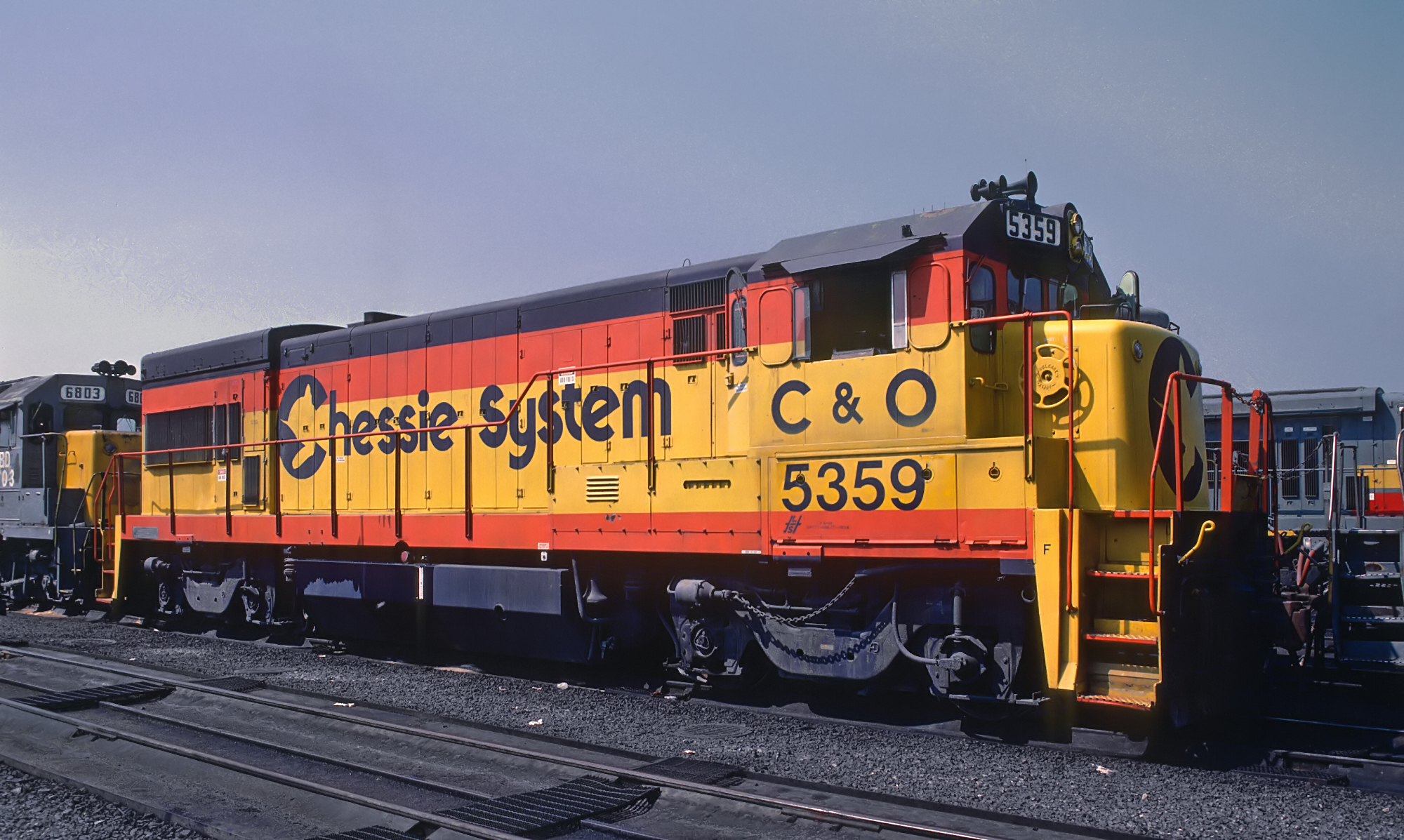
- CSX 5359, A U30B at Atlanta, Georgia, in June 1987.
Type and origin
- Power type: Diesel-electric
- Builder: GE Transportation Systems
- Model: U30B
- Build date: May 1966 – March 1975
- Total produced: 295
Specifications
- Configuration
  - AAR: B-B
  - UIC: Bo'Bo'
- Gauge: 4 ft 8 1/2 in (1,435 mm)
- Prime mover: GE FDL-16
- Engine type: V16 diesel
- Cylinders: 16
Performance figures
- Power output: 3,000 hp (2,200 kW)

The GE U30B was a diesel-electric locomotive produced by GE Transportation between 1966 and 1975. It was a further development of the U28B, with a 3,000 hp (2,200 kW) 16-cylinder prime mover. The U30B competed with the EMD GP40 and the ALCO Century 430, but was not as successful as the GE U30C.

== Original owners ==
Image	Railroad	Quantity	Numbers	Notes
	Atlantic Coast Line Railroad	4	975-978	Blomberg trucks
	Chesapeake and Ohio Railway	33	8200-8222, 8225-8234	8223-8224 former GE demonstrators
	Chicago, Burlington and Quincy Railroad	5	150-154	to Burlington Northern 5480-5484
	Chicago, Milwaukee, St. Paul and Pacific Railroad	5	6005–6009	renumbered 5605-5609
	General Electric (demonstrator units)	4	301-304	301-302 to C&O 8223-8224, 303-304 to WP 770-771
	Illinois Central Railroad	6	5000-5005	
	Louisville & Nashville Railroad	5	2505-2509	
	New York Central Railroad	58	2830-2857, 2860-2889	to Penn Central, Conrail 2830-2857, 2860-2889
	Norfolk and Western Railway	110	1930-1964, 8465-8539	High-nose
	St. Louis - San Francisco Railway	31	832-862	to Burlington Northern 5770-5799
	Seaboard Air Line Railroad	15	800-814	Blomberg trucks
	Western Pacific Railroad	19	751-769	770-771 former GE demonstrators, all with Blomberg trucks

== Preservation ==
- Western Pacific #3051 is preserved at the Western Pacific Railroad Museum in Portola, California. It was donated by the Union Pacific in 1985.
