= Pend Oreille Valley Railroad =

Pend Orielle Valley Railroad
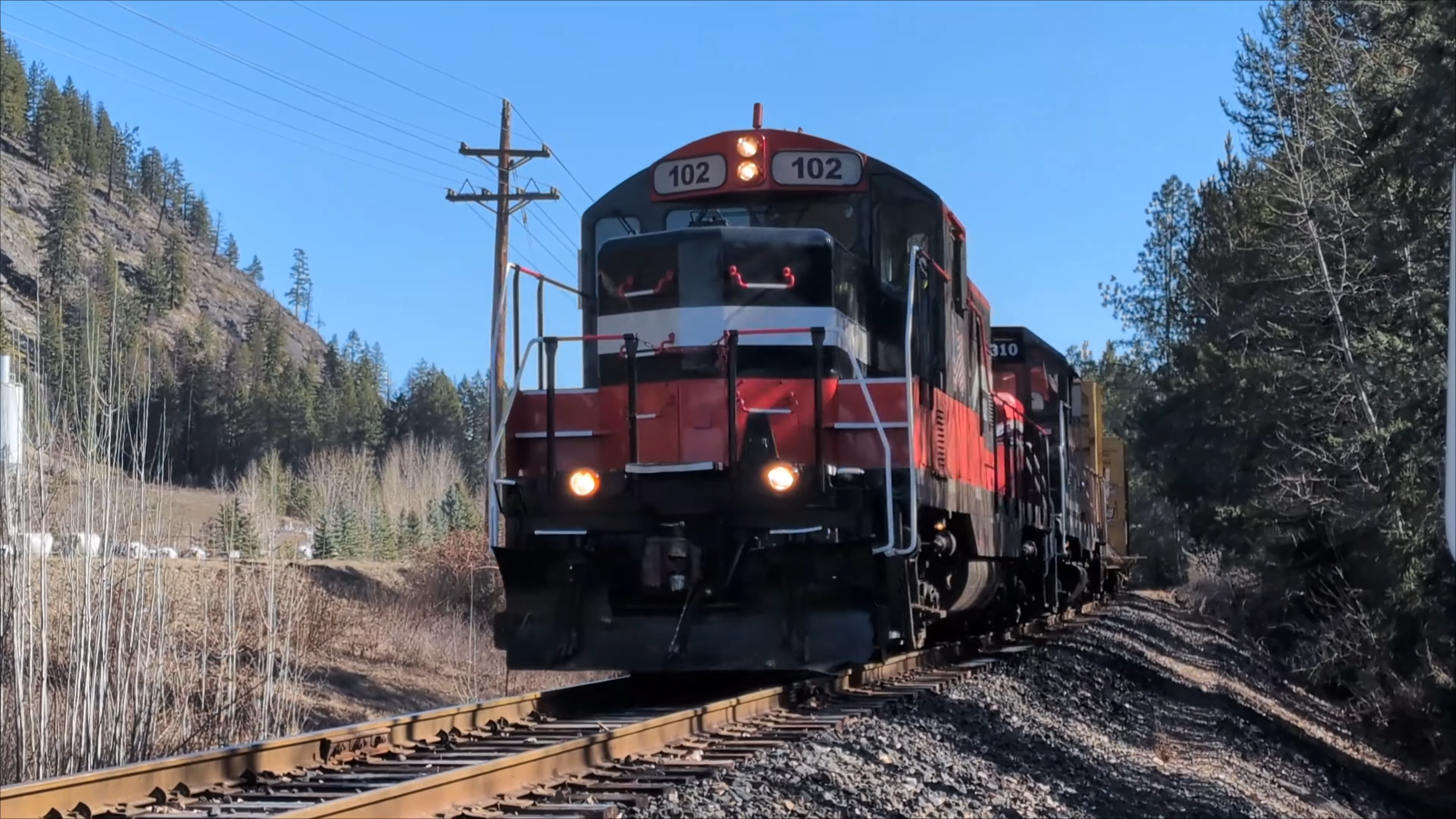
- Pend Orielle Valley Railroad GP9 #102 on March 2, 2026

Overview
- Headquarters: Newport
- Reporting mark: POVA
- Locale: Eastern Washington; Northern Idaho
- Dates of operation: 1979–present
- Predecessor: Milwaukee Road

Technical
- Track gauge: 4 ft 8 1/2 in (1,435 mm)
- Length: 41 miles (66 km)

Other
- Website: http://povarr.com

The Pend Oreille Valley Railroad (reporting mark POVA) is a shortline railroad located in Usk, in northeast Washington.

== History ==
The line was built by the Idaho and Washington Northern Railroad between 1907 and 1911. The Chicago, Milwaukee, St. Paul and Pacific Railroad (MILW) acquired the line in 1916.

The MILW entered financial difficulty in the 1970s and the Newport - Metaline Falls section was sold to Port of Pend Oreille following the company's downsizing. The Port of Pend Oreille established the Pend Oreille Valley Railroad and contracted railroad holding company Kyle Railways to manage the POVA.

Freight service began on October 1, 1979, and the Port of Pend Oreille took over the POVA's management from Kyle Railways in 1984. On March 3, 1998, the Newport - Dover section was acquired (leased?) from BNSF, along with 7 miles of trackage rights between Dover and the interchange yard at North Sandpoint.

== Route ==
The POVA serves the communities of Usk, Dalkena, Newport, Oldtown, Priest River, Laclede and has trackage rights from Dover-Sandpoint via the Union Pacific Railroad.

The Route from Usk to Newport is former Milwaukee Road trackage and Newport-Dover is former Great Northern RY trackage.

The line used to go to Metaline Falls but was abandoned north of Usk in 2016

== Heritage railroad ==
Beginning in 1981, the North Pend Oreille Valley Lions Club worked with the POVA to operate a seasonal excursion train service on several weekends in the summer and fall.

The 20-mile (32 km) round trip ran from Ione to Metaline Falls along the spectacular Box Canyon, passing through several tunnels and crossing several bridges and wooden trestles. The passenger cars consisted of 3 standard coaches as well as 3 open-air cars and a caboose with some equipment borrowed from the Inland NW Railway Historical Society.

Financial issues caused the excursion train service to cease operations in October 2016, as upkeep and inspections became cost prohibitive. The local Rotary Club sponsored a new excursion train on a 9-mile (14 km) route from Newport to Dalkena that debuted in 2017.

== See also ==
- List of heritage railroads in the United States
