= GE U25B =

Diesel electric locomotive, 1959–1966

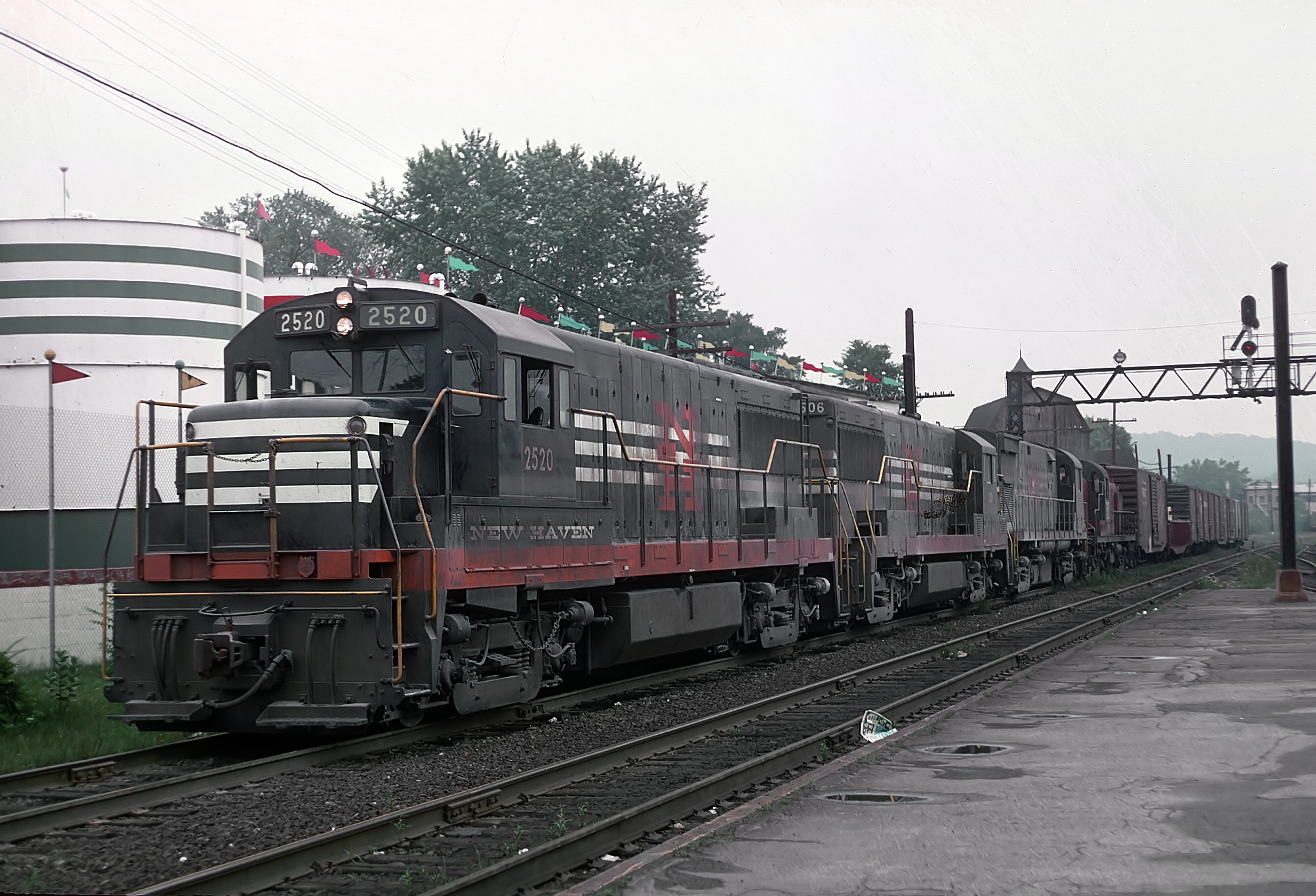
- New Haven Railroad GE U25Bs at Danbury, Connecticut on July 28, 1968.
Type and origin
- Power type: Diesel-electric
- Builder: GE Transportation Systems
- Model: U25B
- Build date: April 1960 – February 1966
- Total produced: 478
Specifications
- Configuration
  - AAR: B-B
  - UIC: Bo'Bo'
- Gauge: 4 ft 8 1/2 in (1,435 mm) standard gauge
- Prime mover: GE FDL-16
- Transmission: Diesel electric
Performance figures
- Power output: 2,500 hp (1,900 kW)
Career
- Operators: Names listed below
- Nicknames: The Original U-boat
- Disposition: most scrapped, six preserved

The GE U25B is General Electric's first independent entry into the United States domestic road switcher diesel-electric locomotive railroad market for heavy production road locomotives since 1936. From 1940 through 1953, GE participated in a design, production, and marketing consortium (Alco-GE) for diesel-electric locomotives with the American Locomotive Company. In 1956 the GE Universal Series of diesel locomotives was founded for the export market. The U25B was the first attempt at the domestic market since its termination of the consortium agreement with Alco.

== History ==
The U25B (nicknamed U-Boat) is the first commercially successful domestic diesel electric road locomotive designed, built, and sold by General Electric after its split with the American Locomotive Company (Alco), a company dating back to the steam era. GE had developed internal combustion-electric generating, control, and drive systems in the early 1920s, which provided the foundation for the use of internal combustion engines in railroading. Early applications were in motorized railcars and switch engines. The 1930s saw that technology adapted to high speed mainline locomotives. In 1940 GE partnered with Alco, who by that time were well-established as a manufacturer of diesel switch engines and were introducing their first diesel road locomotives. They were successful in building locomotives for switching and short-haul applications, having introduced the first road-switcher design in 1941 (which would supplant the carbody design developed by the Electro-Motive Corporation by the mid-1950s) and gained a 26% market share as of 1946. Alco-GE's efforts in main line road locomotives had not been successful at breaking into EMD's dominant position in that market, although they introduced a successful gas turbine-electric locomotive to market in 1952. In 1953 GE went independent from Alco in locomotive production, with their new subsidiary GE Rail taking over the gas turbine-electric venture while they sought a supplier of more reliable diesel engines suitable for road locomotives. Production of Cooper-Bessemer powered Universal Series locomotives began in 1956 and some 400 export locomotives were sold before the U25B was offered in the United States. The U25B was announced by General Electric as a domestic model on April 26, 1960. It was the first locomotive powered by GE's highly successful FDL-16 engine.

The U-Boat put GE on the road to becoming the top locomotive producer in the U.S., much to the chagrin of EMD. It introduced many innovations to the U.S. diesel locomotive market, including a pressurized car body and a centralized air processing system that provided filtered air to the engine and electrical cabinet, thus reducing maintenance. The U25B was also the highest-horsepower four-axle diesel road locomotive in the U.S. at the time of its introduction, its contemporaries being the GP20 (2,000 hp) and the RS27 (2,400 hp or 1,800 kW).

Though many were produced and sold, the only remaining U25B locomotives are in museums, as many were retired or scrapped at the end of their service life by the end of the 1980s.

== Original owners ==
Image	Railroad	Quantity	Numbers	Notes
	General Electric (XP-24 testbed)	2	751–752	Never sold, retained by GE
	General Electric (demonstrator)	4	753–756	High short hood; to Frisco 804–807
	General Electric (demonstrator)	4	2501–2504	to Union Pacific 633–636
	General Electric (demonstrator)	4	51-54	to Frisco 812, 814, 815, and 813.
	Atchison, Topeka and Santa Fe Railway	16	1600–1615	renumbered 6600–6615
	Chesapeake and Ohio Railway	38	2500–2537	renumbered 8100–8137
	Chicago, Burlington and Quincy Railroad	6	100–105	to Burlington Northern 5424–5429
	Chicago, Milwaukee, St. Paul and Pacific Railroad ("Milwaukee Road")	12	380–391	380 retired 1966; remainder renumbered 5000–5010; renumbered 5050–5060
	Chicago, Rock Island and Pacific Railroad	39	200–238	225–238 to Maine Central Railroad 225–238
	Erie Lackawanna Railroad	27	2501–2527	to Conrail 2570–2596
	Great Northern Railway	24	2500–2523	to Burlington Northern 5400–5423
	Louisville and Nashville Railroad	27	1600–1626	
	New York Central Railroad	70	2500–2569	to Penn Central 2500–2569; to Conrail 2500–2569
	New York, New Haven and Hartford Railroad	26	2500–2525	to Penn Central 2660–2685; to Conrail 2660–2685
	Norfolk and Western Railway	1	3515	3515 was renumbered to 8138 (wreck replacement for Wabash unit)
	Pennsylvania Railroad	59	2500–2548, 2649–2658	renumbered 2600–2658; to Penn Central 2600–2658; to Conrail 2600–2658
	St. Louis – San Francisco Railway ("Frisco")	24	800–803, 808–811, 816-831	804–807, 812-815 ex GE. Numbers 800–807 were high short hood units in black and yellow scheme; The next set (808–815) were low short hood units in black and yellow. The last 16, 816–831, were low hoods and delivered in the orange and white scheme. To Burlington Northern 5210–5233.
	Southern Pacific Company	68	7500–7567	renumbered 6700–6767
	Union Pacific Railroad	12	625–632, 637–640	633–636 ex GE demonstrators 2501–2504. The only railroad, other than the Frisco, to have high short hood U25Bs.
	Wabash Railroad	15	500–514	to Norfolk and Western 3516–3529; renumbered 8139–8152
	Total	478		

== Rebuilds ==
=== M-K TE70-4S ===
Four Southern Pacific U25Bs were rebuilt by Morrison-Knudsen with a Sulzer V-12 prime mover. These locomotives, designated M-K TE70-4S, operated from 1978 to 1987. The experiment proved unsuccessful, and no additional units were rebuilt.

=== U25BE ===
Two Southern Pacific U25Bs were rebuilt by the Southern Pacific Transportation Company themselves at their own Sacramento Shops into GE U25BE locomotives. Only SP #3100 was preserved while SP 3101 was scrapped in 1987.

== Preservation ==
Six U25Bs are known to be preserved today. Of these, only one remains in operating condition. Southern Pacific 3100 is now on permanent exhibit at the Southern California Railway Museum in Perris, California. Built in 1963, this locomotive was first numbered SP 7508. Later numbered SP 6800, it became a goodwill ambassador for the railroad in 1976 when it was painted in an elaborate red, white, and blue color scheme in celebration of the nation's bicentennial; it was later renumbered and repainted in standard SP livery and was donated to the museum. The 3100 is fully certified to run on any of the nation's railroads and is frequently used as motive power for offsite work trains.

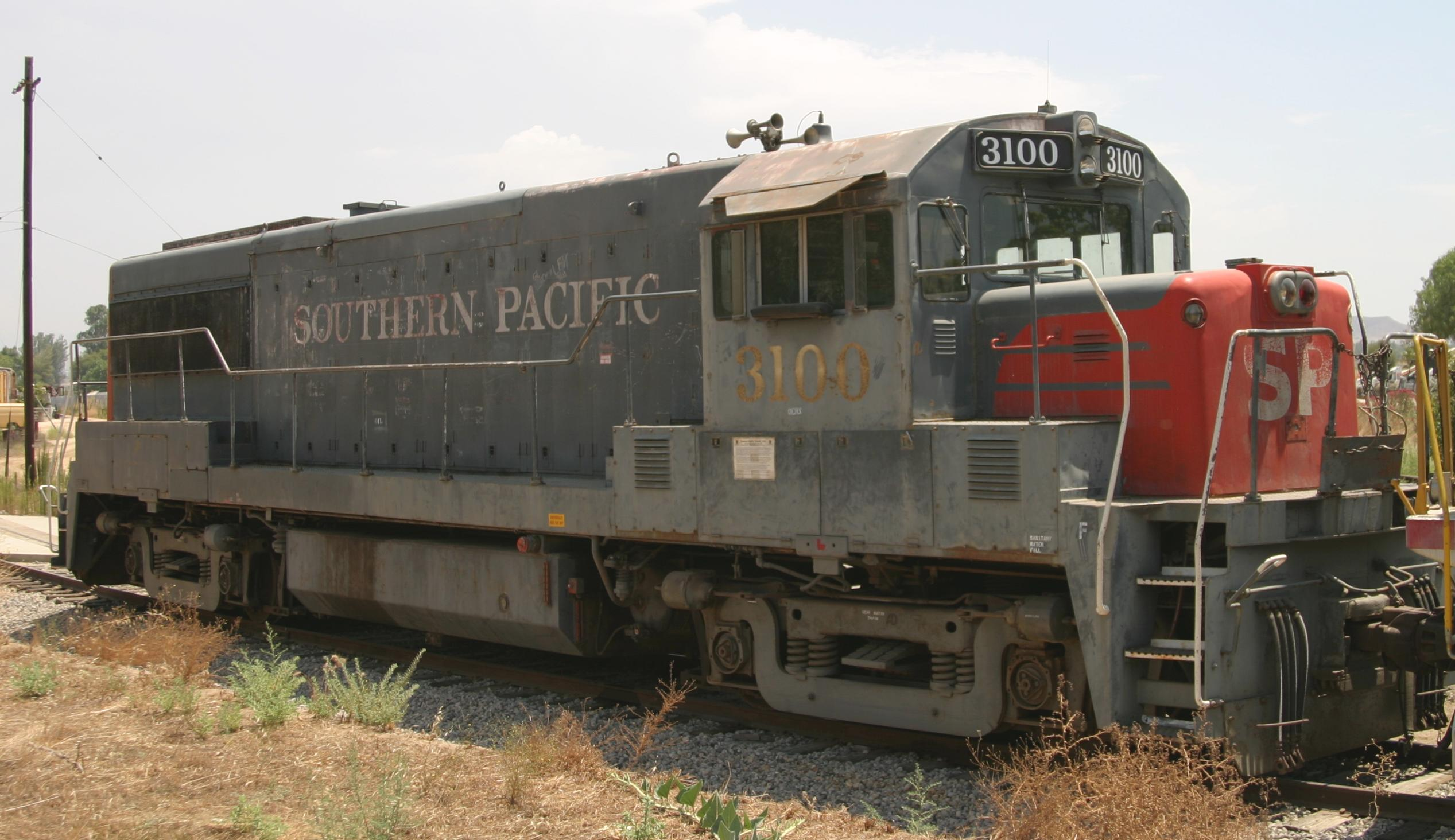
SP 3100, the only GE U25B still in working order, is operated at the Southern California Railway Museum.

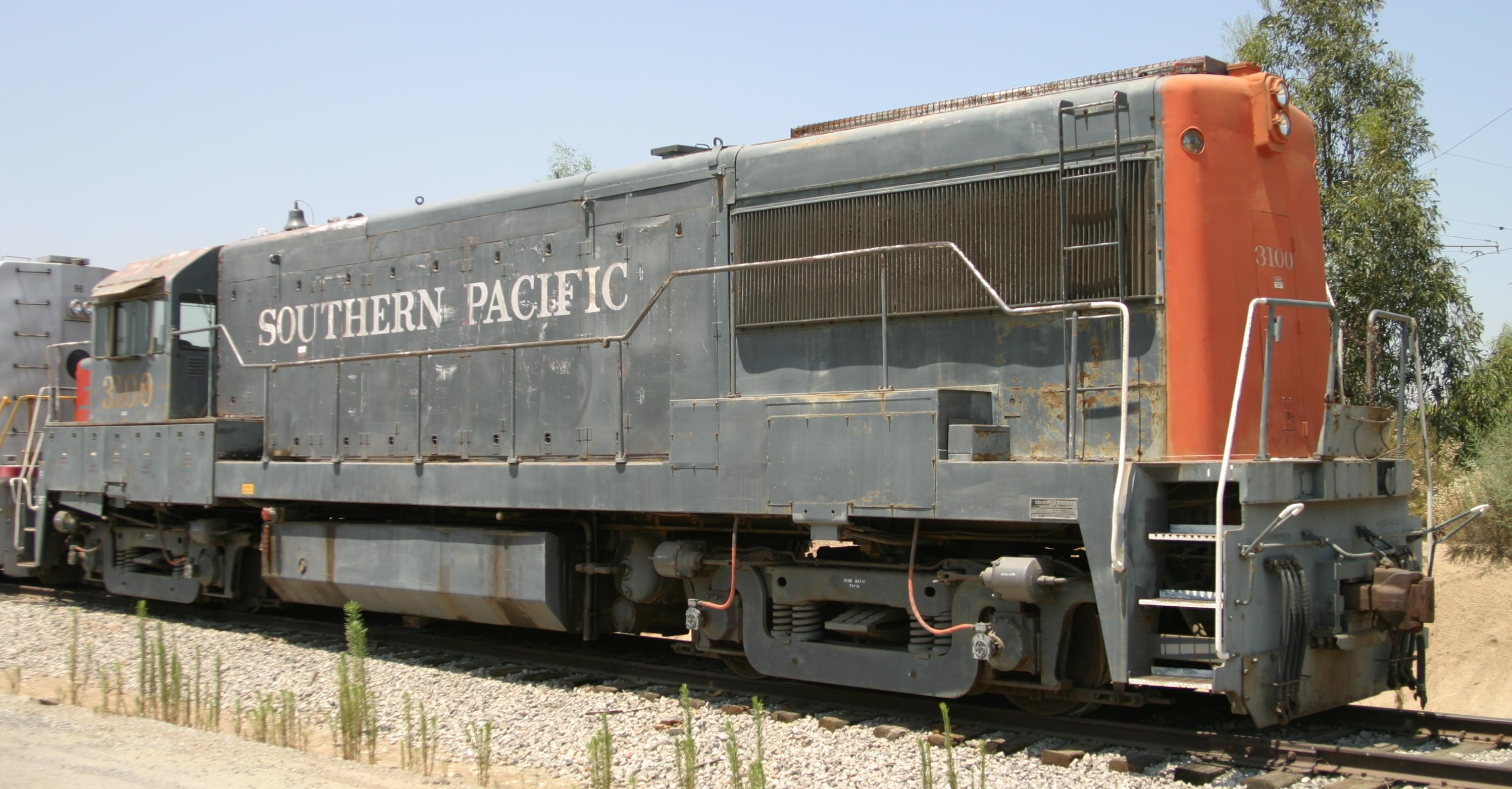
Long hood end of SP 3100.

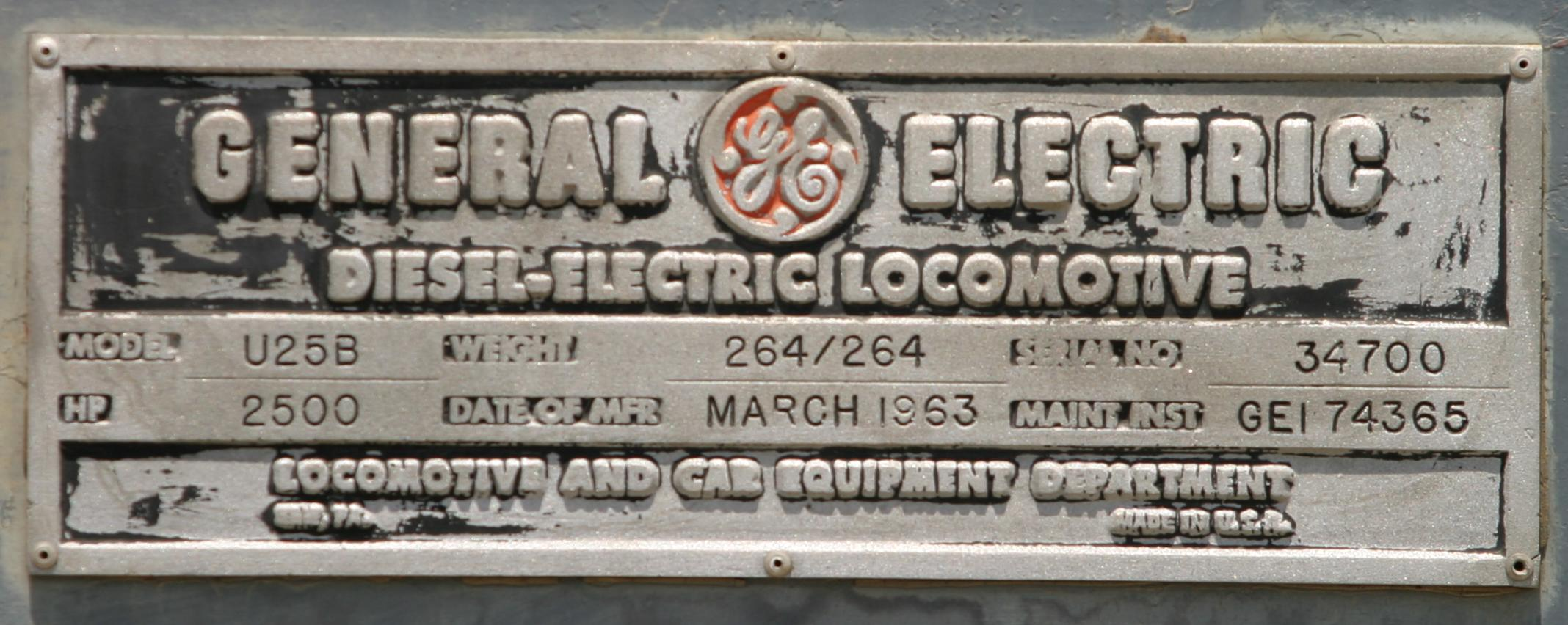
The builder’s plate on SP 3100.

Several more examples survive, all in varying states of preservation:

- Louisville and Nashville 1616 is stored at the Southern Appalachia Railway Museum in Oak Ridge, Tennessee. The unit is missing its main generator.
- Milwaukee Road 5056 is preserved at the Illinois Railway Museum and is being both cosmetically and mechanically restored for operation on the museum grounds.
- Milwaukee Road 5057 is being cosmetically restored by Cascade Rail Foundation to eventually be displayed at the South Cle Elum Rail Yard in Washington.
- New Haven 2525 has been preserved by the Railroad Museum of New England/Naugatuck Railroad of Thomaston, CT. It wears its original New Haven colors, however it is not currently operational.
- New York Central 2500 is on display at the Lake Shore Railway Historical Society museum in North East, Pennsylvania.
