= List of preserved EMD GP20 locomotives =

This is a summary, listing every EMD GP20 locomotive in preservation.

== GP20 (High hood) ==
Photograph	Serial no.	Locomotive	Build date	Former operators	Retire date	Disposition and location	Notes	References
	25623	Western Pacific 2001	November 1959	Western Pacific Railroad (WP)	March 18, 1985	Undergoing restoration to operating condition at the Western Pacific Railroad Museum in Portola, California	The very first EMD GP20 ever built and first GP20 purchased by the Western Pacific.	

== GP20 (Low hood) ==
Photograph	Serial no.	Locomotive	Build date	Former operators	Retire date	Disposition and location	Notes	References
	27350	SPTX 4079	April 1962	Southern Pacific Transportation Company (SP); FarmRail Corporation (FMRC); Grainbelt Corporation (GNBC); Midland Railway (MR)	-	Stored at the Midland Railway Historical Association (MRHA) in Baldwin City, Kansas		

== Rebuilt GP20 (Low hood) ==
Photograph	Serial no.	Locomotive	Build date	Rebuilder	Rebuild date	Model	Former operators	Retire date	Disposition and location	Notes	References
	26868	Sierra Railroad 48	November 1961	AT&SF's San Bernardino shops	October 24, 1978	GP20u	Atchison, Topeka and Santa Fe Railway (AT&SF); Burlington Northern and Santa Fe Railway (BNSF)	November 15, 1999	Operational at the Napa Valley Wine Train in Napa, California	under lease	
	26948	KLIX 2003	January 1962	SP's Sacramento shops	December 11, 1979	GP20R	St. Louis Southwestern Railway (SSW); South Kansas and Oklahoma Railroad (SKOL); Webb Asset Management (WAMX); Klarr Locomotive Industries LLC (KLIX)	October 3, 1996	Stored at the Arkansas Railroad Museum in Pine Bluff, Arkansas		
	27093	Iowa Northern 2000	February 1962	SP's Sacramento shops	June 30, 1975	GP20E	Southern Pacific Transportation Company (SP); Wisconsin and Southern Railroad (W&S); Iowa Northern Railway (IANR)	September 1991	On static display at Manly, Iowa	Named "Arthur C. Sabin" by the IANR	
	27094	Georgia Northeastern 4125	February 1962	SP's Sacramento shops	February 16, 1979	GP20R	Southern Pacific Transportation Company (SP); Georgia Northeastern Railroad (GNRR); Kiski Junction Railroad (KJR)	November 1994	Operational at the Blue Ridge Scenic Railway at Blue Ridge, Georgia		
