= ALCO RS-3m =

Model of rebuilt diesel-electric locomotive

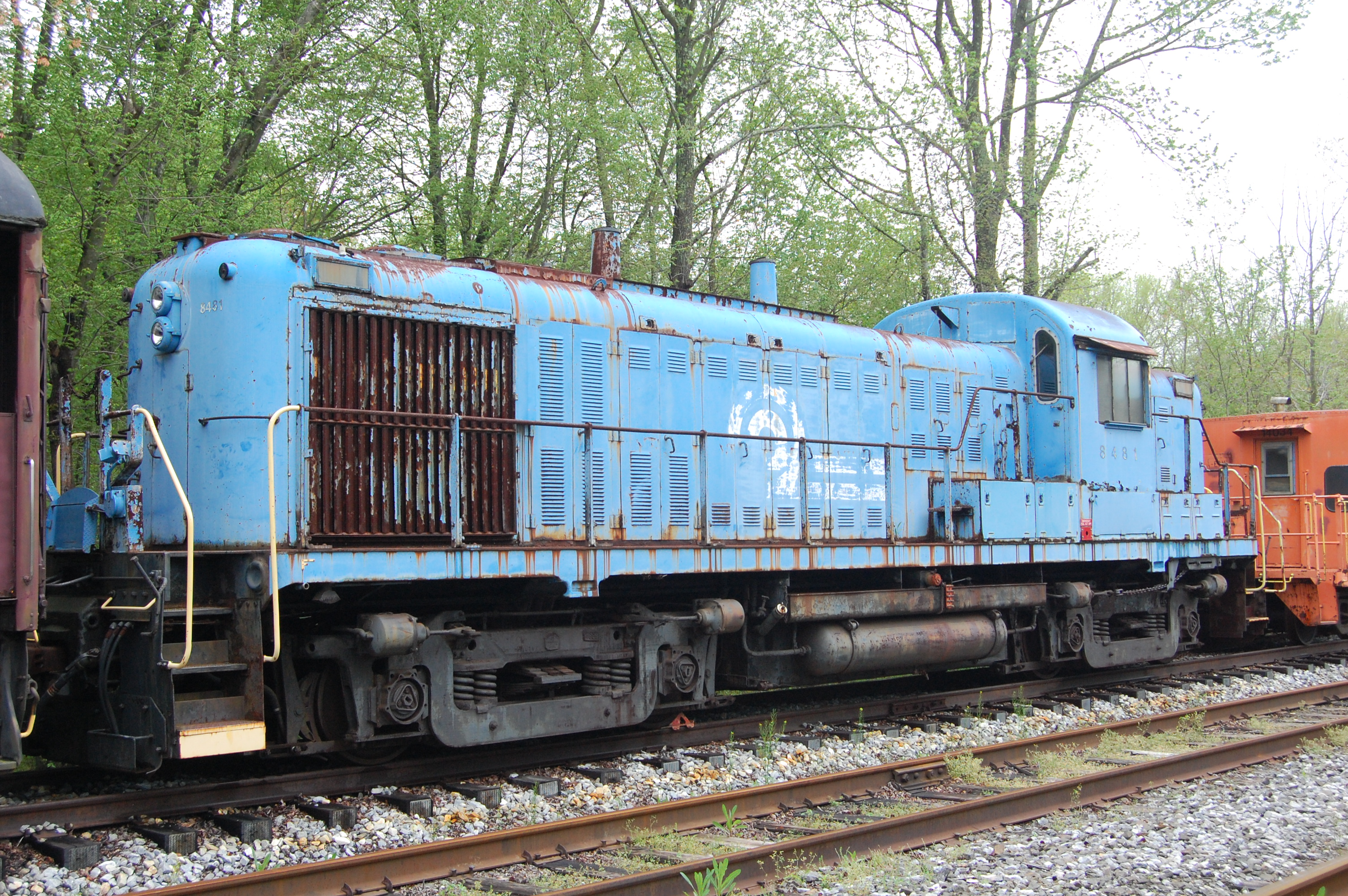
- A former Conrail RS-3m locomotive now owned by the Cape May Seashore Line Railroad. May 6, 2009
Type and origin
- Power type: Diesel-electric
- Build date: 1956 – 1978
Specifications
- Configuration
  - AAR: B-B
- Gauge: 4 ft 8 1/2 in (1,435 mm)
- Prime mover: EMD 567
Career
- Operators: Penn Central, Conrail, Missouri-Kansas-Texas, Chicago and North Western, Green Bay and Western Railroad, Amtrak
- Locale: Eastern and Midwestern United States

The ALCO RS-3m is a diesel-electric locomotive rebuilt from an ALCO RS-3 road switcher. These 98 locomotives were rebuilt to replace their original ALCO prime mover with the more reliable EMD 567B engine and fan assemblies taken from retired E8s. Many of these rebuilds were performed by the ex NYC DeWitt shop with 56 completed at the ex PRR Juniata shop. The RS3m rebuild program started in 1972 and continued until 1978 under Conrail.

Perhaps one of the earliest examples of the RS3m is the former Missouri-Kansas-Texas Railroad's RS3m fleet. Built in the early 1950s by ALCO, the Katy had them rebuilt in the late 1950s by ALCO competitor, EMD, who rebuilt them with GP9 long hoods to make room for the larger EMD 567 prime movers.

The Chicago and North Western Railway had a pair of RS-3ms (1613 & 1624) that were rebuilt by ALCO in March 1960 using an 1,800 hp 12 cylinder ALCO 251-B engine and schedule 26L air brake components. These featured long hoods from ALCO RS-11 road switchers.

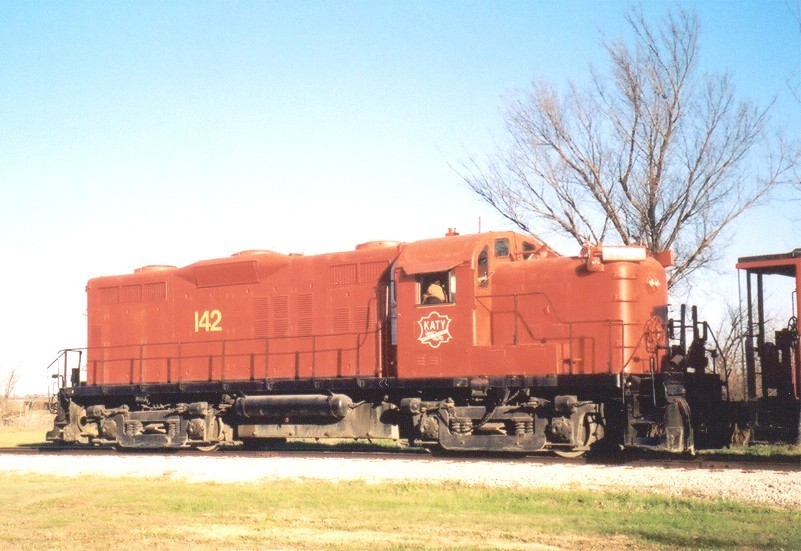
Missouri Kansas Texas locomotive 142

== Missouri Pacific GP12 ==
The Missouri Pacific Railroad had a fleet of RS-2s and RS-3s that were rebuilt in their North Little Rock shops, receiving the GP12 designation after rebuilding with EMD 567 engines. These look like normal Alco RS-3s with the addition of more exhaust stacks.

== New Haven - Alco rebuilds ==
By the year 1958, the New Haven RR needed renewed power but couldn't afford new. They decided to rebuild the RS-3 fleet "in kind" as they were ten years old by that point. For first-generation diesels, ten years was considered middle-aged. Twenty one rebuilds were done by Alco in three groups. All the Alco rebuilds had the black cab/orange hood paint scheme and were able to Multiple Unit aka MU with later engines. Nose MU was added as well. These rebuilds kept the original Alco 244 engines. The New Haven didn't have the problems that other roads did with their 244 engined locos.

The first rebuilds: Type I — kept their steam generator, and single bulb reflector headlights; #526 & #529 kept their buffer plates for diaphragms. #518, 526, 529, 549, & 553 were rebuilt May 1958 - June 1958. Type II — kept the steam generator but got twin sealed beam headlights. #533, 551, & 559 were rebuilt in October 1959. Type III — The steam generator and water tank were removed and got a concrete block instead. Headlights were replaced with a twin sealed beam headlights. They all received a raised area around the stack. Units rebuilt in early 1962 - #517, 520, 523, 527, 528, 534, 535, 537, 538, 545, 548, 557, & 558.

The New Haven RR itself rebuilt two units at their Lamberton Street Shop, numbers #542 & 543. These units kept their steam generators and single-bulb headlights but were not upgraded to nose-mounted Multiple Unit capability. Repainted in the black cab/orange hood paint scheme. The remaining 21 New Haven RS-3's were never rebuilt.

Three of Amtrak's fleet of RS-3's were repowered at New Haven. Amtrak 104, 106, 107.

== Penn Central "End-Cab" rebuild ==
There were RS-3ms working for the Penn Central Transportation Company. These locomotives were called the "DeWitt Geeps". One of the locomotives, PC #9950, was rebuilt with the short hood removed and left with what is known by railfans as an end-cab. A cab type similar to that of the S1, HH Series, or the EMD SW/SC/NW series of locomotives. This was the only end-cab RS-3m built.

== Green Bay and Western RS-20 ==
In 1975, the Green Bay and Western Railroad started rebuilding their four RS-3 units numbers 306, 307, 308 & 309. They lowered the nose and raised the long hood for the Alco 251e 2,000 hp engines. These rebuilds are called RS-20s.

== RS3u ==
The Delaware and Hudson Railway had eight RS3u locomotives that were rebuilt by Morrison-Knudsen between December 1975 and March 1976. They received ALCO 12-251C prime movers, boosting horsepower from 1,600 to 2,000 hp (1,200 to 1,500 kW). M-K raised the long hood six inches (152 mm), moved the dynamic brake to behind the cab and cut-down the short hood.

== RS-3m units today ==
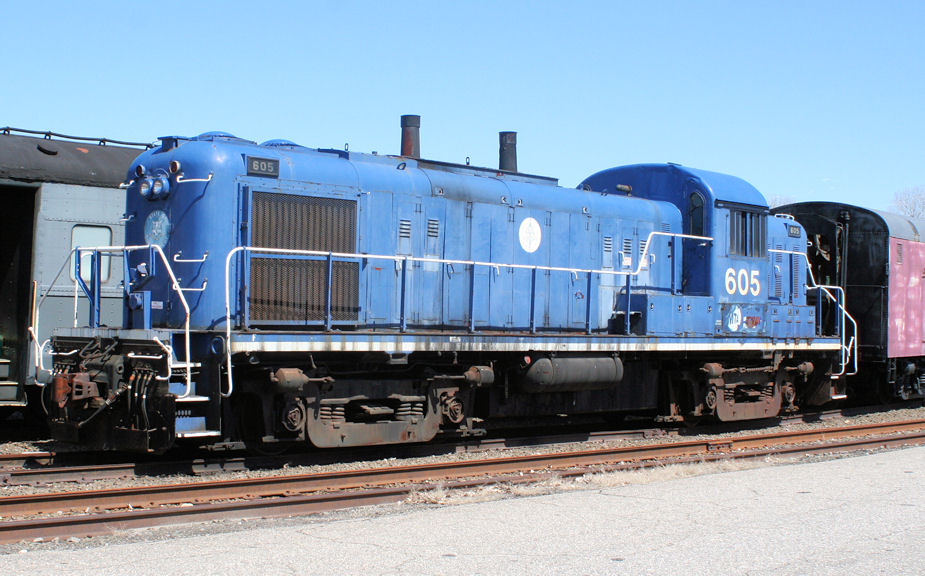
Metro-North Alco RS-3m #605 at Danbury Railway Museum. April 9, 2006

As of 2021, rebuilt RS-3s can be found in museums, on shortlines and as industrial switchers.

- Cape May Seashore Line Railroad — A former Conrail RS-3m locomotive, formerly Pennsylvania Railroad 8481.
- Danbury Museum — #605 occasionally is used to run an in yard passenger train.
- Housatonic Railroad — (HRRC), based in Canaan, Connecticut purchased an RS-3m, number 9935, from Conrail in 1986. As of 2018 out of service.
- Maryland and Delaware Railroad — owns three former Conrail units, numbered 1201 an ex Delaware Lackawanna #911, ex Erie-Lackawanna #1049, ex Conrail # 5265/9999. 1202 an ex Conrail RS-3m #9926, ex Erie Lackawanna RS-3 #1040, and 1203 an ex Erie-Lackawanna #1052 RS-3, ex Conrail #9942 RS-3M.
- Michigan Southern Railroad aka Pioneer Railcorp — had an RS3m stored OOS on their property. Scrapped December 2011.
- Ottawa Northern Railroad, formerly Midland Railway — MKT #142 in Baldwin City, Kansas.
- Rochester & Genesee Valley Railroad Museum — has an operating RS3M nicknamed 'Hammerhead' referring to its hammerlike, high short hood, low long hood shape. painted as Lehigh Valley 211.
- Arcade and Attica Railroad — Former D&H #506, Western New York & Pennsylvania Railroad #406, purchased by Arcade and Attica in 2023
