= Prairie City, Kansas =

- Ghost town
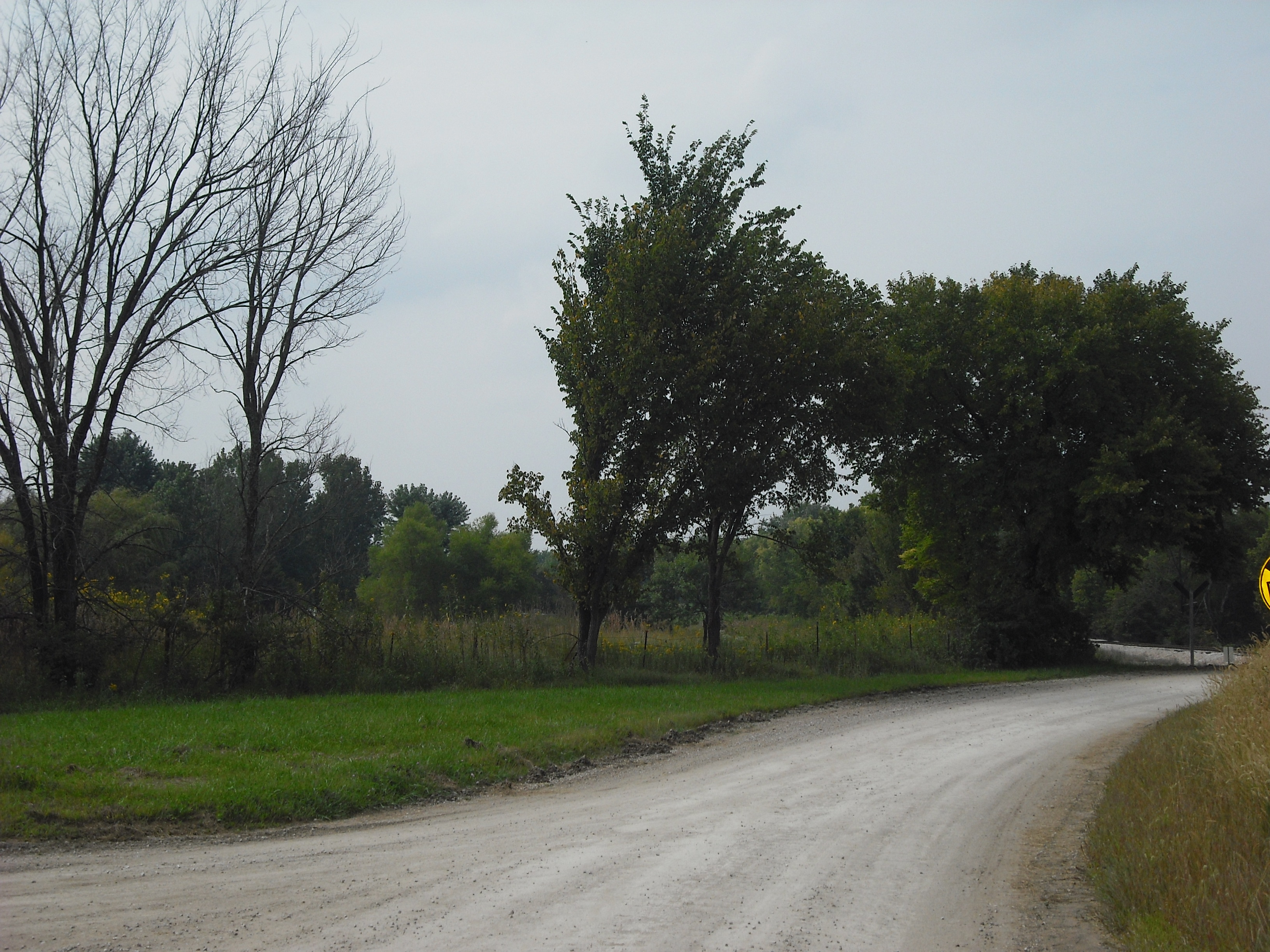
- Prairie City location near the Midland Railway

- Location within Kansas
- Coordinates: 38°45′37″N 95°12′48″W
- Country: United States
- State: Kansas
- County: Douglas
- Elevation: 1,037 ft (316 m)

Population
  - Total: 0
- Time zone: UTC-6 (CST)
  - Summer (DST): UTC-5 (CDT)
- Area code: 785
- GNIS ID: 482179

Prairie City is a ghost town in southeast Douglas County, Kansas, United States, near present-day Baldwin City.

== History ==
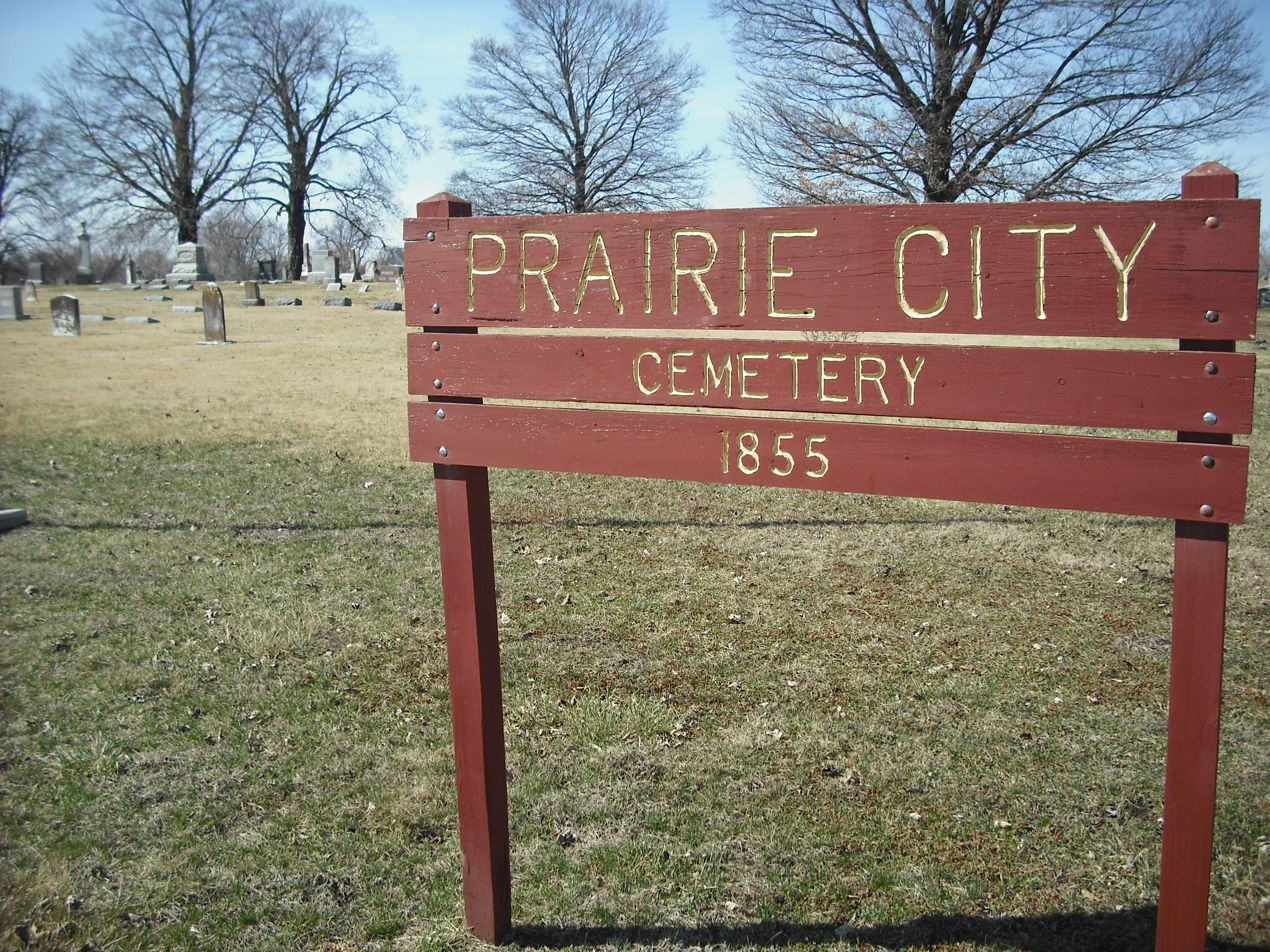
Prairie City Cemetery

Prairie City was founded in 1855 by James Lane, William Graham, Louis (Lewis) Green, and Salmon Prouty after a dispute between Graham and Henry Barricklow of nearby Palmyra. A post office opened in 1856, with John Winton serving as postmaster. The Heber Institute was started by the Protestant Episcopal Church in 1856 but never opened. The building became Prairie City School District No. 1.

The first printing press in Kansas was used in Prairie City by Prouty to publish The Freeman's Champion, which ran for 40 weeks. Prouty bought the press in 1857 from the Ottawa Baptist Mission in Franklin County. Prouty would leave Prairie City in 1868 and move to Topeka, where he would found the Topeka Journal which would later merge to become the Topeka Capital-Journal

Prairie City was incorporated on February 4, 1859 and at one time had three general stores and three hotels. Prairie City was the rendezvous point for John Brown and his men the night before initiating the Battle of Black Jack. When the Leavenworth, Lawrence and Fort Gibson railroad laid tracks through the area, there was a depot at Baldwin and another, two miles southwest at Prairie City. Thinking that was impractical, a new depot was built between the two towns and was named "Media". The Prairie City post office, opened in 1856, was moved to Media in 1878, and was finally closed in 1903. The Media library was used as a tool shed in the Prairie City Cemetery for years until being razed in 2012.

On March 24, 1883, Douglas County commissioners had certain streets and alleys vacated. Today, little remains to mark the city except a few houses, a cemetery and the ruins of an old Catholic church. The Ottawa Northern Railroad from Baldwin passes by a sign pointing out where the depot, newspaper, post office and store were once located.
