= List of preserved EMD F-series locomotives =

This is a summary, listing every locomotive from the EMD F-series that are in preservation.

== FT ==
Photograph	Works no.	Locomotive	Build date	Model	Former operators	Retire date	Disposition and location	Notes	References
	1030A	EMDX 103	March 1939	FTA	Electro-Motive Diesel (EMDX)	-	On static display at the National Museum of Transportation in St. Louis, Missouri		
		Southern 960601	October 1943	FTB	Southern Railway (SR)	-	On static display at the National Museum of Transportation in St. Louis, Missouri		
	1824	Southern 960603	October 1943	FTB	Southern Railway (SR)	-	Stored at the National Museum of Transportation in St. Louis, Missouri		
	2674	Southern 960604	December 1944	FTB	Southern Railway (SR); Southeastern Railway Museum (SRM)	-	Stored at the North Carolina Transportation Museum in Spencer, North Carolina		
	2843	Ferrocarril Sonora–Baja California 2203	January 1945	FTA	Northern Pacific Railway (NP); Ferrocarril Sonora–Baja California (SBC)	-	On static display at the National Railway Museum in Puebla, Puebla		

== F3 ==
Photograph	Works no.	Locomotive	Build date	Model	Former operators	Retire date	Disposition and location	Notes	References
	3586	Seaboard Air Line 4033	December 1946	FP10	Gulf, Mobile and Ohio Railroad (GM&O); Massachusetts Bay Transit Authority (MBTA); Cape Cod and Hyannis Railroad (CCH)	-	Out of service; on static display at the Gold Coast Railroad Museum in Miami, Florida		
	3600	Metro North Commuter 413	December 1946	FP10	Gulf, Mobile and Ohio Railroad (GM&O); Massachusetts Bay Transit Authority (MBTA); Metro North Commuter Railroad (MNCR)	-	Stored at the Danbury Railway Museum in Danbury, Connecticut		
	5174	Delaware Lackawanna and Western 663 and 664	May 1948	F3A	Bangor and Aroostook Railroad (BAR); Rail Tours (RTI); Anthracite Railroads Historical Society (ARHS)	1984	Operational at Steamtown National Historic Site in Scranton, Pennsylvania	ex BAR 44 and 46	
	5180	Delaware Lackawanna and Western 663 and 664	May 1948	F3A	Bangor and Aroostook Railroad (BAR); Rail Tours (RTI); Anthracite Railroads Historical Society (ARHS)		Operational at Steamtown National Historic Site in Scranton, Pennsylvania	ex BAR 44 and 46	
	5888	Canadian National 9000	May 1948	F3A	Canadian National Railway (CN)	October 1971	Operational at the Alberta Railway Museum in Edmonton, Alberta		
	8479	Clinchfield 800	December 1948	F3A	Clinchfield (CCO/CRR); Seaboard System (SBD); CSX Transportation (CSXT); Potomac Eagle Scenic Railroad (PESX)		Operational at the Southern Appalachia Railway Museum in Tennessee	Formerly painted and numbered as C&O 8016 and has since been repainted in Clinchfield colors and given its original number.	

== F7 ==
Photograph	Works no.	Locomotive	Build date	Model	Former operators	Retire date	Disposition and location	Notes	References
	5798	Nashville, Chattanooga and St. Louis 814	April 1949	F7A	Nashville, Chattanooga and St. Louis Railway (NCStL); Louisville and Nashville Railroad (L&N); Clinchfield Railroad (CRR)	-	Stored at the Tennessee Valley Railroad Museum in Chattanooga, Tennessee	Privately owned	
	8306	Santa Fe 347C	1949	F7A	Santa Fe (ATSF)	-	Display at the California State Railroad Museum in Sacramento, California.	Sole surviving Santa Fe F7 not converted into a CF7.	
	8476	Boston and Maine 4266	March 1949	F7A	Boston and Maine Railroad (B&M)	-	Operational at the Conway Scenic Railroad in North Conway, New Hampshire		
	8478	Boston and Maine 4265	March 1949	F7A	Boston and Maine Railroad (B&M)	1981	Display at the Gorham Railroad Museum in Gorham, New Hampshire		
	8551	Chicago and North Western 4073C	August 1949	F7A	Chicago and North Western Railway (C&NW); New Jersey Transit (NJT); United Railroad Historical Society of New Jersey (URHS)	-	Under restoration at the Tennessee Valley Railroad Museum in Chattanooga, Tennessee		
	8552	Reading 284	August 1949	F7A	Chicago and North Western Railway (C&NW); New Jersey Transit (NJT)	1985	Operational at the United Railroad Historical Society of New Jersey in Boonton, New Jersey	Originally Chicago and North Western 4074A	
	8569	Chicago and North Western 411	October 1949	F7A	Chicago and North Western Railway (C&NW); Metra (METX)	-	Operational at the Illinois Railway Museum in Union, Illinois		
	8571	Metra 308	October 1949	F7A	Chicago and North Western Railway (C&NW); Metra (METX)	-	Operational at the Illinois Railway Museum in Union, Illinois		
	8576	BUGX 402	December 1949	F7A	Chicago and North Western Railway (C&NW); Metra (METX); St. Louis and Chain of Rocks Railroad (SLCR); Gettysburg Railroad (GETY); Pioneer Rail Equipment (PREX)	December 31, 1977 (C&NW); May 2, 1993 (MTEX)	Stored on the Ottawa Northern Railroad (ONR) in Baldwin City, Kansas		
	8971	Western Pacific 917-D	January 1950	F7A	Western Pacific Railroad (WP)	-	Stored at the Western Pacific Railroad Museum in Portola, California		
	8973	Western Pacific 918-D	January 1950	F7A	Western Pacific Railroad (WP)	March 1981	Operational at the Niles Canyon Railway in Sunol, California		
	8976	Western Pacific 913	January 1950	F7A	Western Pacific Railroad (WP)	-	Operational at the California State Railroad Museum in Sacramento, California		
	9932	Boston and Maine 4268	October 1949	F7A	Boston and Maine Railroad (B&M)	-	Operational at the Conway Scenic Railroad in North Conway, New Hampshire		
	10151	Chicago and North Western 4087C	December 1949	F7A	Chicago and North Western Railway (CNW); New Jersey Transit (NJT); United Railroad Historical Society of New Jersey (URHS)	-	Stored, awaiting restoration at the Tennessee Valley Railroad Museum in Chattanooga, Tennessee		
	10805	Mount Newman 5451	June 1951	F7A	Western Pacific (WP); Mount Newman Railway	-	Static display at the Don Rhodes Mining & Transport Museum, Port Hedland, Australia		
	11066	Great Northern 274	1951	F7A	Great Northern Railway (GN); Burlington Northern Railroad (BN); Seattle and North Coast Railroad (SNCT)	-	Operational at the Oregon Coast Scenic Railroad in Garibaldi, Oregon		
	12322	Kansas City Southern 37D	August 1950	F7A	Kansas City Southern (KCS)	-	Static Display at the Former Station in Decatur, Arkansas	Converted into a slug unit. Added to NRHP in 2006.	
	12655	MARC 7100	February 1951	F7 APCU	Baltimore and Ohio Railroad (B&O); MARC Train (MARC)	-	Operational at the National Museum of Railroad History & Innovation in Baltimore, Maryland		
	15158	NdeM 6328-B	November 1951	F7B	Ferrocarriles Nacionales de México (NdeM)	-	On static display at the National Railway Museum in Puebla, Puebla		
	15220	Milwaukee Road 118C	November 1951	F7A	Milwaukee Road (MILW)	-	Operational at the Illinois Railway Museum in Union, Illinois		
	16559	Southern Pacific 6378	July 1952	F7A	Southern Pacific Railroad (SP); Louisiana and Northwestern Railroad (L&NW)	June 11, 1968	Stored, Awaiting restoration at the Golden Gate Railroad Museum in Schellville, California		
	16561	Southern Pacific 6380	July 1952	F7A	Southern Pacific Railroad (SP); Louisiana and Northwestern Railroad (L&NW)	June 10, 1968	Stored, Awaiting restoration at the Golden Gate Railroad in Schellville, California		
	16583	Southern Pacific 6402	August 1952	F7A	Southern Pacific Railroad (SP)	December 18, 1969	Stored at the California State Railroad Museum in Sacramento, California		
	16587	Bessemer and Lake Erie 715A	June 1952	F7A	Bessemer and Lake Erie Railroad (B&LE); Pittsburgh and Conneaut Dock Co.	-	Stored, Awaiting restoration at the Tennessee Central Railway Museum in Nashville, Tennessee	Will operate as L&N 815	
	16591	Bessemer and Lake Erie 719A	June 1952	F7A	Bessemer and Lake Erie Railroad (B&LE); Pittsburgh and Conneaut Dock Co.	-	Under restoration at the Tennessee Central Railway Museum in Nashville, Tennessee	Will operate as L&N 819	
	16594	Bessemer and Lake Erie 722A	June 1952	F7A	Bessemer and Lake Erie Railroad (B&LE)	-	Operational at the Potomac Eagle Scenic Railroad in Romney, West Virginia	Painted in Baltimore and Ohio colors.	
	16598	Bessemer and Lake Erie 715B	June 1952	F7B	Bessemer and Lake Erie Railroad (B&LE)	-	Operational at the Tennessee Central Railway Museum in Nashville, Tennessee	Operates as L&N 715	
	16602	Bessemer and Lake Erie 719B	June 1952	F7B	Bessemer and Lake Erie Railroad (B&LE)	-	Operational at the Tennessee Central Railway Museum in Nashville, Tennessee	Operates as L&N 719	
	17710	Alaska Railroad 1500	December 1952	F7A	Alaska Railroad (ARR)	1986	On static display at the Museum of Alaska Transportation and Industry in Wasilla, Alaska		
	17910	BUGX 401	February 1953	F7A	Bessemer and Lake Erie Railroad (B&LE); U.S. Steel (USSX); Texas Southern Railway (TXSO); Fort Worth and Western Railroad (FWWR); Gettysburg Railroad (GETY); Pioneer Rail Equipment (PREX)	-	Stored on the Ottawa Northern Railroad (ONR) in Baldwin City, Kansas		
	17916	RPCX 804	January 1953	F7A	Spokane, Portland and Seattle Railway (SP&S); Burlington Northern Railroad (BN); Cadillac and Lake City Railway (CLK); Colorado and Eastern Railway (COE); Minnesota Zephyr (MNZX); San Luis and Rio Grande Railroad (SLRG); Railroad Passenger Car Numbering Bureau (RPCX)	May 1971	Under ownership of the Inland Northwest Rail Museum (INRM) in Reardan, Washington		
	18157	Southern Pacific 6443	February 1953	F7A	Southern Pacific Railroad (SP); Wellsville, Addison and Galeton Railroad (WA&GR); Port Authority of Allegheny County (PAT); Connecticut Department of Transportation (CDOT)	July 24, 1969	On static display, serviceable at the Galveston Railroad Museum in Galveston, Texas	As AT&SF 315	
	A139	Wabash 671	March 1951	F7A	Wabash Railroad (WAB); Norfolk and Western Railway (N&W)	-	Display at the Mad River & NKP Railroad Museum in Bellevue, Ohio	Built by GMD	
	A386	Santa Fe 49	March 1951	F7A	Canadian National Railway (CN)	-	Operational at the Museum of the American Railroad in Frisco, Texas	Originally Canadian National 9167.	
	A487	Wabash 1189	April 1953	F7A	Wabash Railroad (WAB); Norfolk and Western Railway (N&W)	1979	Operational at the Monticello Railway Museum in Monticello, Illinois	Last F7A built for the Wabash. Built by GMD in London, Ontario.	

== FP7 ==
Photograph	Works no.	Locomotive	Build date	Model	Builder	Former operators	Retire date	Disposition and location	Notes	References
	9004	Western Pacific 805-A	January 1950	FP7A	EMD	Western Pacific Railroad (WP)	1972	Operational at the Western Pacific Railroad Museum in Portola, California		
	11012	Soo Line 2500	1949	FP7A	EMD	Soo Line (SOO)	1986	Operational at the Lake Superior Railroad Museum in Duluth, Minnesota	Built as demonstrator unit no. 7001.	
	11015	Soo Line 500	November 1949	FP7A	EMD	Soo Line (SOO)	1985	Static Display in Ladysmith, Wisconsin		
	11387	Reading 900	May 1950	FP7A	EMD	Reading Company (RDG); SEPTA Regional Rail (SPAX)	-	Display at the Reading Railroad Heritage Museum in Hamburg, Pennsylvania		
	11389	Reading 902 and 903	May 1950	FP7A	EMD	Reading Company (RDG); SEPTA Regional Rail (SPAX)	-	Operational at the Woodstown Central Railroad in Woodstown, New Jersey	Owned by the Reading Company Technical and Historical Society.	
	11390	Reading 902 and 903	May 1950	FP7A	EMD	Reading Company (RDG); SEPTA Regional Rail (SPAX)	-	Operational at the Woodstown Central Railroad in Woodstown, New Jersey	Owned by SMS Rail.	
	11510	Southern 6133	April 1950	FP7A	EMD	Cincinnati, New Orleans and Texas Pacific (CNOTP); Southern Railway (SOU)	-	Operational at the North Carolina Transportation Museum in Spencer, North Carolina		
	11515	Southern 6138	May 1950	FP7A	EMD	Cincinnati, New Orleans and Texas Pacific (CNOTP); Southern Railway (SOU)	-	Operational on the My Old Kentucky Dinner Train in Bardstown, Kentucky	Owned by R.J. Corman, numbered 1941.	
	12337	Southern 6141	October 1950	FP7A	EMD	Cincinnati, New Orleans and Texas Pacific (CNOTP); Southern Railway (SOU)	-	Operational on the My Old Kentucky Dinner Train in Bardstown, Kentucky	Owned by R.J. Corman, numbered 1940.	
	12339	Stone Mountain Scenic 6143	November 1950	FP7A	EMD	Cincinnati, New Orleans and Texas Pacific (CNOTP); Southern Railway (SOU); New Georgia Railroad (NGRR)	-	Operational at the Stone Mountain Scenic Railroad in Stone Mountain, Georgia		
	12343	Stone Mountain Scenic 6147	November 1950	FP7A	EMD	Cincinnati, New Orleans and Texas Pacific (CNOTP); Southern Railway (SOU); New Georgia Railroad (NGRR)	-	Operational at the Stone Mountain Scenic Railroad in Stone Mountain, Georgia		
	13559	Chicago Great Western 116-A	December 1950	FP7A	EMD	Chicago Great Western Railway (CGW); Chicago and North Western Railway (CNW)	1993	Display in Oelwein, Iowa		
	16945	Milwaukee Road 104C	December 1950	FP7A	EMD	Milwaukee Road (MILW)	May 1980	Stored at the Illinois Railway Museum in Union, Illinois		
	19064	Alaska Railroad 1510	December 1953	FP7A	EMD	Alaska Railroad (ARR); Wyoming and Colorado Railroad (WYCO); Arizona Central Railroad (AZCR)	-	Operational at the Verde Canyon Railroad in Clarkdale, Arizona		
	19065	Alaska Railroad 1512	December 1953	FP7A	EMD	Alaska Railroad (ARR); Wyoming and Colorado Railroad (WYCO); Arizona Central Railroad (AZCR)	-	Operational at the Verde Canyon Railroad in Clarkdale, Arizona		
	A242	Canadian Pacific 4038	September 1951	FP7A	GMD	Canadian Pacific Railway (CP)	December 1982	On static display in Minnedosa, Manitoba	CP Class DFA-15d	
	A244	"Pennsylvania Railroad 9880"	September 1951	FP7A	GMD	Canadian Pacific Railway (CP); Société de Transport de la Communauté Urbaine de Montréal (STCUM); Agence métropolitaine de transport (AMTL); Michigan Air Line Railway (MALR); Silcott Railway Equipment (GSLX); Tioga Central Railroad (TCRR)	-	Operational on the Stourbridge Line (DLS) at Honesdale, Pennsylvania	Never operated on the PRR, CP Class DFA-15d	
	A370	Canadian Pacific 4069	August 1952	FP7A	GMD	Canadian Pacific Railway (CP); Via Rail (VIA)	-	Operational at the West Coast Railway Association (WCRA) in Squamish, British Columbia	CP Class DFA-15c.	
	A371	Quebec Central 1300	October 1952	FP7A	GMD	Canadian Pacific Railway (CP); Société de Transport de la Communauté Urbaine de Montréal (STCUM); Agence métropolitaine de transport (AMTL); Quebec Central Railway (QCR)	-	Stored at Sacré-Coeur-de-Jésus, Quebec. Coordinates (46°14'29.6"N 71°02'17.8"W)		
Algoma Central Railway No. 1404 - September 2018 - 01	A524	Algoma Central Railway 1404	June 1953	FP7A	GMD	Canadian Pacific Railway (CP); Via Rail (VIA); Algoma Central Railway (AC)	-	Not operational since 2004. On static display at the West Coast Railway Association (WCRA) in Squamish, British Columbia	CP Class DFA-15a.	

== F9 ==
Photograph	Works no.	Locomotive	Build date	Builder	Model	Former operators	Retire date	Disposition and location	Notes	References
	12668	Branson Scenic 98	January 1951	EMD	F9PHA	Baltimore and Ohio Railroad (B&O); Marc Train (MARC)	-	Operational at the Branson Scenic Railway in Branson, Missouri		
	15909	Reading Blue Mountain and Northern 270	January 1952	EMD	F9PHA	Baltimore and Ohio Railroad (B&O); Marc Train (MARC); St. Louis Car Company (SLCC); Railroad Passenger Car Numbering Bureau (RCPX); Norfolk Southern Railway (NS)	-	Operational on the Reading Blue Mountain and Northern Railroad in Port Clinton, Pennsylvania		
	16642	Aberdeen, Carolina and Western 721	August 1952	EMD	F9PHA	Baltimore and Ohio Railroad (B&O); Marc Train (MARC); St. Louis Car Company (SLCC); Railroad Passenger Car Numbering Bureau (RCPX); Norfolk Southern Railway (NS)	-	Operational on the Aberdeen, Carolina and Western Railway in Aberdeen, North Carolina		
	19056	Burlington Northern 1	January 1954	EMD	F9A	Northern Pacific (NP); Burlington Northern (BN)	-	Operational at the Illinois Railway Museum in Union, Illinois		
	19741	Northern Pacific 7003-D	September 1954	EMD	F9A	Northern Pacific (NP); Burlington Northern (BN)	-	Operable at the Oklahoma Railway Museum in Oklahoma City, Oklahoma	Currently painted as Frisco 814	
	20527	Denver and Rio Grande Western 5771	September 1955	EMD	F9A	Denver and Rio Grande Western (DRGW)	-	Static Display at the Colorado Railroad Museum in Golden, Colorado		
	20831	Erie Mining 4211	May 1956	EMD	F9A	Erie Mining (EMCO)	2001	Operational at the Lake Superior Railroad Museum in Duluth, Minnesota		
	21108	Northern Pacific 7012A	March 1956	EMD	F9A	Northern Pacific Railway (NP); Burlington Northern Railroad (BN)	-	Operational at the Mount Rainier Scenic Railroad in Elbe, Washington		
	A214	Western Pacific 925-C	1951	GMD	F9Bu	Canadian National Railway (CN)	Late 1980's	Displayed out of service at the Western Pacific Railroad Museum in Portola, California	Originally Canadian National 9039, never operated for the Western Pacific.	

== FP9 ==
Photograph	Works no.	Locomotive	Build date	Builder	Model	Former operators	Retire date	Disposition and location	Notes	References
	22651	NdeM 7020	October 1956	EMD	FP9A	Ferrocarriles Nacionales de México (NdeM)	-	On static display at the National Railway Museum in Puebla, Puebla.		
Lv_DNS_July_2_2005xRP_-_Flickr_-_drewj1946	A639	"Southern Pacific 6304" / RPCX 6304	September 1954	GMD	FP9A	Canadian National Railway (CN); Via Rail (VIA); AAPRCO Register Private Cars (PPCX); Mid America Rail Car Leasing (MRCX); Washington and Idaho Railway (WIR); Railroad Passenger Car Numbering Bureau (RPCX)	-	Operational at Eastend Scenic Rail Tours in Eastend, Saskatchewan.		
	A1044	Canadian National 6514	January 1957	GMD	FP9A	Canadian National Railway (CN); Via Rail (VIA); Alberta Pioneer Railroad Association (APRA); Algoma Central Railway (AC)	-	Operational at the Alberta Railway Museum in Edmonton, Alberta.		
	A1050	Canadian National 6520	March 1957	GMD	FP9A	Canadian National Railway (CN); Via Rail (VIA); Waterloo–St. Jacobs Railway (WSJR)	-	Operational at the West Coast Railway Association in Squamish, British Columbia.		
	A1051	Texas State Railroad 125	March 1957	GMD	FP9ARM	Canadian National Railway (CN); Via Rail (VIA); Georgia Southwestern Railroad (GSWR)	-	Operational at the Texas State Railroad in Palestine, Texas.		
	A1196	Via Rail 6300	April 1957	GMD	FP9ARM	Canadian National Railway (CN); Via Rail (VIA)	-	Operational at the Heber Valley Railroad in Heber City, Utah.	Sole survivor of the Hilton train collision in 1986.	
	A1200	Via Rail 6309	May 1957	GMD	FP9ARM	Canadian National Railway (CN); Via Rail (VIA)	-	On display at the Canadian Railway Museum in Saint-Constant, Quebec.		
WCRA_special_train_at_Pemberton_BC	A1201	RPCX 6311	May 1957	GMD	FP9ARM	Canadian National Railway (CN); Via Rail (VIA); Mid America Rail Car Leasing (MRLX); Washington and Idaho Railway (WIR); Railroad Passenger Car Numbering Bureau (RPCX)	-	Operational at Eastend Scenic Rail Tours in Eastend, Saskatchewan.		
	A1203	Potomac Eagle Scenic 1755	May 1957	GMD	FP9A	Canadian National Railway (CN); Via Rail (VIA); Algoma Central Railway (AC); Pioneer Rail Corporation (PREX)	-	Operational at the Potomac Eagle Scenic Railroad in Romney, West Virginia.		
	A1393	Texas State Railroad 126	May 1958	GMD	FP9ARM	Canadian National Railway (CN); Via Rail (VIA); Georgia Southwestern Railroad (GSWR)	-	Operational at the Texas State Railroad in Palestine, Texas.		
	A1400	Boone and Scenic Valley 6540	August 1958	GMD	FP9A	Canadian National Railway (CN); Via Rail (VIA)	-	Operational at the Boone and Scenic Valley Railroad in Boone, Iowa.		

== FL9 ==
Photograph	Works no.	Locomotive	Build date	Former operators	Retire date	Disposition and location	Notes	References
	21962	New Haven 2016	October 1957	New Haven (NH); Penn Central (PC); Amtrak (AMTK); Morristown and Erie Railway (ME); Maine Eastern Railroad (MERR)	-	Operational, Owned by Webb Rail.		
	21967	New Haven 2021	October 1957	New Haven (NH); Penn Central (PC); Amtrak (AMTK); Morristown and Erie Railway (ME); Maine Eastern Railroad (MERR)	-	Operational, Owned by Webb Rail.		
	21972	New Haven 2026	November 1957	New Haven (NH); Penn Central (PC); Conrail (CR); Metro-North (MNCR)	-	On static display at the Danbury Railway Museum in Danbury, Connecticut.	Currently numbered 2006	
	21986	New Haven 2040	October 1960	New Haven (NH); Penn Central (PC); Conrail (CR); Metro-North (MNCR)	-	On static display at the Danbury Railway Museum in Danbury, Connecticut.	Repainted by Metro-North into New York Central colors despite never operating for the railroad. Currently numbered 2013	
	21987	New Haven 2041	October 1960	New Haven (NH); Penn Central (PC); Conrail (CR); Metro-North (MNCR)	-	Operational at the Grapevine Vintage Railroad in Grapevine, Texas.	Currently Grapevine Vintage 2014	
	21990	New Haven 2044	October 1960	New Haven (NH); Penn Central (PC); Conrail (CR); Metro-North (MNCR)	-	Operational at the Grapevine Vintage Railroad in Grapevine, Texas.	Currently Grapevine Vintage 2016	
	21995	New Haven 2049	October 1960	New Haven (NH); Penn Central (PC); Conrail (CR); Metro-North (MNCR)	-	Awaiting repairs at the Railroad Museum of New England in Thomaston, Connecticut.	Currently numbered as 2019	
	22003	New Haven 2057	November 1960	New Haven (NH); Penn Central (PC); Conrail (CR); Metro-North (MNCR)	-	Display at the Connecticut Eastern Railroad Museum in Willimantic, Connecticut.	Currently numbered as 2023	
	22004	New Haven 2058	November 1960	New Haven (NH); Penn Central (PC); Conrail (CR); Metro-North (MNCR)	-	Operational, Owned by Webb Rail.	Renumbered to 2024 by Metro-North, has been renumbered back to 2058.	
	22005	New Haven 2059	November 1960	New Haven (NH); Penn Central (PC); Conrail (CR); Metro-North (MNCR)	1995	Stored at the Railroad Museum of New England in Thomaston, Connecticut.	Final F-Unit that EMD built. Currently Metro-North 2033.	

== F40C ==
Photograph	Works no.	Locomotive	Build date	Model	Former operators	Retire date	Disposition and location	Notes	References
	73612-1	Metra 611	April 1974	F40C	Milwaukee Road (MILW); Metra (METX)	-	Awaiting restoration at the Railroading Heritage of Midwest America in Silvis, Illinois		
	73689-2	Metra 614	May 1974	F40C	Milwaukee Road (MILW); Metra (METX)	-	Under restoration at the Illinois Railway Museum in Union, Illinois		

== F40PH ==
Photograph	Works no.	Locomotive	Build date	Model	Former operators	Retire date	Disposition and location	Notes	References
	777001-2	Amtrak 231	September 1977	F40PHR	Amtrak (AMTK); Daylight Locomotives & Machine Works (DLMX); Dynamic Rail (DYRX)	2001	Operational at the Illinois Railway Museum.		
	777001-8	Amtrak 237	August 1977	F40PHR	Amtrak (AMTK)	-	Operational at the Grand Canyon Railway in Williams, Arizona		
	777001-10	Amtrak 239	August 1977	F40PHR	Amtrak (AMTK)	-	Operational at the Grand Canyon Railway in Williams, Arizona		
	777018-15	Ohio Central 460	December 1977	F40M-2C	Amtrak (AMTK); Canadian American Railroad (CDAC); Ohio Central Railroad System (OHCR)	-	Display at the Age of Steam Roundhouse in Sugarcreek, Ohio	Built as Amtrak 269	
	777063-2	Amtrak 281	April 1978	F40PHR	Amtrak (AMTK)	2001	Operational at the California State Railroad Museum		
	777107-2	Amtrak 295	June 1979	F40PHR	Amtrak (AMTK)	-	Operational at the Grand Canyon Railway in Williams, Arizona		
	786140-8	Amtrak 307	May 1979	F40PH	Amtrak (AMTK)	-	Stored at the North Carolina Transportation Museum in Spencer, North Carolina.		
	796380-12	New Jersey Transit 4124	November 1981	F40PH-2	New Jersey Transit (NJT)	-	Operational at the Grand Canyon Railway in Williams, Arizona		
	796380-16	New Jersey Transit 4128	December 1981	F40PH-2	New Jersey Transit (NJT)	-	Operational at the Grand Canyon Railway in Williams, Arizona		
	796391-2	Ohio Central 452	November 1980	F40M-2C	Amtrak (AMTK); Canadian American Railroad (CDAC); Ohio Central Railroad System (OHCR)	-	Display at the Age of Steam Roundhouse in Sugarcreek, Ohio	Built as Amtrak 348	
	807050-2	Amtrak 365	May 1981	F40PHR	Amtrak (AMTK); Virginia Railway Express (VRE); Agence métropolitaine de transport (AMT); San Luis Central Railroad (SLC)	-	Operational at the Grand Canyon Railway in Williams, Arizona		
	847048-6	Metrolink 800	August 1985	F40PH-2	Amtrak (AMTK); Metrolink (SCAX)	2017	Operational as cab car at Southern California Railway Museum in Perris, California.		
	877008-1	Amtrak 401	December 1987	F40PHR	Amtrak (AMTK)	-	Awaiting restoration at the Grand Canyon Railway in Williams, Arizona		
	877008-7	Amtrak 407	January 1988	F40PHR	Amtrak (AMTK)	-	Awaiting restoration at the Grand Canyon Railway in Williams, Arizona		
	1193-03	Coaster 2103	October 1994	F40PHM-2C	Coaster (SDNX)	2021	Operational as cab car at Pacific Southwest Railway Museum in Campo, California.	Built by Morrison Knudsen	
	1193-05	Coaster 2105	November 1994	F40PHM-2C	Coaster (SDNX)	2021	Operational as cab car at Southern California Railway Museum in Perris, California.	Built by Morrison Knudsen	

== F45 ==
Photograph	Works no.	Locomotive	Build date	Model	Former operators	Retire date	Disposition and location	Notes	References
	34046	Santa Fe 5960	June 1968	F45/SDF45	Atchison, Topeka and Santa Fe Railway (AT&SF); Morrison Knudsen (MKCX); Utah Railway (UTAH); Great Northern Railway (GN) (Note: Though the Great Northern Railway went defunct in 1970, ATSF 90 was operated under BNSF and operated as a GN locomotive)	March 1994	On static display at Glacier National Park in Essex, Montana	Used as a lodge at the Izaak Walton Inn.	
	37184	Montana Rail Link 390	April 1971	F45	Burlington Northern Railroad (BN); New York, Susquehanna and Western Railway (NYSW); Montana Rail Link (MRL)	-	Stored in Airway Heights, Washington		

== FP45 ==
Photograph	Works no.	Locomotive	Build date	Model	Former operators	Retire date	Disposition and location	Notes	References
	33189	Santa Fe 90	December 1967	FP45u/SDFP45	Atchison, Topeka and Santa Fe Railway (AT&SF); BNSF	December 1999	On static display at the Oklahoma Railway Museum in Oklahoma City, Oklahoma		
	33191	Santa Fe 92	December 1967	FP45u/SDFP45	Atchison, Topeka and Santa Fe Railway (AT&SF)	January 1997	Operational at the Illinois Railway Museum in Union, Illinois		
	33192	Santa Fe 93	December 1967	FP45u/SDFP45	Atchison, Topeka and Santa Fe Railway (AT&SF)	1999	On static display at the Great Plains Transportation Museum in Wichita, Kansas		
	33194	Santa Fe 95	December 1967	FP45u/SDFP45	Atchison, Topeka and Santa Fe Railway (AT&SF)	-	Display at Western America Railroad Museum in Barstow, California		
	33196	Santa Fe 97	December 1967	FP45u/SDFP45	Atchison, Topeka and Santa Fe Railway (AT&SF); BNSF	-	Under restoration at the Museum of the American Railroad in Frisco, Texas	To be renumbered back to 107.	
	33197	Santa Fe 108	December 1967	FP45u/SDFP45	Atchison, Topeka and Santa Fe Railway (AT&SF); BNSF	September 1997	Operational at the Southern California Railway Museum in Perris, California		

== F59PH ==
Photograph	Works no.	Locomotive	Build date	Model	Former operators	Retire date	Disposition and location	Notes	References
	906128-1	Metrolink 851	May 1992	F59PHR	Metrolink (SCAX)	2020, 2024	Display at the Fullerton Train Museum in Fullerton, California	The first F59PH, and first locomotive, owned by Metrolink.	

== Formerly preserved, scrapped ==
Photograph	Works no.	Locomotive	Build date	Builder	Model	Former operators	Retire date	Last seen	Scrap date	Cause of scrapping	Notes	References
	4996	Edaville Railroad 1153	June 1947	EMD	FP10	Gulf, Mobile and Ohio Railroad (GM&O); Massachusetts Bay Transit Authority (MBTA); Metro North Commuter Railroad (MNCR); Edaville Railroad (ERR)	-	Edaville Railroad (ERR) in South Carver, Massachusetts	May 2025	King Richard's Faire moving into the ERR		
	A175	Ontario Northland 1501	March 1951	GMD	FP7A	Ontario Northland Railway (ONT)	1996	North Bay, Ontario	2008	Poor condition		
	A373	Quebec Central 1302	September 1952	GMD	FP7A	Canadian Pacific Railway (CP); Société de Transport de la Communauté Urbaine de Montréal (STCUM); Agence métropolitaine de transport (AMTL); Quebec Central Railway (QCR)	-	East Broughton, Quebec	2016	Poor condition		
	A374	Quebec Central 1303	September 1952	GMD	FP7A	Canadian Pacific Railway (CP); Société de Transport de la Communauté Urbaine de Montréal (STCUM); Agence métropolitaine de transport (AMTL); Trains Touristiques de Chaudiere-Appalaches (TTCA); Quebec Central Railway (QCR)	-	Quebec Central Railway (QCR) in Sherbrooke, Quebec	2006	Cannibalized for spare parts for QCR 1301		
	A376	Quebec Central 1305	October 1952	GMD	FP7A	Canadian Pacific Railway (CP); Société de Transport de la Communauté Urbaine de Montréal (STCUM); Agence métropolitaine de transport (AMTL); Quebec Central Railway (QCR)	-	Vallée-Jonction, Quebec	September 2009	Poor condition		

== See also ==
- List of preserved EMD locomotives
- List of preserved EMD E-series locomotives
