= List of preserved EMD E-series locomotives =

This is a summary, listing every locomotive from the EMD E-series that are in preservation.

== EA/EB ==
Photograph	Works no.	Locomotive	Build date	Model	Former operators	Retire date	Disposition and location	Notes	References
	666	Baltimore and Ohio 51	May 16, 1937	EA	Baltimore and Ohio Railroad (B&O)	-	On static display at the Baltimore and Ohio Railroad Museum in Baltimore, Maryland	GMC Class DE	

== E3 ==
Photograph	Works no.	Locomotive	Build date	Model	Former operators	Retire date	Disposition and location	Notes	References
	959	Atlantic Coast Line 501	November 1939	E6A	Atlantic Coast Line Railroad; Wisconsin Western Railroad	-	Operational at the North Carolina Transportation Museum	Originally built as an E3A, rebuilt as an E6A	

== E5 ==
Photograph	Works no.	Locomotive	Build date	Model	Former operators	Retire date	Disposition and location	Notes	References
	968	Chicago, Burlington and Quincy 9911A Silver Pilot	February 1940	E5A	Chicago, Burlington and Quincy Railroad (CB&Q); Colorado and Southern Railroad (C&S)	1968	Operational at the Illinois Railway Museum in Union, Illinois		

== E6 ==
Photograph	Works no.	Locomotive	Build date	Model	Former operators	Retire date	Disposition and location	Notes	References
	1424	Rock Island 630	October 1941	E6A	Chicago, Rock Island and Pacific Railroad; Midland Railway	-	Owned by the under-construction Manly Junction Railroad Museum in Manly, Iowa		
	1615	Louisville & Nashville #770	1942	E6A	Louisville and Nashville Railroad		Static display at the Kentucky Railway Museum		

== E7 ==
Photograph	Works no.	Locomotive	Build date	Model	Former operators	Retire date	Disposition and location	Notes	References
	3357	Pennsylvania Railroad 5901	September 1945	E7A	Pennsylvania Railroad (PRR); Penn Central Transportation Company (PC)	-	On static display at the Railroad Museum of Pennsylvania, in Strasburg, Pennsylvania	PRR Class EP-20	

== E8 ==
Photograph	Works no.	Locomotive	Build date	Model	Former operators	Retire date	Disposition and location	Notes	References
	9529	Richmond, Fredericksburg and Potomac 1002	November 1949	E8A	Richmond, Fredericksburg and Potomac Railroad (RFP)		Stored at the Virginia Museum of Transportation in Roanoke, Virginia.		
	9675	Aberdeen, Carolina and Western Railway 100	December 1949	E9AM	Chicago, Burlington, and Quincy Railroad (CB&Q); Burlington Northern Railroad (BN); Illinois Central Railroad (IC); Iowa Pacific Holdings (IPH)	July 1992 (BN); 2014 (IC)	Operational (executive train)		
	9677	Chicago, Burlington and Quincy 9939A	January 1950	E9AM	Chicago, Burlington and Quincy Railroad (CB&Q); Burlington Northern Railroad (BN); Maryland Area Rail Commuter (MARC)	December 1992	On static display at the National Museum of Transportation in St. Louis, Missouri	Named "Village of Westmont" by BN when rebuilt as an E9AM.	
	9679	Canadian National 102	January 1950	E9AM	Chicago, Burlington and Quincy Railroad (CB&Q); Burlington Northern Railroad (BN); Illinois Central Railroad (IC); Canadian National Railway (CN)	August 1992	On static display at the Monticello Railway Museum in Monticello, Illinois	Named "City of Naperville" by BN when rebuilt as an E9AM.	
	10233	Baltimore and Ohio 92	September 1950	E8A	Baltimore and Ohio Railroad (B&O); Amtrak (AMTK); United States Department of Transportation (DOTX)	-	Awaiting restoration, Owned by the West Virginia Railroad Museum in Elkins, West Virginia		
	10425	Pennsylvania Railroad 5888	April 1950	E8A	Pennsylvania Railroad (PRR); Penn Central (PC); Amtrak (AMTK)	-	Undergoing restoration at the Railway Museum of Greater Cincinnati		
	11493	Chicago and North Western 5022A	July 1950	E8A	Chicago and North Western Railroad (CNW); Metra (METX)	-	Stored at the Arizona Railway Museum in Chandler, Arizona		
	12231	Erie Railroad 833	March 1951	E8A	Erie Railroad (ERIE); Erie Lackawanna (EL); Conrail (CR); New York & Greenwood Lake (NYGL)	-	Operational, Based at the turntable in Port Jervis, New York.		
	13102	Pennsylvania Railroad 5809	January 1951	E8A	Pennsylvania Railroad (PRR); Penn Central Transportation Company (PC); Amtrak (AMTK); Conrail (CR)	-	Owned by the Juniata Terminal Company	PRR Class EP-22	
	13113	Pennsylvania Railroad 5898	March 1951	E8A	Pennsylvania Railroad (PRR); Penn Central Transportation Company (PC); Amtrak (AMTK); Blue Mountain & Reading (BM&R)	-	Operational on the St. Louis, Iron Mountain and Southern Railway in Jackson, Missouri	PRR Class EP-22	
	14172	Southern 6900	September 1951	E8A	Southern Railway (SOU)	-	Operational, Based at the North Carolina Transportation Museum in Spencer, North Carolina.		
	14173	Southern 6901	September 1951	E8A	Southern Railway (SOU); New Georgia Railroad (NGRR)	-	Operational, Based at the Southeastern Railway Museum in Duluth, Georgia.		
	14420	Wabash 1009	June 1951	E8A	Wabash Railroad (WAB)	-	Operational, Based at the Virginia Museum of Transportation in Roanoke, Virginia.	10,000th Locomotive built by EMD.	
	15199	Rock Island 652	February 1952	E8A	Chicago, Rock Island and Pacific Railroad (CRI&P); Midland Railway (LLG)	-	Owned by the under-construction Manly Junction Railroad Museum in Manly, Iowa		
	15659	Florida East Coast 1594	May 1952	E8A	Pennsylvania Railroad (PRR); Penn Central (PC); Conrail (CR); MBTA Commuter Rail (MBTX); American Association of Private Railcar Owners (PPCX)	-	Awaiting repairs at the Gold Coast Railroad Museum in Miami, Florida		
	16780	Pennsylvania Railroad 5711	October 1952	E8A	Pennsylvania Railroad (PRR); Penn Central Transportation Company (PC); Amtrak (AMTK); Conrail (CR)	-	Owned by the Juniata Terminal Company	PRR Class EP-22	
	16788	"New York Central 4097"	November 1952	E8A	Pennsylvania Railroad (PRR); Penn Central (PC); Massachusetts Bay Transportation Authority (MBTA)	-	Private ownership in Connecticut.	Never operated on the NYC. Previously on display in New York Central colors at Duanesburg, New York until previous owner passed.	
	16790	Pennsylvania 5764	November 1952	E8A	Pennsylvania Railroad (PRR); Penn Central (PC); Massachusetts Bay Transportation Authority (MBTA); Tennessee Central Railway Museum (TCRX)	-	Under restoration at the Monticello Railway Museum in Monticello, Illinois.	Being restored as Illinois Central 4044.	
	18117	Chicago and North Western 5028A	June 1953	E8A	Chicago and North Western Railway (CNW); Metra/Regional Transportation Authority (METX/RTA); Kalamazoo, Lake Shore & Chicago (KLSC)	-	Static display at The Historic Railpark and Train Museum in Bowling Green, Kentucky	Cosmetically altered to look like Louisville & Nashville 796, another E8A that was scrapped in the 70's. 5028A never operated for the L&N.	
	18120	Chicago and North Western 515	June 1953	E8A	Chicago and North Western Railway (CNW); Metra (METX); Arizona Eastern Railway (AZER); Iowa Pacific	-	Operational at the Illinois Railway Museum in Union, Illinois		
	18273	Union Pacific 942	May 1953	E8Am	Union Pacific Railroad (UP); Chicago and North Western Railway (CNW); Metra/Regional Transportation Authority (METX/RTA)	-	Operational at the Southern California Railway Museum in Perris, California		
	18319	Aberdeen, Carolina and Western Railway 101	September 1953	E9AM	Chicago, Burlington, and Quincy Railroad (CB&Q); Burlington Northern Railroad (BN); Illinois Central Railroad (IC); Iowa Pacific Holdings (IPH)	July 1992 (BN); 2014 (IC)			
	18526	New York Central 4068	June 1953	E8A	New York Central Railroad (NYC); Penn Central (PC); New Jersey Transit (NJT)	-	Static display at the Medina Railroad Museum in Medina, New York		
	18526	New York Central 4070	June 1953	E8A	New York Central Railroad (NYC); Penn Central (PC); Conrail (CR)	-	Private storage in Bellevue, Ohio		
	18534	New York Central 4076	July 1953	E8A	New York Central Railroad (NYC); Penn Central (PC); Conrail (CR); New Jersey Transit (NJT)	-	Display at the United Railroad Historical Society of New Jersey in Boonton, New Jersey		
	18538	New York Central 4080	August 1953	E8A	New York Central Railroad (NYC); Penn Central (PC); New Jersey Transit (NJT)	-	Static display at the Medina Railroad Museum in Medina, New York		
	18541	New York Central 4083	August 1953	E8A	New York Central Railroad (NYC); Penn Central (PC); New Jersey Transit (NJT)	-	Display at the United Railroad Historical Society of New Jersey in Boonton, New Jersey		
	18542	CaterParrott Railnet 5000	August 1953	E8A	New York Central Railroad (NYC); Penn Central (PC); New Jersey Transit (NJT); New Georgia Railroad (NGRR); Tennessee Central Railway Museum (TCRX)	-	Operational, owned by CaterParrott Railnet in Nashville, Georgia		
	18543	New York Central 4085	August 1953	E8A	New York Central Railroad (NYC); Penn Central (PC); New Jersey Transit (NJT)	-	Static display at the National New York Central Railroad Museum in Elkhart, Indiana	Led final eastbound 20th Century Limited	
	19011	Southern 6913	December 1953	E8A	Southern Railway (SOU); New Jersey Transit (NJT)	-	Restoration, Based at the Southern Appalachia Railway Museum.		
	19012	Southern 6914	December 1953	E8A	Southern Railway (SOU); New Jersey Transit (NJT)	-	Restoration, Based at the Tennessee Valley Railroad Museum in Chattanooga, Tennessee.		
	20494	Aberdeen, Carolina and Western Railway 103	January 1950	E9AM	Chicago, Burlington, and Quincy Railroad (CB&Q); Burlington Northern Railroad (BN); Illinois Central Railroad (IC); Iowa Pacific Holdings (IPH)	2014 (IC use)			

== E9 ==
Photograph	Works no.	Locomotive	Build date	Model	Former operators	Retire date	Disposition and location	Notes	References
	18318	Burlington Northern 9976	September 1953	E9AM	Chicago, Burlington and Quincy Railroad (CB&Q); Burlington Northern Railroad (BN); Maryland Area Rail Commuter (MARC)	July 1992 (BN); 2005 (MARC)	Operational at the Illinois Railway Museum in Union, Illinois		
	19634	CaterParrott Railnet 5001	August 1954	E9A	Chicago, Burlington and Quincy Railroad (CB&Q); Burlington Northern Railroad (BN); Nashville and Eastern Railroad (NERR); Larry's Truck and Electric (LTEX); San Luis and Rio Grande (SLRG)	July 1992 (BN)			
	20100	Southern Pacific 6051	December 1954	E9A	Southern Pacific Transportation Company (SP)	December 24, 1969	Operational at the California State Railroad Museum in Sacramento, California		
	20507	Wisconsin and Southern 102	September 1955	E9B	Union Pacific Railroad (UP); Amtrak (AMTK); Michigan Northern Railway (MNR); Wisconsin and Southern Railroad (W&S); San Luis and Rio Grande Railroad (SLRG)	1975 (as locomotive); 1983 (as Amtrak steam generator car)	Operational at the Illinois Railway Museum in Union, Illinois	Rebuilt into a steam generator car in 1975, rebuilt back into a locomotive in 2008	
	20535	Canadian National 103	December 1955	E9AM	Chicago, Burlington and Quincy Railroad (CB&Q); Burlington Northern Railroad (BN); Illinois Central Railroad (IC); Canadian National Railway (CN)	October 1992	On static display at the National Railroad Museum in Green Bay, Wisconsin	Named "James M. Gagen" by BN when rebuilt as an E9AM.	
	20538	Burlington Northern 9912	January 1956	E9AM	Chicago, Burlington and Quincy Railroad (CB&Q); Burlington Northern Railroad (BN)	July 1992	Stored at the Tennessee Central Railway Museum in Nashville, Tennessee		
	20540	Burlington Route 9913	January 1956	E9A	Chicago, Burlington and Quincy Railroad (CB&Q); Burlington Northern Railroad (BN); American Association of Private Railcar Owners (PPCX)	October 1992	Operational at the Gold Coast Railroad Museum in Miami, Florida		
	20541	Burlington Northern 3	1956	E9AM	Chicago, Burlington and Quincy Railroad (CB&Q); Burlington Northern Railroad (BN); Burlington Northern and Santa Fe Railway (BNSF)	1990 (in commuter service); September 1997 (as part of the BN executive train)	Operational at the Illinois Railway Museum in Union, Illinois		
	21608	Milwaukee Road 33C	1956	E9A	Milwaukee Road (MILW)	-	Undergoing restoration to operating condition at the Illinois Railway Museum in Union, Illinois		
	26567	Milwaukee Road 37A	1961	E9A	Milwaukee Road (MILW)	-	Stored at the Illinois Railway Museum in Union, Illinois		
	20486	Union Pacific 949	May 1955	E9A	Union Pacific Railroad; Chicago and North Western Railway; Metra	September 1972	Stored at the Union Pacific Railroad shops in Cheyenne, Wyoming	Part of the Union Pacific heritage fleet	
	20488	Union Pacific 951	May 1955	E9A	Union Pacific Railroad	-	Stored at the Union Pacific Railroad shops in Cheyenne, Wyoming	Part of the Union Pacific heritage fleet	
	20510	Union Pacific 963B	October 1955	E9B	Union Pacific Railroad (UP); Amtrak (AMTK)	June 1972	Stored at the Union Pacific Railroad shops in Cheyenne, Wyoming	Part of the Union Pacific heritage fleet	
	21065	Milwaukee Road 32A	April 1956	E9A	Milwaukee Road (MILW); Amtrak (AMTK); Alaska Railroad (ARR); Northern Car Leasing; Wisconsin and Southern Railroad (WSOR)	-	Operational, owned by the Friends of the 261 in Minneapolis, Minnesota.		
	26565	Milwaukee Road 36A	April 1961	E9A	Milwaukee Road (MILW); Indiana Railroad (INRD); Montana Rail Link (MRL)	-	Display in Deer Lodge, Montana.		
	26673	Amtrak 4037	August 1961	E9A	Union Pacific Railroad (UP); Amtrak (AMTK)	December 1973	On static display at the Louisiana Steam Train Association in New Orleans, Louisiana		
	28668	"New York Central 4096"	December 1963	E9A	Union Pacific Railroad (UP); Amtrak (AMTK); Danbury Railway Museum (DRMX)	September 1972	On static display in New York Central colors at the C&O Heritage Center in Clifton Forge, Virginia	Never actually operated on the NYC	

== Formerly preserved, scrapped ==
Photograph	Works no.	Locomotive	Build date	Model	Former operators	Retire date	Last seen	Scrap date	Cause of scrapping	Notes	References
	10779	Union Pacific 928	July 1950	E9A	Union Pacific Railroad (UP)	July 31, 1980	Cheyenne, Wyoming	May 19, 2013	Negligence and vandalism		
	16775	Pennsylvania Railroad 5706	September 1952	E8A	Pennsylvania Railroad (PRR); Penn Central Transportation Company (PC); Amtrak (AMTK); Blue Mountain & Reading (BM&R)	-	Grants Mill Station in Irondale, Alabama	2021	Sat at a parking lot of a strip mall; strip mall decided to remove it for the needs of a new parking lot	PRR Class EP-22	

== See also ==
- List of preserved EMD locomotives
- List of preserved EMD F-series locomotives
