= Chicago, Rock Island and Pacific Railroad (2017) =

Railroad operating in the United States

Chicago Rock Island & Pacific Railroad

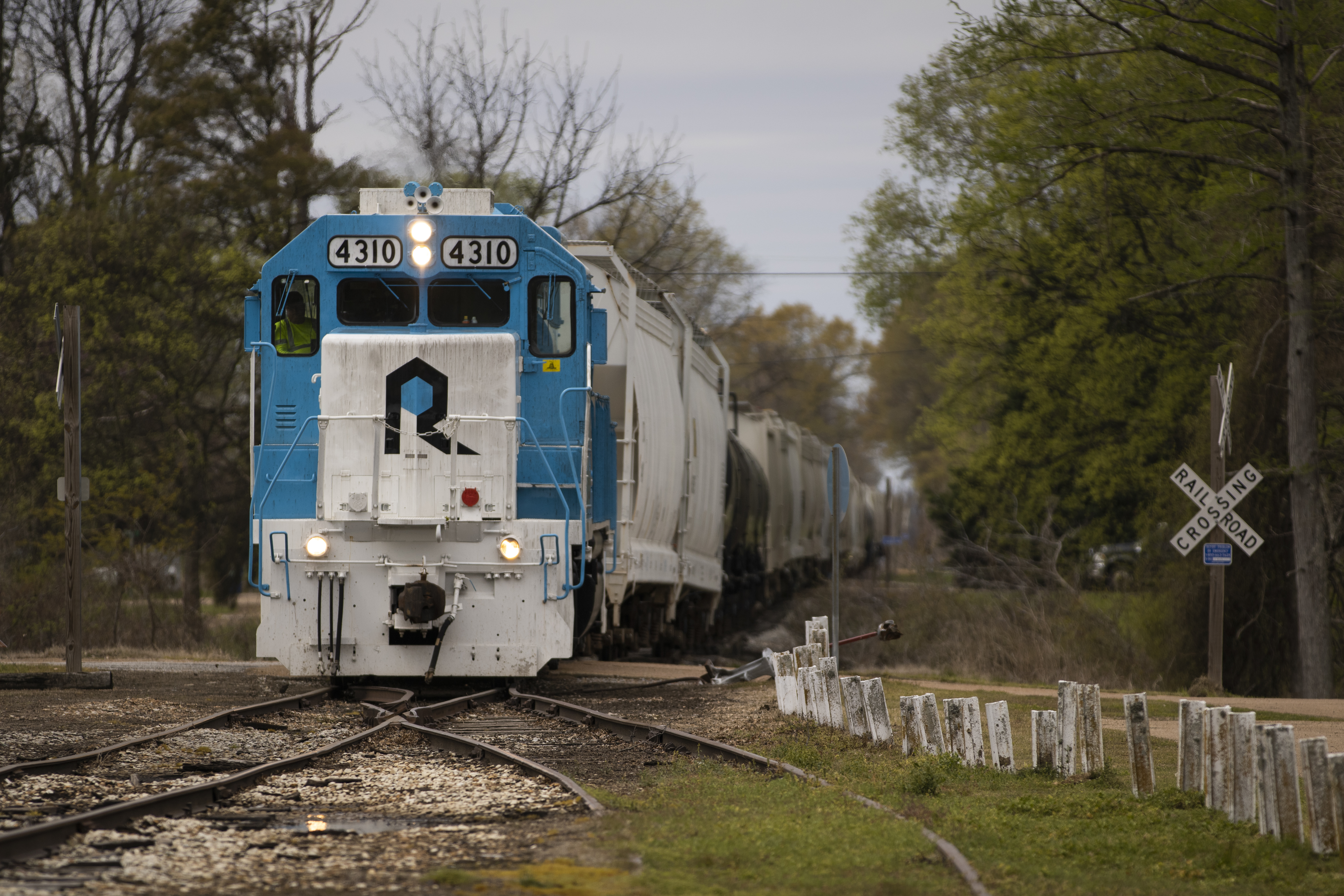
- Rock Island freight train in 2021

Overview
- Headquarters: Hernando, Mississippi
- Reporting mark: RILX, RI, GSI & ON
- Locale: Mississippi, Kansas
- Dates of operation: 2017–present

Technical
- Track gauge: 1,435 mm (4 ft 8 1/2 in)
- Length: 163 miles (262 km)

Other
- Website: Official website

The Chicago Rock Island & Pacific Railroad LLC (reporting mark RI) is an American Class III railroad operating in Mississippi and Kansas. It uses the name and the most recent corporate identity of the first Chicago, Rock Island and Pacific Railroad (1852–1980).

== History ==
After a career of about 15 years with Union Pacific and Canadian National (CN), Robert J. Riley began to offer contract switching services around 2010. In 2017, he obtained the rights to the name Chicago, Rock Island and Pacific Railroad including their "The Rock" trademark and incorporated his own company of that name in Hernando, Mississippi.

In early 2019, the new Rock Island Rail concluded an agreement with Coahoma County in north-west Mississippi to lease and operate the county's 60-mile Mississippi Delta Railroad, starting March 1, 2019. The lease with the prior operator, C&J Railroad Company, had been terminated effective February 8, 2019. Startup by March 1 was delayed, as the Surface Transportation Board approval was slowed down by partial references to an older operator, Gulf and Ohio Railways d.b.a. Mississippi Delta Railroad, and appeals by both C&J Railroad and CN's Illinois Central Railroad. After the withdrawal of C&J Railroad's objection and rejection of CN's appeal, a second application to the STB on May 22, 2019, was approved on June 7, 2019. It grants Rock Island Rail common carrier operation on about 0.2 miles of track at Swan Lake, Mississippi. The rest of the county's infrastructure had been relegated to non-common carrier, contract service back in 2001. There, Rock Island Rail's first revenue run took place on April 28, 2019. Since then, the company currently operates freight service on the Mississippi Delta Railroad. It serves some local customers, but primarily uses the infrastructure to store empty or loaded (Storage in transit) rail cars.

In November 2024, Coahoma County requested lease proposals for the Mississippi Delta Railroad. The highest bidder was American Services Rail (ASR). In March 2025, ASR filed a verified notice with the Surface Transportation Board to take over operations on Mississippi Delta Railroad.

Rock Island Rail is also planning to reopen the rail line between the river port of Rosedale, Mississippi, and Greenville, Mississippi. The county owned port authority had acquired this line from Illinois Central in 1981 and operated it under the name Great River Railroad until 2001, when the tracks had to be embargoed. In August 2020, Bolivar County and Rock Island Rail agreed to start clearing and repairing the infrastructure.

On December 21, 2020, Robert Riley registered a company called Gulf & Ship Island Railroad LLC which is also using a classic railroad's name: A Gulf & Ship Island Railroad already existed between 1882 and 1925. In May 2021, Harrison County and Rock Island Rail announced that the latter's Gulf & Ship Island Railroad in cooperation with Kansas City Southern Railway is to resume operations on the Seaway lead in the Bernard Bayou industrial park in Gulfport.

On February 18, 2023, Rock Island Rail acquired the track, rolling assets and real estate from the Midland Railway Historical Association and its subsidiary the Leavenworth, Lawrence & Galveston Railroad, doing business as the Baldwin City & Southern Railroad. That became the property of the wholly owned subsidiary called Ottawa Northern Railroad ("ONR"). ONR plans to continue the tourist operations, as well as resume freight operations. ONR interchanges with the BNSF at Ottawa, Kansas, and extends north to Baldwin City, Kansas.

On February 26, 2024, the Oklahoma Department of Transportation ("ODOT") as well as the Blackwell Industrial Authority petitioned the Surface Transportation Board to allow Rock Island Rail to resume operations on the Blackwell Northern Gateway Railroad, which had previously been shut down by FRA emergency order on February 2, 2024. In August of 2024, a Rock Island Rail affiliate, the Oklahoma and Kansas Railroad, was granted a long-term lease for the line, as approved by the Surface Transportation Board on September 27, 2024. However, on October 11, ODOT informed the Oklahoma and Kansas Railroad that its lease was being terminated, alleging that the operator had made no effort to rehabilitate the line. ODOT then began seeking a new operator for the trackage.

== Infrastructure ==
Coahoma County's rail infrastructure, summarily called Mississippi Delta Railroad, is about 85 miles (137 km) long and consists of three lines. The part from Lula through Coahoma, Lyon and Clarksdale to a point called Dolan, southwest of Clarksdale, is part of the former Louisville, New Orleans and Texas Railway's main line from New Orleans to Memphis. The sections immediately north of Lula and south of Dolan were abandoned by the early 1980s. The line from Clarksdale to Tutwiler, Sumner and Swan Lake near Glendora was built as a branch line. In Clarksdale, both lines are connected through a wye within an extensive rail yard. From Lula, another branch leads south to Jonestown. The county purchased the lines from three different owners in 2001.

== Traffic ==
Rock Island Rail uses the Mississippi Delta Railroad primarily to store empty or loaded rail cars. By its own accounts, up to 2100 cars can be stored at a time. Additionally, the company offers to serve customer sidings along the network and team tracks at Sumner, Clarksdale and Coahoma. Interchange to the rest of the American railroad network is with CN at Swan Lake.

The Ottawa Northern Railroad is likewise used for car storage, although excursion trains are planned to be operated in the near future.

== Equipment ==
The company owns several diesel locomotives. Two EMD GP38 (road numbers 4310 and 4373) were painted in the "reborn blue"-Rock Island paint scheme, closely mirroring the appearance of the first Rock Island's EMD GP38-2 in livery, decals, naming and details like the Gadsden flag stickers on the doors. In early 2021, an EMD GP15-1 (#1106) was repainted likewise. Rock Island Rail additionally owns an EMD GP30 (#3024), two former BNSF SD38P's (rebuilt SD35s) (#’s 1555 and 1559), a GP20E (#2003), a GE C40-8 (#2127), a NW2R switcher (#109), a former Amtrak F40PHR (#310, originally AMTK 392), at least six Cabooses and some freight cars. In May 2021, #2127 was painted in the Red and Yellow Rock Island scheme that used to be on the first CRIP's older equipment. Light maintenance of the equipment takes place in Sumner, as Rock Island Rail is not using the small depot in Clarksdale which had been utilized by the previous two operators of Mississippi Delta Railroad. Currently, GP15-1 #1106 and NW2R #767 operate on the Gulf & Ship Island Railroad.
