= KNBU =

- Baldwin City, Kansas; United States
- Frequency: 89.7 MHz
- Branding: 89.7 The Edge

Programming
- Format: Defunct (formerly Educational)

Ownership
- Owner: Baker University

History
- First air date: November 29, 1965
- Last air date: April 28, 2017 (date of license cancellation)

Technical information
- Licensing authority: FCC
- Facility ID: 3630
- Class: A
- ERP: 100 watts
- HAAT: 36.0 meters
- Transmitter coordinates: 38°46′45.00″N 95°11′15.00″W

Links
- Public license information: Public file; LMS
- Webcast: Listen live

KNBU (89.7 FM; "The Edge") was a non-profit educational radio station licensed to Baldwin City, Kansas, United States. The station was owned and operated by Baker University.

KNBU signed on November 29, 1965. On April 20, 2017, Baker University informed the Federal Communications Commission (FCC) that it would surrender the KNBU license effective May 15; on April 28, the FCC canceled the station's license.
