= Norwood, Kansas =

Ghost town in Franklin County, Kansas

- Ghost Town
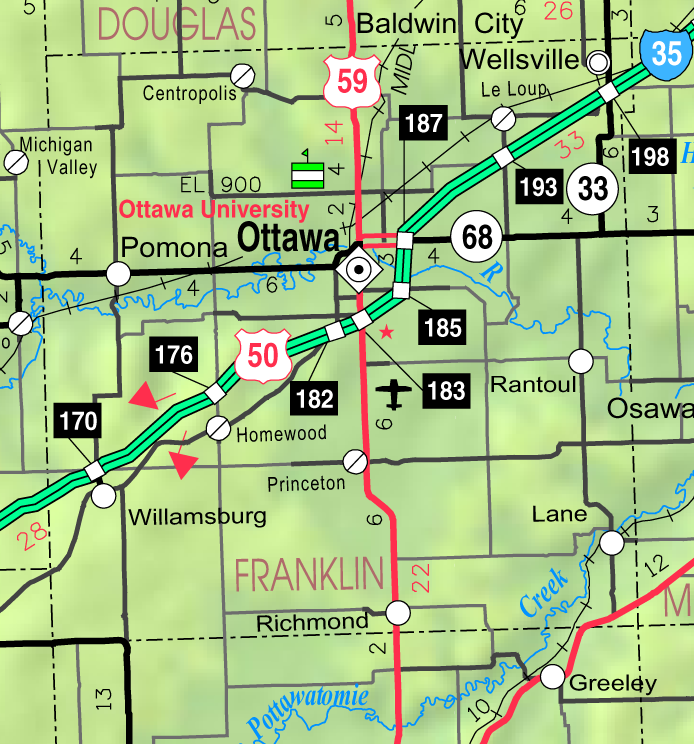
- KDOT map of Franklin County (legend)

- Location within Kansas Location within the United States
- Coordinates: 38°42′35″N 95°14′49″W
- Country: United States
- State: Kansas
- County: Franklin
- Elevation: 948 ft (289 m)

Population
  - Total: 0
- Time zone: UTC-6 (CST)
  - Summer (DST): UTC-5 (CDT)
- FIPS code: 20-51610
- GNIS ID: 484888

Norwood is a ghost town in north Franklin County, Kansas, United States. It is located approximately 1.25 miles (2.01 km) east of U.S. Route 59 on Stafford Road, and 2 miles (3.2 km) south of the Franklin-Douglas county line.

== History ==
The town was named after Henry Ward Beecher's novel Norwood: or, Village Life in New England. A post office was established at Norwood in 1868 which closed and reopened a few times until it closed permanently in 1914.

Today, the city is considered a ghost town, having served only as a stop on the recreational Midland Railway before it was replaced by the Ottawa Northern Railroad. The town now consists of one house, one train depot, and public restroom facilities.
