= MSDR =

MSDR may refer to:

- Manchester South District Railway, a former railway line in Manchester, UK
- Mississippi Delta Railroad, a railroad company in Mississippi, United States
