= Baldwin High School (Kansas) =

Coordinates: 38°47′8.4″N 95°10′57.2″W

Location
- 415 Eisenhower; Baldwin City, Douglas, Kansas; United States

Information
- School type: Public high school
- Established: 1923, moved to current building in 1995
- School district: Baldwin City USD 348
- Principal: Brant Brittingham
- Teaching staff: 31.79 (FTE)
- Grades: 9-12
- Enrollment: 437 (2024–2025)
- Student to teacher ratio: 13.75
- Campus: Urban
- Colors: Purple and White
- Athletics conference: Frontier League
- Mascot: Bulldog
- Website: School Website

Baldwin High School is a public secondary school in Baldwin, Kansas, United States. It is operated by the Baldwin City USD 348 school district.

== History ==
Baldwin High School was first built and occupied in 1888. In 1923, a new school building was constructed on the same site. A gymnasium and auditorium were added in 1942. Despite construction being halted by World War II, the community rallied to finish it. A new building was built once again in 1956 with the old building being repurposed. The school's current building was first occupied in 1995. In 2015, the high school building built in 1923 along with the gymnasium and auditorium added in 1942 were added to the National Historic Places list.

== Athletics ==
Baldwin High School offers many different sports and extracurricular programs for its students. The Bulldogs are classified as a 4A (3A for football) school by the Kansas State High School Activities Association. Additionally, the Bulldogs have won several state championships in both athletic and non-athletic programs. They were ranked #1 in the 1968 2A state poll and won the 1981 4A state championship. The girls' basketball program has won three 4A state titles in 1982, 1996, and 2018.

== See also ==
- List of high schools in Kansas
- List of unified school districts in Kansas
