= Great River Railroad =

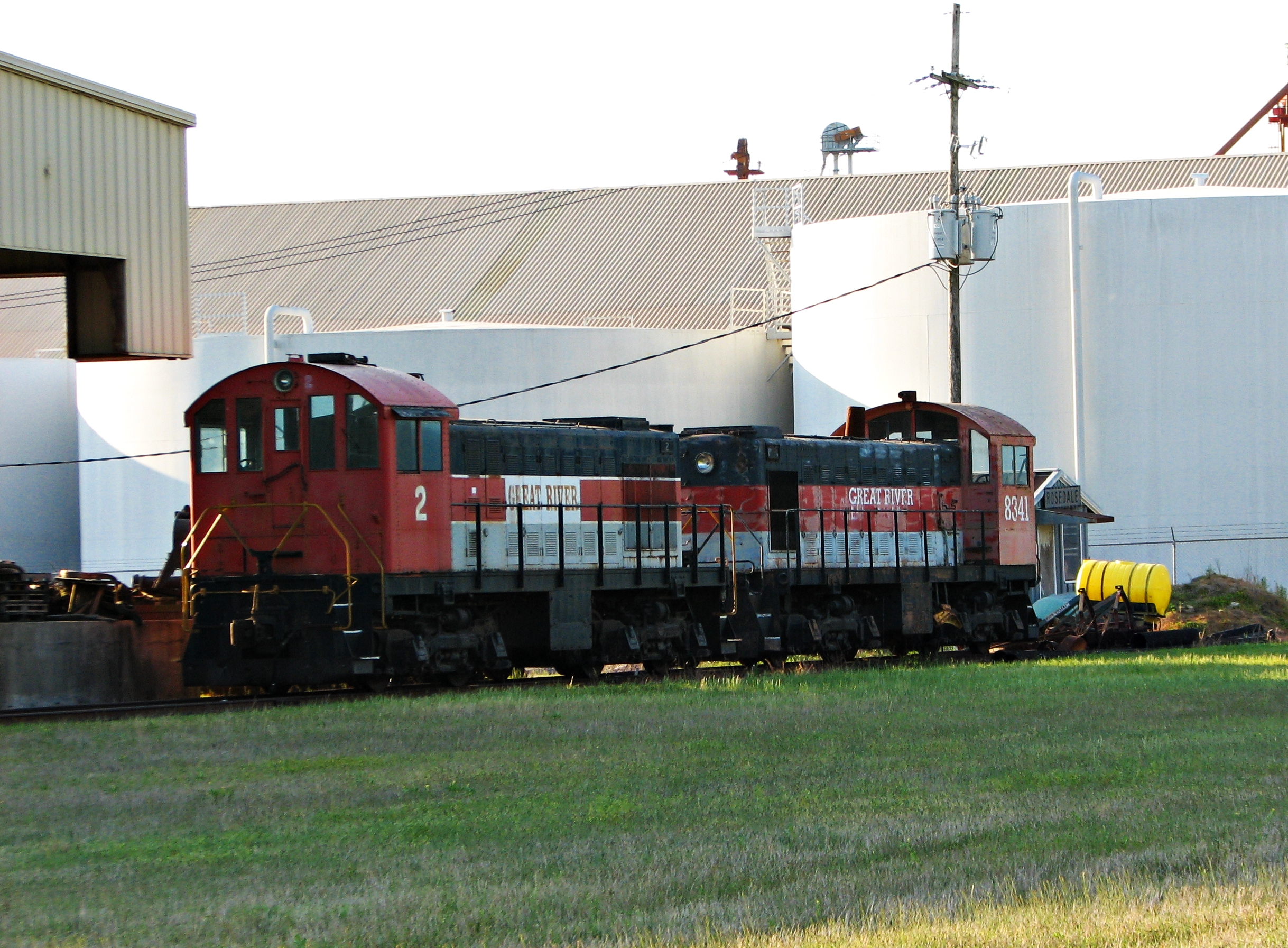
- GTR's two locomotives at the Port of Rosedale

Overview
- Headquarters: Rosedale, Mississippi
- Reporting mark: GTR
- Dates of operation: 1981–2001

Technical
- Track gauge: 4 ft 8 1/2 in (1,435 mm) standard gauge
- Length: 32.45 miles (52.22 km)

Other
- Website: http://www.portofrosedale.com

The Great River Railroad (reporting mark GTR) is a 32.45-mile-long (52.22 km) shortline railroad that runs from Rosedale to a connection with the Columbus and Greenville Railway in Greenville, Mississippi.

Formerly part of Illinois Central Gulf, the railroad segment was purchased by the Port of Rosedale in 1981. The line has been embargoed since 2001.

Bolivar County and Chicago, Rock Island and Pacific Railroad (Rock Island Rail) are planning to reopen the rail line. In August 2020, the county-owned port authority and Rock Island Rail agreed to start clearing and repairing the infrastructure.

== Motive Power ==
GTR has two switcher locomotives, both of them which are ex-US Army and stored at the Port of Rosedale

- ALCO S-1 GTR 8341.
- ALCO S-2 GTR 2.
