= Mississippi Delta Railroad =

60 mile rail line

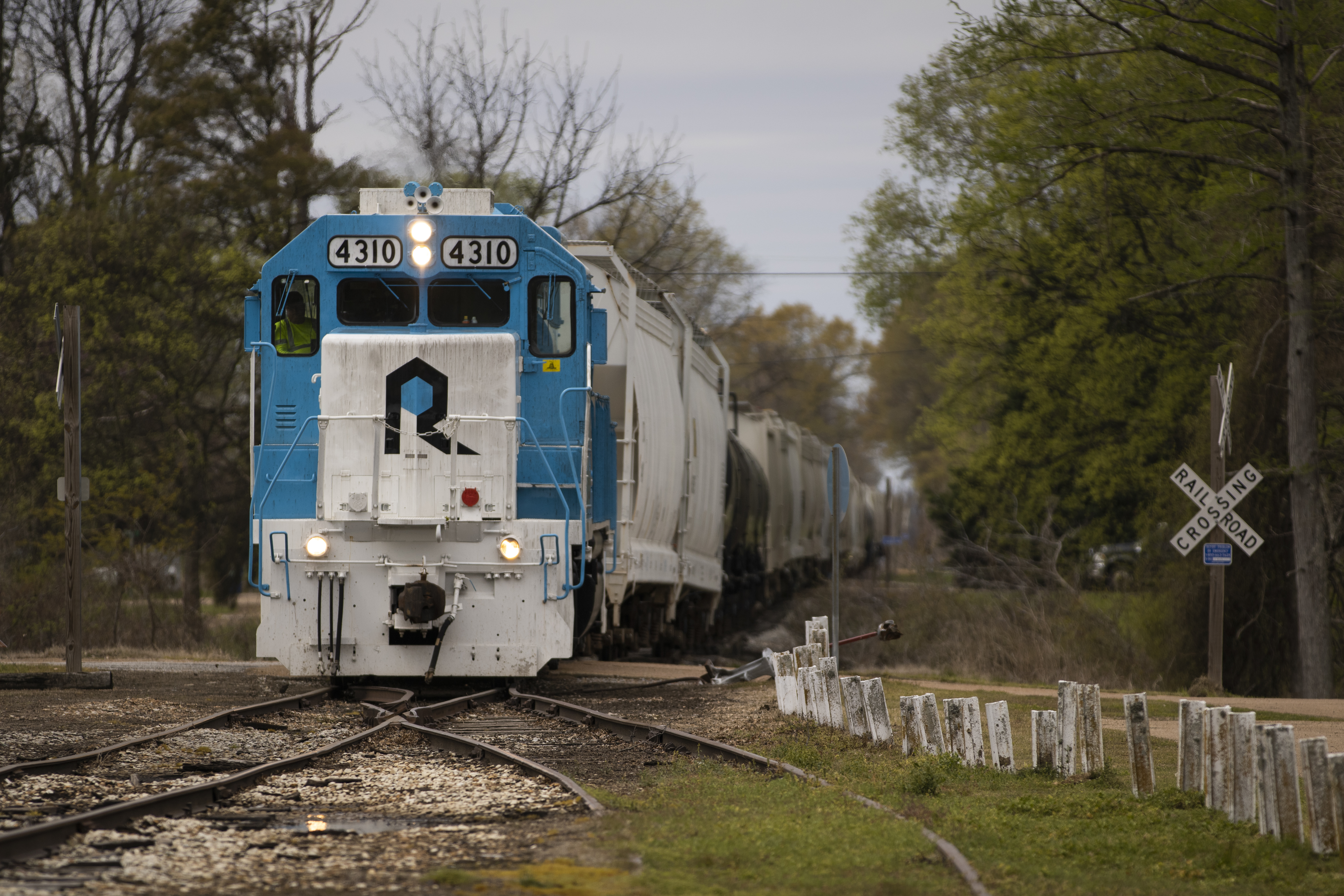
- Storage car train in Tutwiler on March 31, 2021

Overview
- Parent company: Gulf and Ohio Railways (1985–2019); Rock Island Rail (2019–2025); American Services Rail (planned transfer of operations)
- Headquarters: Clarksdale, Mississippi
- Reporting mark: MSDR
- Locale: Northwest Mississippi
- Dates of operation: 1985–
- Predecessor: Illinois Central
- Successor: Rock Island Rail

Technical
- Track gauge: 4 ft 8 1/2 in (1,435 mm) standard gauge
- Length: 60 mi (97 km)

The Mississippi Delta Railroad (reporting mark MSDR) is a shortline railroad company operating from Swan Lake to Jonestown, Mississippi, a distance of 60 miles (97 km); the railroad interchanges with the Canadian National at Swan Lake. Currently the railroad is owned by Coahoma County and was a former subsidiary of Gulf and Ohio Railways shortline group.

Primary commodities include PVC, polystyrene, plastics, paper, corn, cottonseed products, propane, and rubber (all mostly as storage-in-transit, little on-line business), all of which generates approximately 5,500 annual carloads. Interchange is made with Canadian National Railway at Swan Lake.

== History ==
The Louisville, New Orleans, & Texas railroad completed construction of the railroad between Clarksdale and Lula in 1884. The Yazoo & Mississippi Valley gained control of the line by 1885 and subsequently fell under the control of the Illinois Central in 1892 upon their acquisition of the Y&MV. The Lula–Jonestown route was constructed by the Mobile & North Western railroad in 1879 and later acquired by the Y&MV.

Gulf & Ohio began operation of the Mississippi Delta Railroad in 1985. This included operation of the Delta Oil Mill private railroad from Lula to Jonestown, as well as the route from Lyon and Swan Lake leased from the Illinois Central.

The railroad hauled soybeans, cotton seed byproducts, lint, carbon black, and rubber, with traffic amounting to nearly 4,000 annual carloads in 1995. Annual carloads on the Mississippi Delta railroad declined from 3,273 in 1997, 1,709 in 1998, 591 in 1999, to only 296 by the year 2000. This amount was insufficient to cover the costs of operating the line, as the resulting annual freight revenue fell from $478,298 in 1998 to only $71,069 in 2000. The sharp drop in line traffic and revenue after 1997 was attributed to the closure of the Archer Daniels Midland soybean processing plant in Clarksdale, which accounted for 61% of traffic.

As a result of the sharp decline in annual carloads between 1995 and 2000, Gulf & Ohio sought to abandon the line. Instead, G&O and Coahoma County reached an agreement whereby the latter would purchase the railroad—including the leased portion from Illinois Central—and the former would continue to serve the line until a new long term operator could be found. Gulf & Ohio continued service until June 30, 2001 after which C&J Railroad Company began operation of the railroad.

== Rock Island (2019–2025) ==
During the spring of 2019, a new operator, Chicago Rock Island & Pacific Railroad LLC began operation of the line. Currently the railroad still operates from a connection with the Canadian National at Swan Lake, with PVC, polystyrene, plastics, paper, corn, cottonseed products, propane, and rubber constituting the majority of the 5,500 annual carloads over the line.

In November 2024, Coahoma County requested lease proposals for the Mississippi Delta Railroad. The highest bidder was American Services Rail (ASR). In March 2025, ASR filed a verified notice with the Surface Transportation Board to take over operations on Mississippi Delta Railroad.

In April 2025 Rock Island ceased operations on Mississippi Delta Railroad and the railroad isn’t currently being used. Rock Island’s Units are being relocated elsewhere.

== Tourist trains ==
In March 2011, plans emerged to create a new tourist excursion train over part of the Mississippi Delta mainline between Clarksdale and Hopson Commissary, approximately 2 mi (3.2 km) south of downtown Clarksdale. Although regular passenger train service over the railroad does not currently exist, the Mississippi Delta Railroad has hosted special trains during Clarksdale's annual blues festival to Hopson. These trains followed the route to Hopson Commissary that would be used in the planned regular tourist service.
