= Juniata Terminal Company =

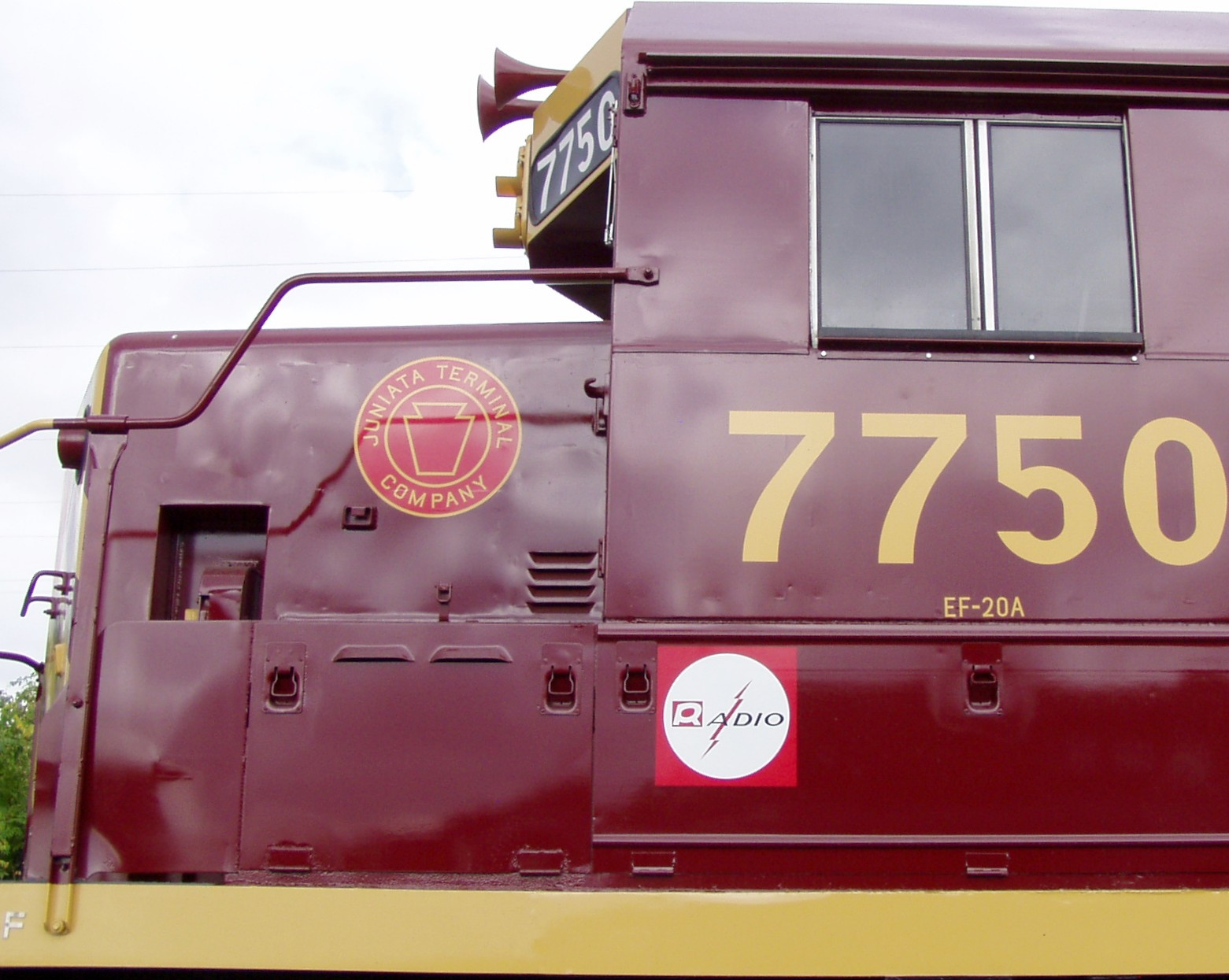
One of the Juniata Terminal locomotives

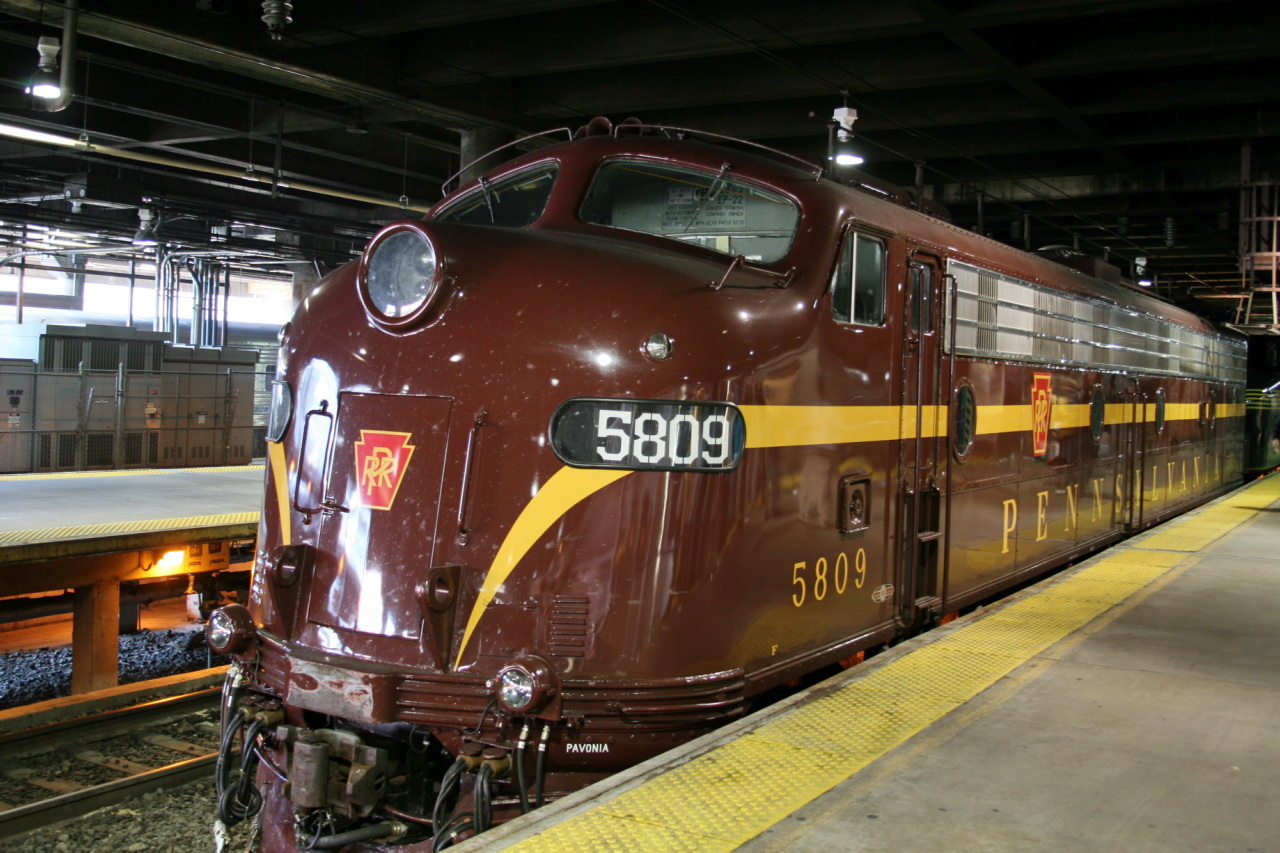
Pennsylvania Railroad, EMD E8, #5809

Juniata Terminal Co. is a locomotive leasing and railcar storage company. The company takes its name from the facility in Philadelphia from which it operates.

== Overview ==
The company owns a number of restored diesel locomotives, including a pair of former Conrail EMD E8s which have been meticulously overhauled and painted in the Pennsylvania Railroad wide-stripe paint scheme. These two units often pull the company's private passenger cars, and can be seen on special excursions with Amtrak equipment. As of 2019, these units are not in operation due to a decision by the owner not to retrofit them with positive train control (PTC). Traffic on most Class I railroad main lines were required to be equipped with PTC by 2019 in accordance with the Rail Safety Improvement Act of 2008.

== History ==
The three-track Juniata Terminal facility was built in 1928 by the Pennsylvania Railroad as the Philadelphia L-C-L less-than-carload freight terminal.
