= Midland Railway (Kansas) =

Heritage railway in Kansas, United States

Coordinates: 38°46′29″N 95°12′03″W

- Baldwin City & Southern Railroad (BC&SR); Leavenworth, Lawrence and Galveston Railroad
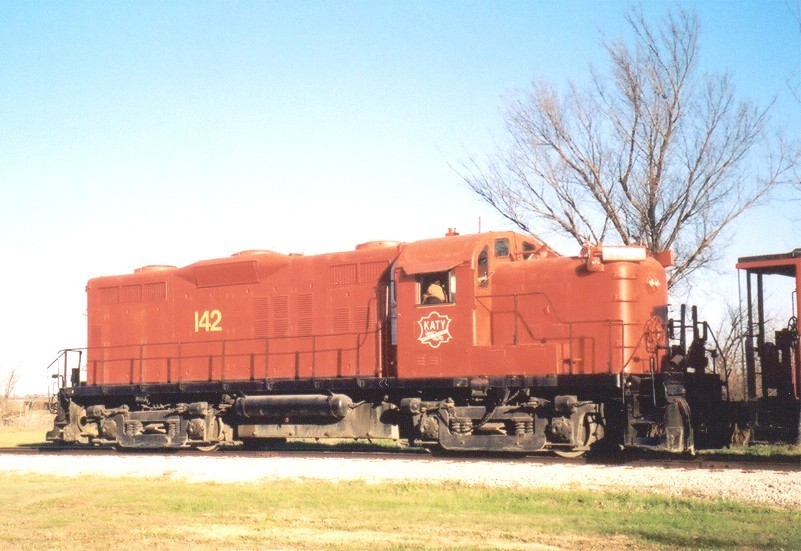
- Ex-MKT #142, an RS3m

Overview
- Headquarters: Baldwin City, Kansas
- Reporting mark: LLG (for Class III subsidiary Baldwin City & Southern Railroad)
- Locale: Douglas and Franklin counties, Kansas, United States
- Dates of operation: 1987–2023
- Predecessor: Atchison, Topeka and Santa Fe Railway (AT&SF)
- Successor: Ottawa Northern Railroad

Technical
- Track gauge: 4 ft 8 1/2 in (1,435 mm) standard gauge
- Length: 11 miles (18 km)

The Midland Railway was a heritage railroad operating a short line in Franklin County and Douglas County in Kansas between Ottawa, Kansas and Baldwin City, Kansas.

It was chartered in 1982 to find an abandoned railroad line to operate. Midland purchased the line from Baldwin City to Ottawa from the Atchison, Topeka and Santa Fe Railway (AT&SF) in 1987, and began running excursion trains on part of the line later that year. Total length of the line is 11 miles (18 km).

Midland operated a demonstration historic railroad, and its mission was to "educate the public about the role railroading played, and continues to play, in the commercial, social, and cultural life of America's Heartland." Midland's base of operations was the depot built in 1906 by the AT&SF at 1515 High Street in Baldwin City. This building was added to the National Register of Historic Places listings in Douglas County, Kansas in 1983. Midland had received two matching federal grants to rebuild track. Private grants were used to rebuild railroad equipment. Starting in 2004, excursion trains were run all the way from Baldwin City to Ottawa.

The regular operating season ran from Memorial Day (last Monday of May) to October 31 (Halloween). Special events and fairs were held at various times through the year. Weekend Boy Scout camps were held in the spring and fall. Midland's Scout program was one of the few in the country to offer the Railroading merit badge.

== History ==
=== Baldwin City & Southern Railroad ===
In 2019, the Midland Railway created a wholly owned, for-profit subsidiary called the Leavenworth, Lawrence and Galveston Railroad, but doing business as the Baldwin City & Southern Railroad (BC&SR). The original plan was for the BC&SR to take over all active railroad operations, while Midland would focus on public education and historic preservation. In November 2019 the BC&SR was awarded a $750,000 Kansas Department of Commerce grant to help with operational costs to transition from the all-volunteer model under which Midland operated, to an employee-based model, with a grant requirement to have at least 22 employees. However, the BC&SR service was discontinued in March 2020 following a rent dispute with the operator of Baldwin City's historic train depot.

=== Kansas Belle Dinner Train ===
The Kansas Belle Dinner Train was a dinner train which also operated out of the Baldwin City depot. It utilized Midland Railway's track and locomotives but was separately owned. The train suspended services on March 14, 2020 due to the COVID-19 pandemic. After waiting four years for operations to resume, the train set was sold in autumn of 2024.

=== Midland Railroad ===
An entity called Midland Railroad LLC filed notice with the Surface Transportation Board on September 15, 2022 that it was acquiring this rail line, and intended to replace the Leavenworth, Lawrence & Galveston Railroad d/b/a the Baldwin City & Southern Railroad as the common carrier service provider over said line. However, this transaction was never completed.

=== Ottawa Northern Railroad ===
On March 9, 2023, the Ottawa Northern Railroad, a subsidiary of the Chicago, Rock Island and Pacific Railroad, filed notice with the Surface Transportation Board that it was acquiring the line, and replacing the Leavenworth, Lawrence & Galveston Railroad, doing business as the Baldwin City & Southern Railroad Company as the common carrier service provider on it. The notice indicated in part that there were currently no customers on the line, and accordingly, no shippers to notify. As of April 2024, the Ottawa Northern Railroad indicates on its website that it completed the acquisition, and that plans are in the works to bring back the excursion trains.

== Locomotive fleet ==
Locomotive	Build date	Builder	Model	Purchased	Condition	Notes
142	June 1951	ALCO	RS-3m	2023	Operational	
LTEX 310	August 1985	EMD	F40PHR	2023	Operational	
460	December 26, 1942	GE	44-ton	2023	Stored	
BNSF 2756	October 1962	EMD	GP39E	-	Operational	
4079	April 1962	EMD	GP20	2023	Operational	
RILX 4613	January 1962	EMD	GP10	2025	Operational	

== See also ==
- List of heritage railroads in the United States
- List of Kansas railroads
