= Baldwin City, Kansas =

- City
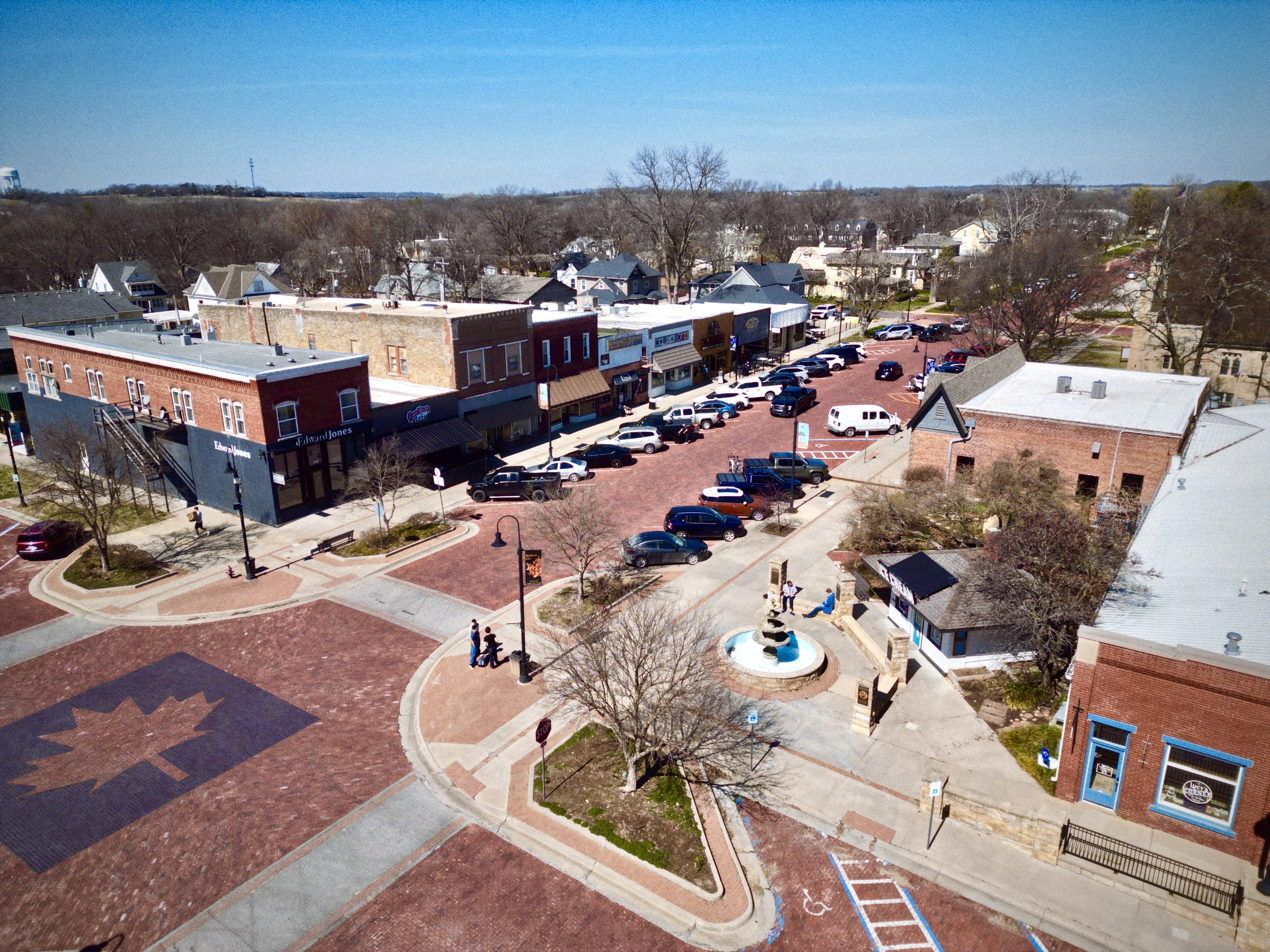
- Downtown Baldwin City (2026)

- Flag Logo

- Location within Douglas County and Kansas

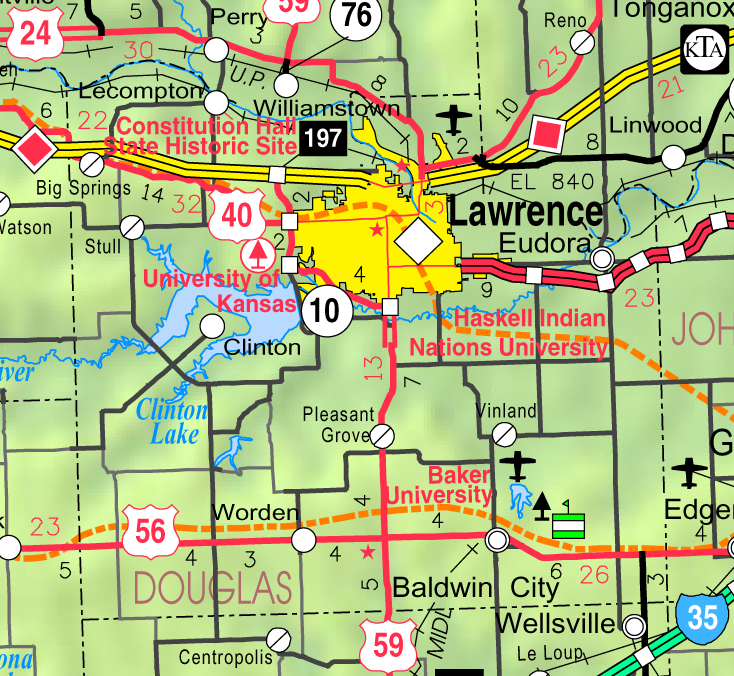
- KDOT map of Douglas County (legend)
- Coordinates: 38°46′41″N 95°11′17″W
- Country: United States
- State: Kansas
- County: Douglas
- Township: Palmyra
- Founded: 1850s
- Incorporated: 1870
- Named for: John Baldwin

Government
  - Mayor: Gerald Cullumber

Area
  - Total: 2.69 sq mi (6.96 km^{2})
  - Land: 2.67 sq mi (6.92 km^{2})
  - Water: 0.015 sq mi (0.04 km^{2})
- Elevation: 1,066 ft (325 m)

Population (2020)
  - Total: 4,826
  - Density: 1,810/sq mi (697/km^{2})
- Time zone: UTC-6 (CST)
  - Summer (DST): UTC-5 (CDT)
- ZIP Code: 66006
- Area code: 785
- FIPS code: 20-03900
- GNIS ID: 2394055
- Website: baldwincity.gov

Baldwin City is a city in Palmyra Township, Douglas County, Kansas, United States, about 12 miles (19 km) south of Lawrence. As of the 2020 census, the population of the city was 4,826. The city is home to Baker University, the state's oldest four-year university.

== History ==
=== Early history ===
Baldwin City began as a trail stop on the Santa Fe Trail named Palmyra. The small community consisted of a harness shop, blacksmith, hotel, lawyer, drug store, two doctors and a tavern. In 1858, a group of Methodist ministers gathered at Kibbee Cabin and founded Baker University. Palmyra bought land to the south for the university and surrounding city. The first post office was established in June, 1857.

A main benefactor of the community was John Baldwin and the town was named in his honor. Baldwin built a saw mill which was at present-day Fifth and Indiana Streets. Baldwin City was incorporated on September 22, 1870.

Baldwin City unwittingly found themselves surrounded by the events that led up to the American Civil War. Three miles east of Baldwin was the town site of Black Jack where the Battle of Black Jack took place on June 2, 1856. The night before that battle, John Brown stayed in Prairie City. In 1863, Quantrill's raiders passed within three miles (5 km) of Baldwin after the burning of Lawrence.

=== Midland Railway ===
In 1867, the Leavenworth, Lawrence and Galveston Railroad laid tracks and became the first Kansas railroad south of the Kansas River. In 1906, the Santa Fe Depot was built and in more modern times, the Midland Railway offered over 20-mile round trip excursion rides to Ottawa via "Nowhere" and Norwood. Midland's Scout program is one of the few in the country to offer a railroading merit badge and Midland has hosted a Thomas the Tank Engine attraction the last few years. Currently, that railroad has been replaced by the Ottawa Northern Railroad, which plans to resume the tourist trains.

=== Maple Leaf Festival ===
Every year since 1957, Baldwin City has hosted the Maple Leaf Festival during the third full weekend in October. It began as a way to celebrate a successful harvest and to view the fall foliage. Today, it is the largest fall family event in the area and features a parade, arts and crafts, quilt show, theatrical performances, history tours, train rides and live music. Annually it draws crowds of 30,000 or more.

== Geography ==
According to the United States Census Bureau, the city has an area of 2.64 square miles (6.84 km^{2}), of which 2.62 square miles (6.79 km^{2}) is land and 0.02 square miles (0.05 km^{2}) is water.

=== Climate ===
The area's climate is characterized by hot, humid summers and generally cool to cold winters. According to the Köppen Climate Classification system, Baldwin City has a humid subtropical climate, abbreviated "Cfa" on climate maps.

== Demographics ==
Historical population
Census	Pop.	Note	%±
1880	325		—
1890	935		187.7%
1900	1,017		8.8%
1910	1,386		36.3%
1920	1,137		−18.0%
1930	1,127		−0.9%
1940	1,096		−2.8%
1950	1,741		58.9%
1960	1,877		7.8%
1970	2,520		34.3%
1980	2,829		12.3%
1990	2,961		4.7%
2000	3,400		14.8%
2010	4,515		32.8%
2020	4,826		6.9%
U.S. Decennial Census

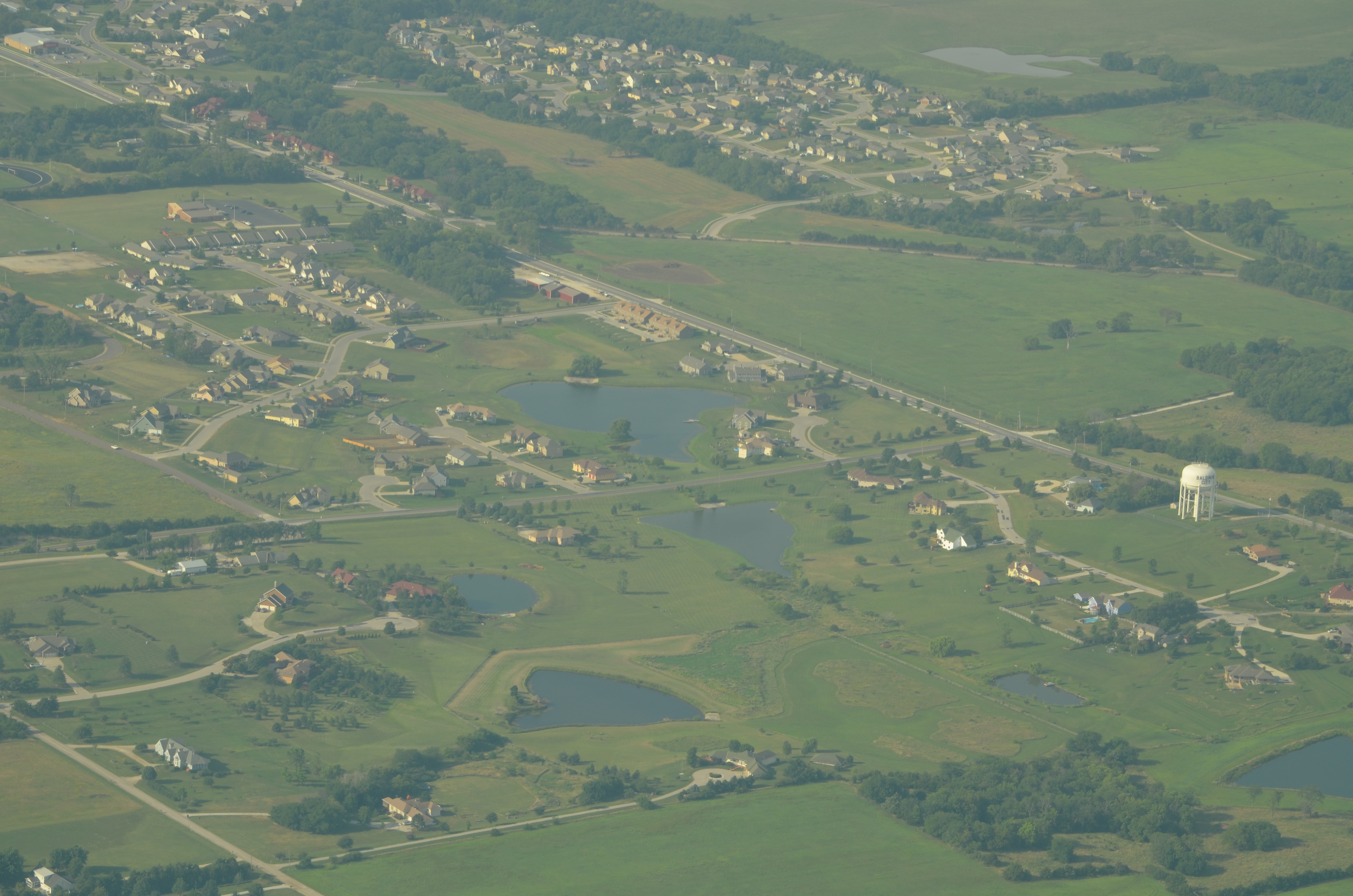
Aerial View of Baldwin City

Baldwin City is part of the Lawrence Metropolitan Statistical Area.

=== 2020 census ===
As of the 2020 census, Baldwin City had a population of 4,826, with 1,651 households and 1,085 families. The population density was 1,802.8 inhabitants per square mile (696.0/km^{2}). There were 1,748 housing units at an average density of 653.0 per square mile (252.1/km^{2}).

The median age was 31.5 years. 22.2% of residents were under the age of 18, 20.7% were from 18 to 24, 20.0% were from 25 to 44, 21.2% were from 45 to 64, and 15.9% were 65 years of age or older. For every 100 females there were 96.0 males, and for every 100 females age 18 and over there were 93.7 males age 18 and over.

0.0% of residents lived in urban areas, while 100.0% lived in rural areas.

There were 1,651 households in Baldwin City, of which 34.5% had children under the age of 18 living in them. Of all households, 48.6% were married-couple households, 19.0% were households with a male householder and no spouse or partner present, and 25.9% were households with a female householder and no spouse or partner present. About 28.7% of all households were made up of individuals and 14.5% had someone living alone who was 65 years of age or older.

There were 1,748 housing units, of which 5.5% were vacant. The homeowner vacancy rate was 0.7% and the rental vacancy rate was 5.1%.

Racial composition as of the 2020 census
Race	Number	Percent
White	4,230	87.7%
Black or African American	96	2.0%
American Indian and Alaska Native	47	1.0%
Asian	35	0.7%
Native Hawaiian and Other Pacific Islander	6	0.1%
Some other race	79	1.6%
Two or more races	333	6.9%
Hispanic or Latino (of any race)	209	4.3%

Non-Hispanic White residents comprised 85.81% (4,141) of the population.

=== Demographic estimates ===
The average household size was 2.7 and the average family size was 3.2. The percent of those with a bachelor's degree or higher was estimated to be 23.5% of the population.

=== Income and poverty ===
The 2016–2020 5-year American Community Survey estimates show that the median household income was $74,074 (with a margin of error of +/- $7,962) and the median family income was $76,346 (+/- $17,265). Males had a median income of $34,583 (+/- $20,308) versus $16,000 (+/- $10,190) for females. The median income for those above 16 years old was $23,188 (+/- $12,766). Approximately, 4.4% of families and 7.9% of the population were below the poverty line, including 10.8% of those under the age of 18 and 6.2% of those ages 65 or over.

=== 2010 census ===
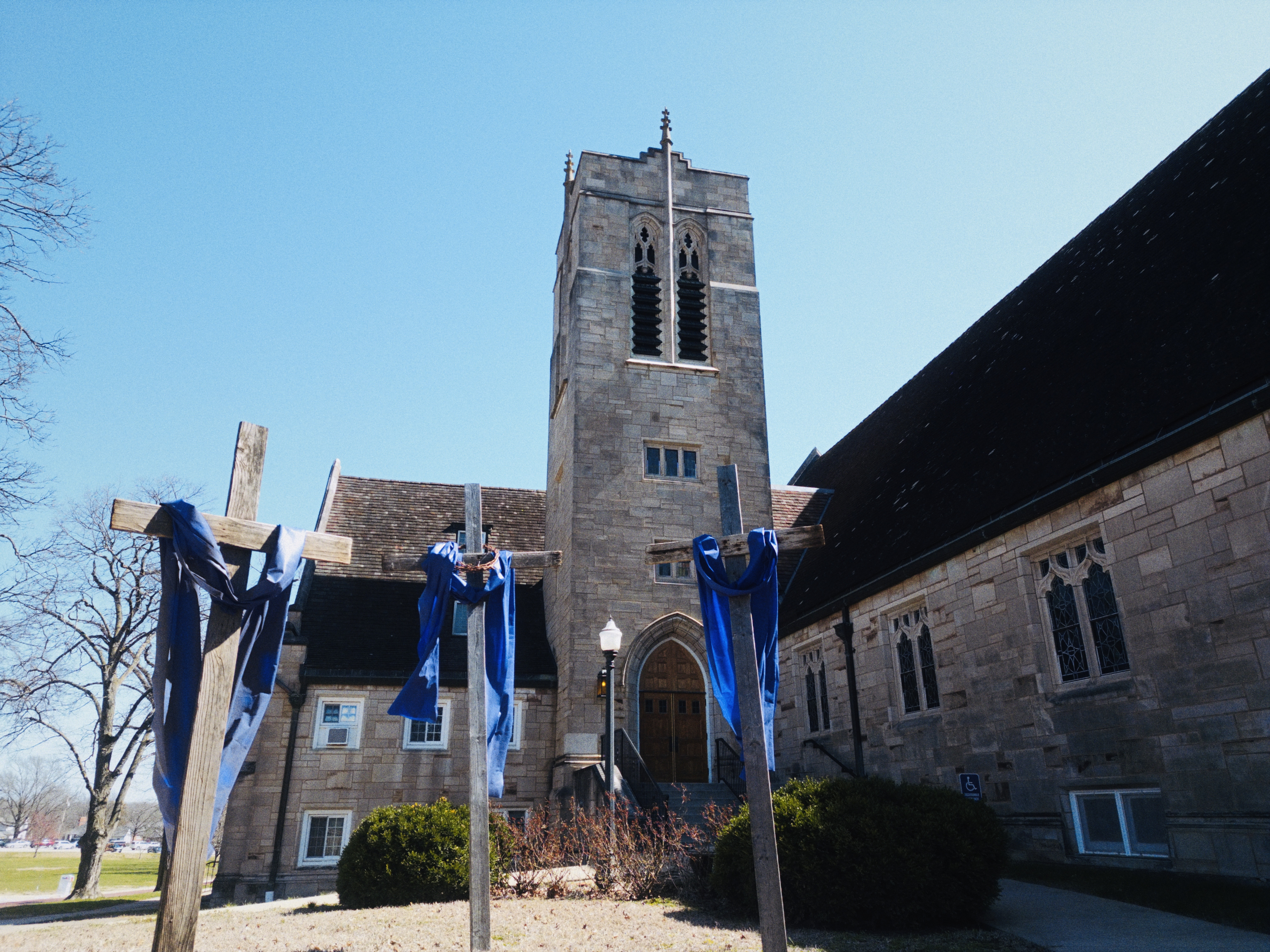
The United Methodist Church in Baldwin City Kansas

As of the census of 2010, there were 4,515 people, 1,501 households, and 1,011 families living in the city. The population density was 1,723.3 inhabitants per square mile (665.4/km^{2}). There were 1,665 housing units at an average density of 635.5 per square mile (245.4/km^{2}). The racial makeup of the city was 93.4% White, 2.1% African American, 0.7% Native American, 0.5% Asian, 0.6% from other races, and 2.7% from two or more races. Hispanic or Latino of any race were 3.0% of the population.

There were 1,501 households, of which 37.5% had children under the age of 18 living with them, 52.6% were married couples living together, 10.2% had a female householder with no husband present, 4.5% had a male householder with no wife present, and 32.6% were non-families. 26.8% of all households were made up of individuals, and 12.1% had someone living alone who was 65 years of age or older. The average household size was 2.54 and the average family size was 3.08.

The median age in the city was 30.2 years. 24.3% of residents were under the age of 18; 20.9% were between the ages of 18 and 24; 22.9% were from 25 to 44; 20.1% were from 45 to 64; and 11.9% were 65 years of age or older. The gender makeup of the city was 48.5% male and 51.5% female.

== Government ==
The Baldwin City government consists of a mayor and five council members. The council meets the first and third Tuesdays of each month at 7:00pm.

== Education ==
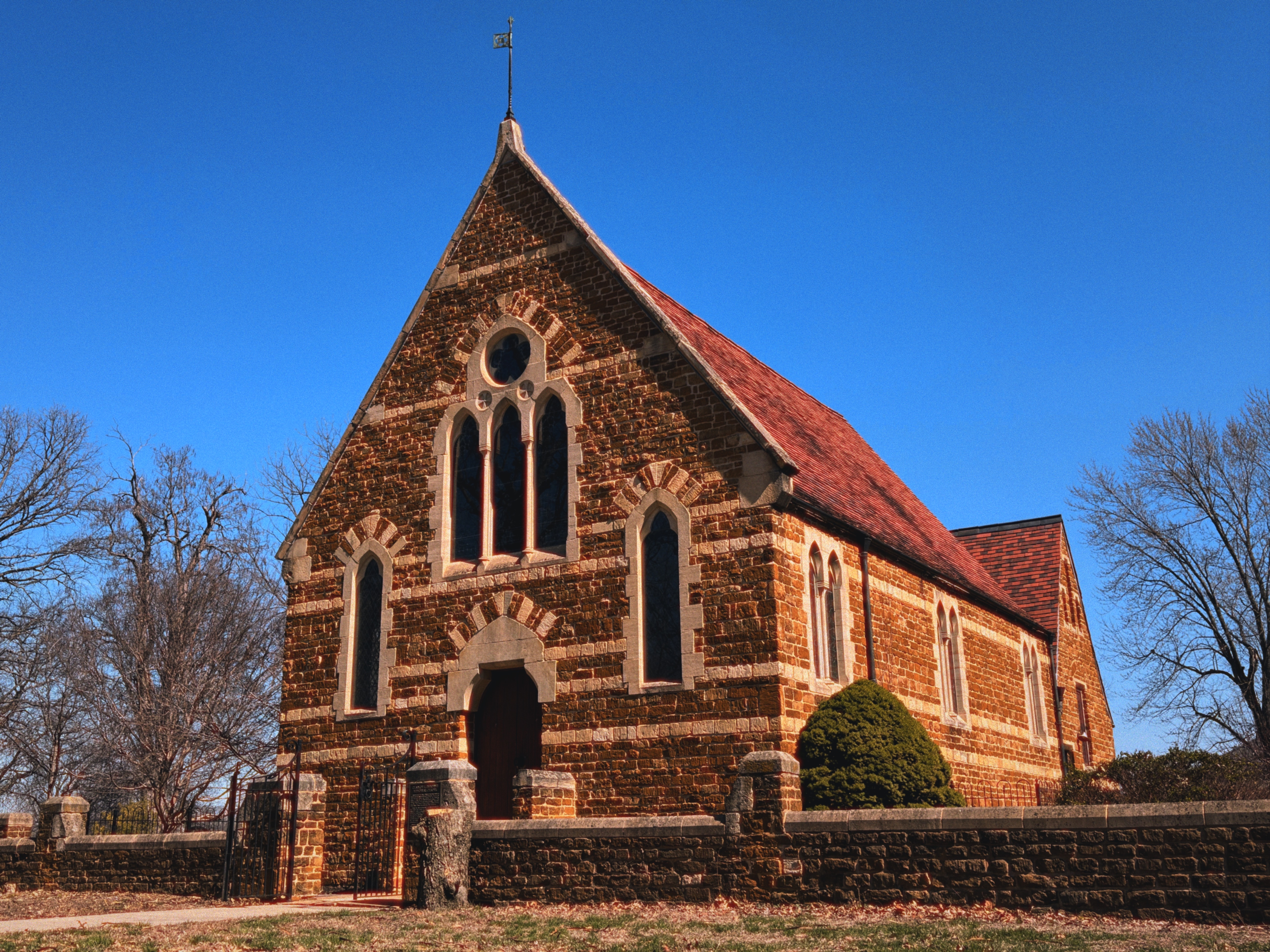
A chapel on the campus of Baker University

=== Primary and secondary education ===
The community is served by Baldwin City USD 348 public school district, and serves most of southern Douglas County. It maintains four schools in Baldwin City (Baldwin Elementary, Baldwin Intermediate, Baldwin Junior High and Baldwin High School). On December 13, 2010, the USD 348 Board of Education voted to close the schools in Vinland and Worden at the end of the 2010–2011 school year.

- Baldwin High School is home to the Bulldogs.

Closed schools

- Vinland Elementary - closed in 2011
- Marion Springs Elementary - closed in 2011

=== College ===
Baldwin City is home to the main campus of Baker University, a liberal arts university founded in 1858 by United Methodist ministers. It is the oldest four-year university in Kansas and has been coed since it was founded.

== Notable people ==
- Delia L. Weatherby (1843–1916), temperance reformer and author.

== Gallery ==
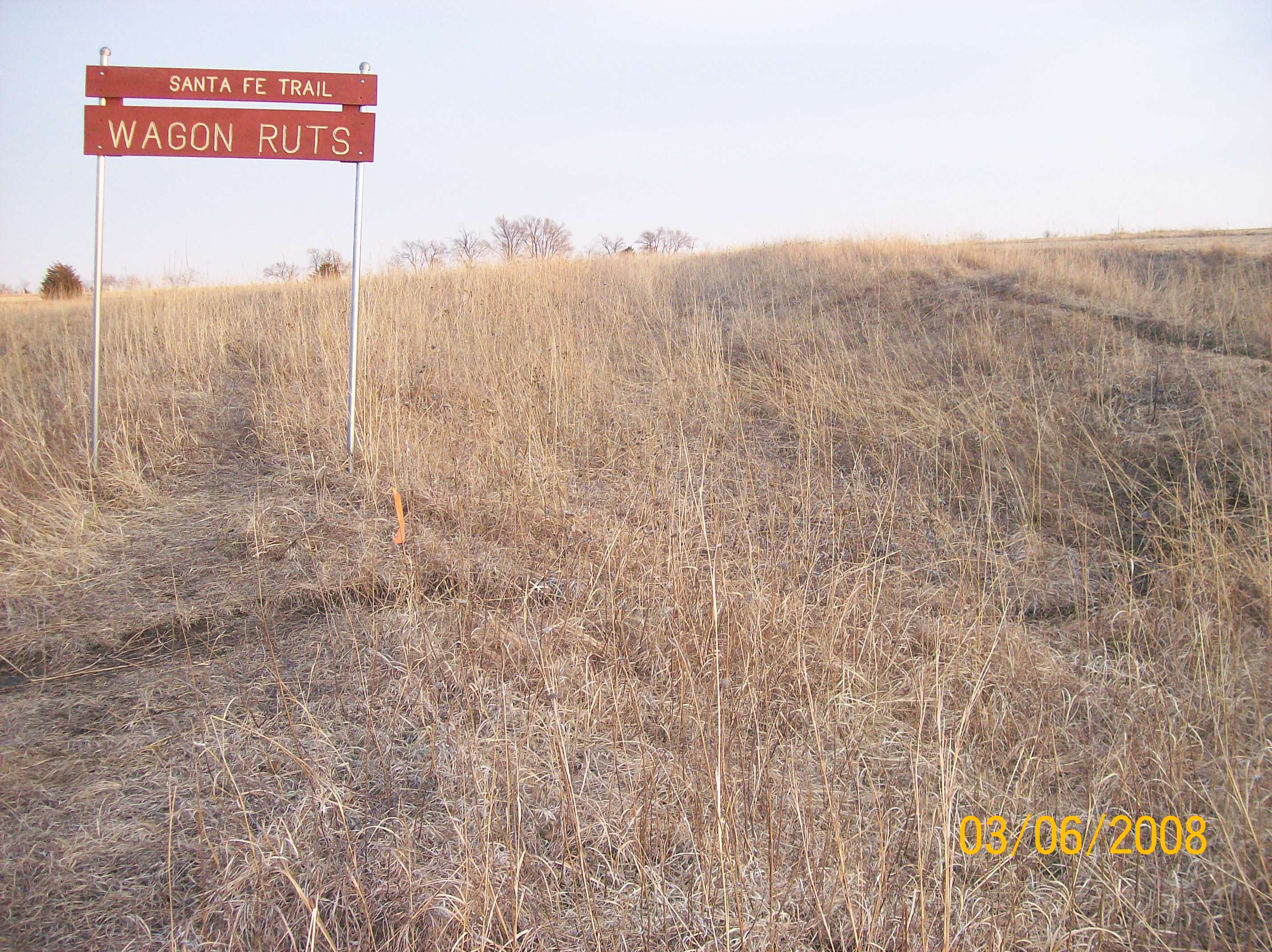
To the right of the sign are remnants of wagon ruts left from the Santa Fe Trail in the Ivan Boyd Prairie Preserve near Baldwin City. Also was the site of Black Jack.

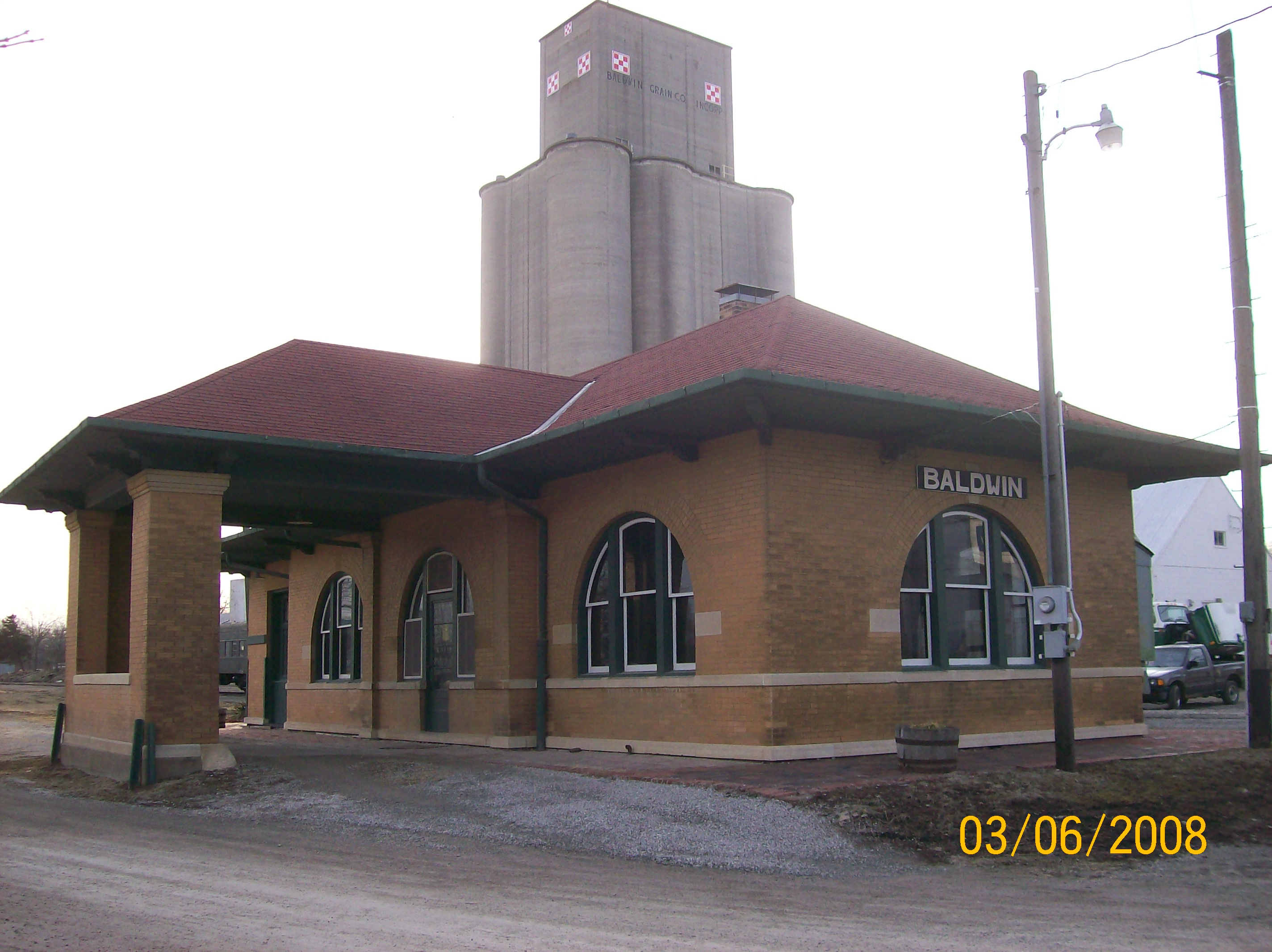
The Santa Fe Depot for the Midland Railway in west Baldwin City.
