= Ottawa Northern Railroad =

Overview
- Parent company: Chicago, Rock Island and Pacific Railroad
- Headquarters: Baldwin City, Kansas
- Reporting mark: ON
- Locale: Douglas and Franklin counties, Kansas, United States
- Dates of operation: 2023–present
- Predecessor: Midland Railway

Technical
- Track gauge: 4 ft 8 1/2 in (1,435 mm) standard gauge
- Length: 17 miles (27 km)

Other
- Website: ottawanorthernrailroad.com (excursion service)

The Ottawa Northern Railroad (ONR, reporting mark ON) is a class III shortline railroad and excursion railroad based in Kansas. It operates 17 miles (27 kilometres) of track running north from Ottawa, Kansas.

As a subsidiary of the Chicago, Rock Island and Pacific Railroad, it primarily serves the region by interchanging freight with the Burlington Northern and Santa Fe Railway (BNSF) Transcontinental.

== History ==
On March 9, 2023, the Ottawa Northern Railroad filed notice with the Surface Transportation Board that it was acquiring the line, and replacing the Leavenworth, Lawrence and Galveston Railroad (LLGR), doing business as the Baldwin City and Southern Railroad Company (BCSR) as the common carrier service provider on it.

The notice indicated in part that there were currently no customers on the line, and accordingly, no shippers to notify. As of April 2024, the Ottawa Northern Railroad indicates on its website that it completed the acquisition, and that plans are in the works to bring back the excursion trains.

== Locomotive fleet ==
Locomotive	Build date	Builder	Model	Purchased	Condition	Notes
MKT 142	June 1951	ALCO	RS-3m	2023	Operational	
LTEX 310	August 1985	EMD	F40PHR	2023	Operational	
BUGX 401	February 1953	EMD	F7	2024	Stored	
BUGX 402	December 1949	EMD	F7	2024	Stored	
SPTX 4079	April 1962	EMD	GP20	2023	Operational	
RILX 4613	January 1962	EMD	GP10	2025	Operational	
