= Union Station (Ogden, Utah) =

Train station in Ogden, Utah, United States

Ogden Union Station
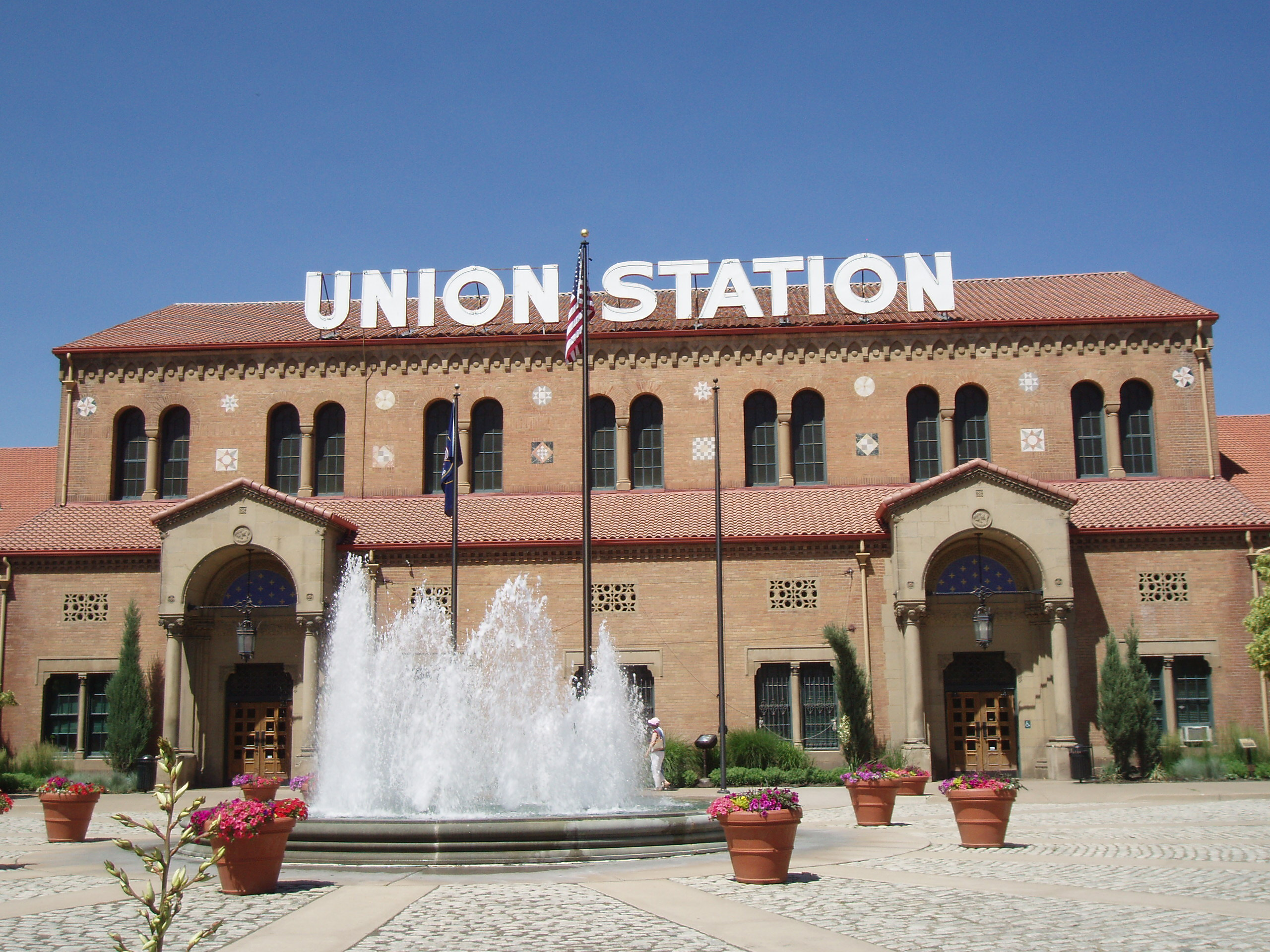
- Station building, reconstructed in 1924 after the fire, June 2008

General information
- Location: 2501 South Wall Avenue; Ogden, Utah; United States
- Coordinates: 41°13′15″N 111°58′47″W
- System: Former Union Pacific Railroad, Southern Pacific Railroad, Denver and Rio Grande Western Railroad, and Amtrak station
- Owner: City of Ogden
- Operator: Amtrak (former) Ogden Union Railway & Depot Co. (former)
- Line: Multiple
- Platforms: 1 island and 1 side platform
- Tracks: Utah State Railroad Museum

Construction
- Parking: Yes
- Accessible: Yes

Other information
- Status: Railway Museum and Community Center
- Station code: OGD

History
- Opened: 1869
- Closed: May 10, 1997
- Rebuilt: 1889; 1924

Former services
Preceding station	Amtrak	Following station
Pocatello 1988–1997 toward Seattle	Pioneer	Evanston 1991–1997 toward Chicago
Cache Junction 1982–1988 toward Seattle	Pioneer	Salt Lake City (D&RGW Depot) 1986–1991 toward Chicago
Brigham City 1977–1981 toward Seattle	Pioneer	Salt Lake City (UP Depot) 1977–1986 Terminus
Elko toward Oakland	San Francisco Zephyr Until 1983	Evanston toward Chicago
Salt Lake City (UP Depot) toward Los Angeles	Desert Wind Until 1983	Evanston toward Chicago
Preceding station	Denver and Rio Grande Western Railroad	Following station
Terminus	Moffat Tunnel Route	Roy toward Denver
Terminus	Royal Gorge Route	Roy toward Denver
Preceding station	Southern Pacific Railroad	Following station
Promontory Point toward Oakland Pier	Overland Route	through to Union Pacific
Preceding station	Union Pacific Railroad	Following station
through to Southern Pacific	Overland Route	Uintah toward Council Bluffs Transfer
Harrisville toward Butte	Butte – Salt Lake City	Roy toward Salt Lake City
- Ogden Union Depot
- U.S. National Register of Historic Places
- Built: 1924
- Architect: John Parkinson and Donald B. Parkinson
- Architectural style: Spanish Colonial Revival
- NRHP reference No.: 71000867; 05000363 (boundary increase)
- Added to NRHP: April 11, 1971
Location
- Location within Utah Location within the United States

Union Station, also known as Ogden Union Station, is a train station in Ogden, Utah, United States, at the west end of Historic 25th Street, just south of Ogden Central station (previously known as the Ogden Intermodal Transit Center). Formerly the junction of the Union Pacific (UP) and Central Pacific (CP) railroads, its name reflects the common appellation of train stations whose tracks and facilities are shared by railway companies.

No longer a railway hub, the building remains a cultural hub: it houses the Utah State Railroad Museum, the Spencer S. Eccles Rail Center, the John M. Browning Firearms Museum, Utah Cowboy and Western Heritage Museum and the Browning-Kimball Classic Car Museum, and an art gallery for local and regional artists. The Myra Powell Gallery features traveling exhibits and the station's permanent art collection. Union Station Research Library has an extensive collection of historic Ogden photographs and documents available to the public.

The last long-distance passenger train to use Union Station was Amtrak's Pioneer in May 1997. The adjacent Ogden Central station serves the Utah Transit Authority's (UTA) FrontRunner commuter rail line and Ogden Express bus rapid transit line.

In December 2022, Ogden City entered into a purchase agreement with UP to buy the land under and around the station for $5.5 million (equivalent to $6.84 million in 2025). They plan to pursue development of the area around the station into a downtown business and tourist hub, as well as potentially bring rail service back to the station itself.

== History ==
=== The need for a "Junction City" ===
On March 8, 1869, the UP laid tracks through Ogden on its way to Promontory Summit, where it would meet the CP and complete the First transcontinental railroad across the United States. Despite the famous Golden spike ceremony that marked the completion of the rail line, both railroad companies knew that Promontory was too remote of a location to house the important junction point between their respective operations, and the decision was made to build the depot farther east down the line towards the larger populated cities of north-central Utah. Three cities near this location - Corinne, Uintah, and Ogden - competed with each other for the opportunity to house the facilities that they knew would serve as a major transit hub for cross-country travelers, who would have to transfer trains between the two different railroads. Corinne emerged as an early front-runner for the junction, but The Church of Jesus Christ of Latter-day Saints — whose members made up much of Utah's settler population at this time — did not want their territory to be represented by what was then a Hell on Wheels railroad town full of bars and brothels. In 1874 Brigham Young, the President of the Church, encouraged members to donate or sell parcels of land to him, which he then donated to the railroads on the condition that they build their facilities in west Ogden. This strategy worked, and Ogden became the official junction point between the two halves of the transcontinental railroad.

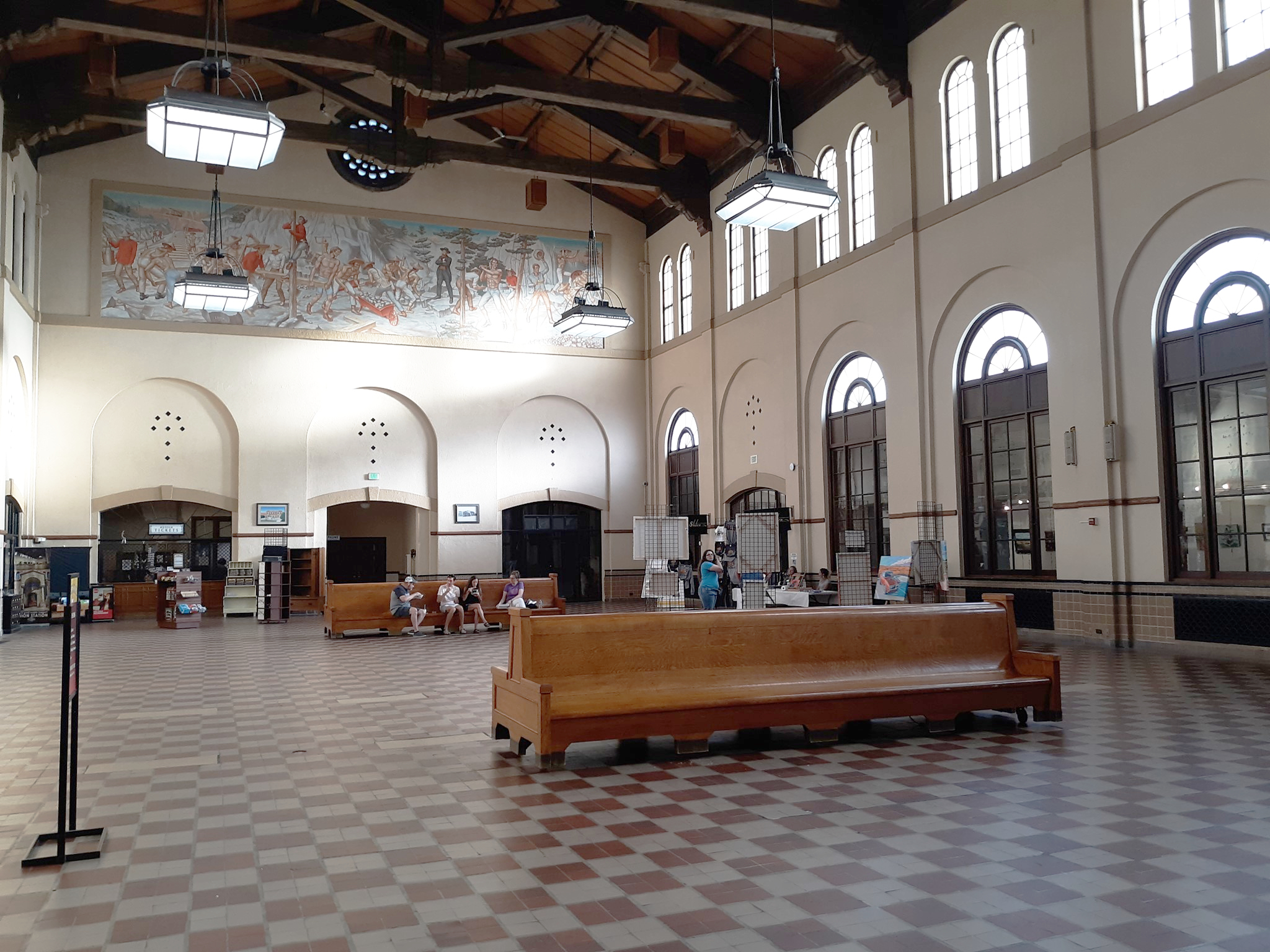
Main Lobby and waiting room, July 2019

While the need for a junction point was clear, the need for a common — or "union" — station shared by both railroads did not emerge until several years later, meaning that each railroad maintained separate station buildings for a time. The first permanent station building in Ogden had been previously completed in November 1869 by the UP. It was a two-story wooden frame building on a mud flat on the banks of the Weber River. After the deal to make Ogden the junction city was struck in 1874, this building was selected for use as a common terminal between the two railroads. In addition to the UP and CP, this station also became the terminal for the Utah Central Railroad that connected with the territorial capital of Salt Lake City to the south, the Utah and Northern Railway which ran into the northern regions of the territory (present-day Idaho), and the Rio Grande Western (RGW) railroad which ran farther to the south before connecting across the mountains to Colorado. This quickly established Ogden as the major transit hub for all of the Intermountain West, as travelers coming from the East or West Coasts could now transfer to trains that would take them to most other populated areas throughout the region. Ogden — and Utah in general — would eventually earn the nickname "Crossroads of the West" for this very reason.

=== The Ogden Union Railway & Depot Company ===
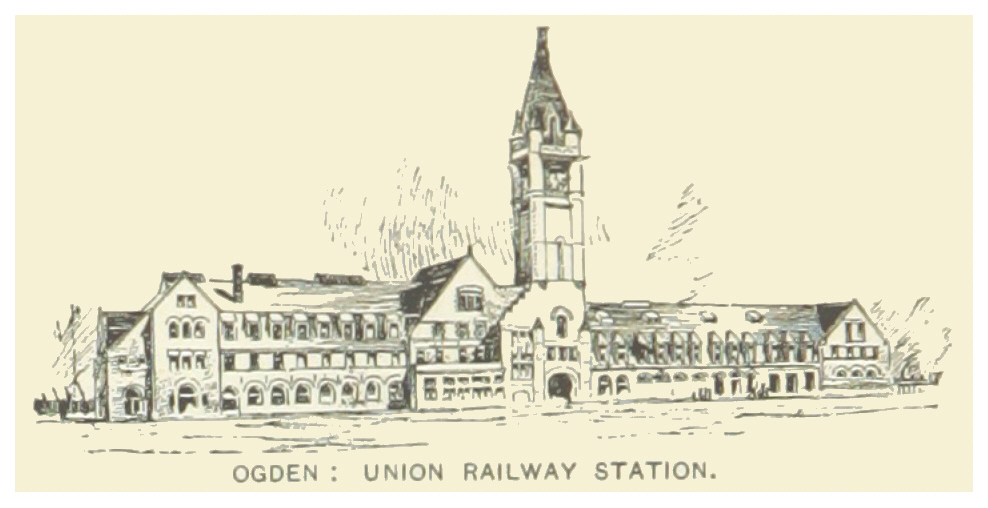
1891 illustration of the first station

This original depot location proved not to be very well-suited for a passenger rail hub. Local newspapers complained about, among other things, the need to walk a quarter-mile of wood boardwalk over swampy ground to reach the station. So the UP and CP launched a jointly owned terminal railroad company, the Ogden Union Railway & Depot Co. (OUR&D), to oversee the construction and operation of a new Union Station. Completed in 1889, this new structure was designed in the Romanesque Revival style, with a large clock tower in the center. Considerably larger than the original station and constructed of brick, it held 33 hotel rooms, a restaurant, barbershop, and other conveniences for travelers. In 1923, a fire that began in a hotel room destroyed the station's interior and left the walls and clock tower in a fragile state. A telephone operator continued to work in the building while it was aflame to warn as many people as possible to evacuate the building. Due to her efforts, no deaths or injuries occurred, and work continued inside the first floor to some extent, but construction on a new building did not start until a stone from the clock tower fell and struck a railroad clerk. He was severely injured, and died on the way to a nearby hospital. Originally, the OUR&D planned to rebuild the station to its original design, but the accident reversed this decision and a new design was proposed by John and Donald Parkinson, architects of the Caliente Depot in Nevada and the Kelso Depot in California.

The construction of the current building was completed in 1924 in the Spanish Colonial Revival (also known as Early Christian/Byzantine) style and is built on the foundation of the earlier building. It was dedicated on November 22 of that year, with a series of publicity shots being taken. One of these shots, showing 13 young women pulling the first train to arrive at the station by ribbons, made its way into the La Domenica del Corriere, an Italian newspaper, with the headline "Curious American Custom". The ceiling of the Grand Lobby, taking up the center portion of the building, has a height of 56 feet (17 m) and extends to the roof. The trusses were originally painted in bright colors with geometric designs, but have since been painted over with a faux wood grain. Murals of the construction of the transcontinental railroad were painted on the north and south end of the lobby. The second floors of the north and south wing were occupied by Southern Pacific (SP), OUR&D, and UP Telegraph Department offices. (The SP had purchased the CP in 1885.)

=== The "Crossroads of the West" ===
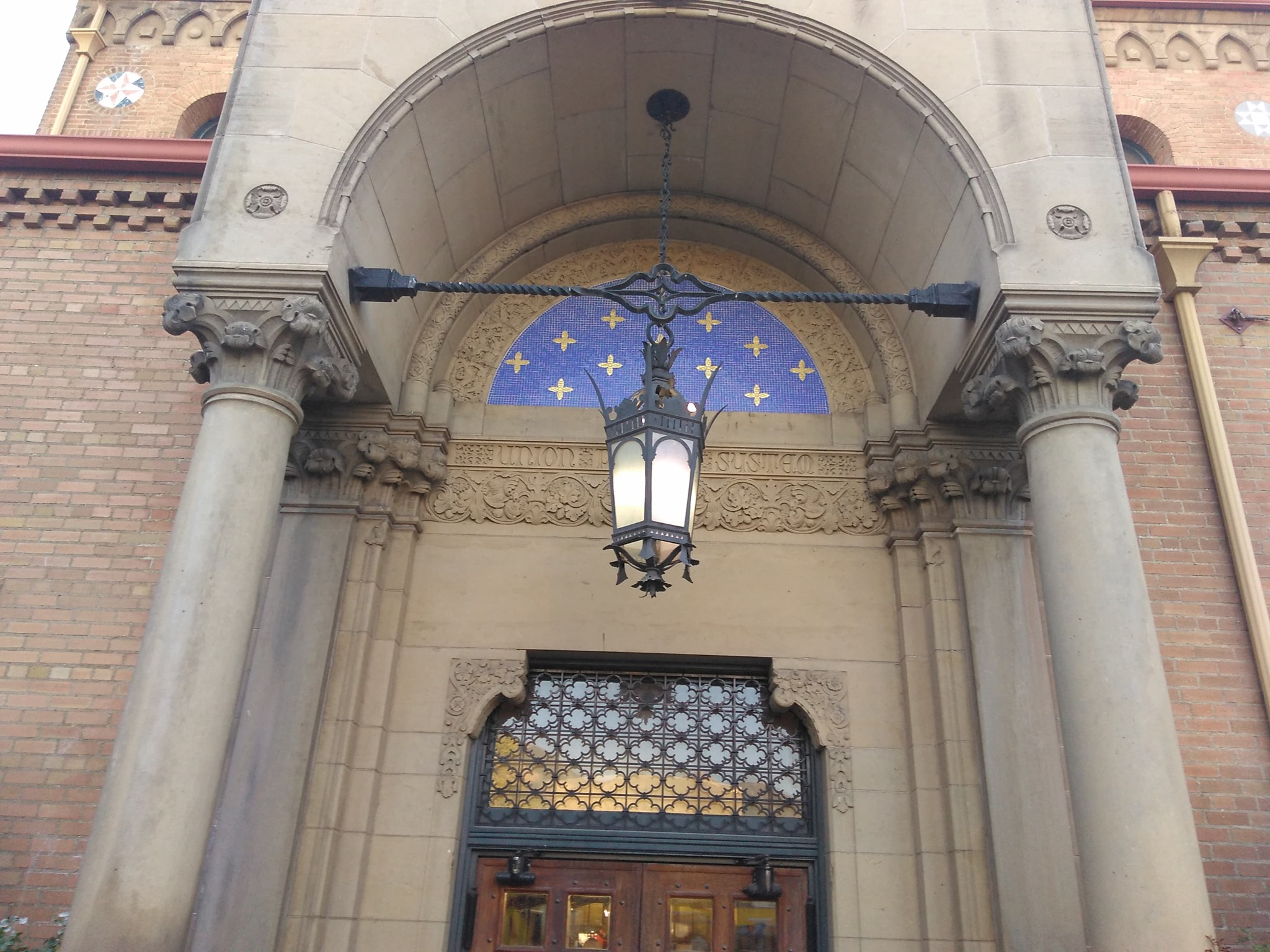
One of the stations two Spanish-style arch entryways, December 2020

By the 1920's, Ogden's Union Station was serving both the UP and SP, as well as the successor to the RGW, the Denver and Rio Grande Western Railroad (D&RGW), and a number of regional and interurban railroads. At its height, it had 13 passenger tracks with platforms, a commissary that provided food and supplies to long-distance trains, a laundry building that washed linens for most of UP's rail network, a large United States Postal Service (USPS) annex that served mail trains, and serviced more than 60 passenger trains each day. It was around this time that the name "Crossroads of the West" began appearing in publications as a way to describe Ogden's significance to the national transportation infrastructure. There was also a memorial plaque commissioned by the Ogden City Council that had Ogden in the center with railroad tracks radiating out from it in all directions (each bearing the name of a railroad company that served the station). It bears the words, "You can't get anywhere without coming to OGDEN," which also served as the city slogan for some time. This memorial is still on display inside the Union Station to this day.

The absolute peak of rail traffic in Ogden came during both World War I (WWI) and World War II (WWII). The city and depot became an important stopover point for soldiers and materials being moved across the country for the war effort, and many new businesses popped up on nearby 25th Street to entertain and support the huge influx of travelers.

=== Decline and preservation ===
Rail traffic began to decline sharply after WWII ended in 1945, owing mainly to the newfound popularity of both the airline industry and increasing accessibility of automobiles for the average traveler and commuter. By 1950, the number of daily passenger trains was down to 20. The construction of the Interstate Highway System continued to pull traffic from both freight and passenger trains into the 1960s.

By the late 1960s passenger train traffic to Ogden had been reduced to just two trains in each direction daily. The USPS had ended its railway post office service, leading to the discontinuation of mail trains by 1967. The OUR&D tore out passenger tracks 6-13, leaving just 5 tracks and three platforms at the once-massive station complex. UP and SP decided to begin curtailing the operations of the OUR&D and re-absorbed much, but not all, of its infrastructure and employees back into their own operations. The commissary was torn down in 1969, marking the end of Ogden as a servicing point for long-distance passenger trains. The station building was now empty for most of the day except for what was described as a handful of OUR&D employees handling daily operations. The final agreement between the OUR&D and a privately owned passenger train service for use of the station was signed in 1971.

On May 1, 1971, most passenger train operations in the United States were taken over by the government-funded National Railroad Passenger Corporation (Amtrak), leaving Ogden with one passenger train in each direction daily. After the Amtrak takeover, it became clear that UP and SP no longer had much interest in the station and could look to sell or demolish it, as they were doing with other defunct stations that they no longer served. Ogden City was keen to save the building, as it had long been the center of economic activity in the community. Ogden had been highly reliant on the railroad industry for almost all of its existence, and the sharp declines in traffic were having major economic impacts on local businesses and residents. Plans to turn the station into a museum were first brought forward during the centennial celebration of the driving of the golden spike in 1969. On December 7, 1971, the Ogden City Council sent a formal letter to the UP asking that the station building be donated to them for conversion to a museum and convention center. Over the next few years, the city began holding events such as art exhibitions inside the building to demonstrate this new planned use. Ownership of the station building was turned over to Ogden City in 1977, as well as a 50-year lease on the land under and around the building itself. Renovations were begun to house the planned museums. Amtrak continued to maintain a ticket agency inside the building and use the station as a stop for their Pioneer trains as well. There was a brief period of time where Amtrak also tried running its California Zephyr and Desert Wind trains through Ogden as well, but they didn't see enough traffic and dropped Ogden from their timetables in 1983

At the dedication ceremony in 1978, UP ran their famous UP 844 (then number 8444) at the head of a special passenger train from Cheyenne, Wyoming, to the new museum. They also donated a steam derrick (built by Industrial Works) and a steam rotary snow plow (built by ALCO in 1912), which were the last pieces of steam-powered equipment in use on the company's system. In 1988, the State of Utah designated Union Station as the Utah State Railroad Museum to handle the railroad artifacts. This spurred a series of donations by the UP through the years, leading to an extensive collection of locomotives and rolling stock being displayed on the station grounds.

=== The end of rail service: present-day Union Station ===
In 1995, UP and SP received permission from the Interstate Commerce Commission to merge their companies, and the OUR&D was finally dissolved sometime shortly after this date. This left UP as the sole operator of the remaining rail facilities that served the station, and owner of the land around the station building.

On May 11, 1997, the final Amtrak Pioneer train departed eastbound from Union Station at 7:38 AM. The route was discontinued after this date, and along with it ended all passenger rail service at Ogden's Union Station. While it has been visited by the occasional excursion train, no revenue passenger service has used the station building or platforms since this date. When the Utah Transit Authority (UTA) constructed their FrontRunner commuter rail service between Ogden and Salt Lake City in 2008, suitable plans to bring rail service back to the station building could not be worked out between the city, UP, and UTA. The decision was made to build a new commuter rail station just to the north of Union Station at the Ogden Intermodal Transit Center (now known as Ogden Central Station). There is currently no direct access for passengers between the FrontRunner station and Union Station.

The 50-year lease on the land under and around the station building was set to expire in 2027. In anticipation of this, UP offered to sell the land outright to Ogden, and in December 2022 the city entered into a purchase agreement with UP for $5.5 million (equivalent to $6.84 million in 2025). Ogden City fully owns both the station and the land that it sits on, and has plans to develop the area.

The station building currently houses the Utah State Railroad Museum, John M. Browning Firearms Museum, The Browning-Kimball Classic Car Museum, the Utah Cowboy and Western Heritage Museum, and a library and archives. It plays host to various conventions and events, including the annual Hostlers Model Railroad Festival, weddings, Ogden Marathon Expo, craft and bridal fairs.

== Features ==
=== OUR&D Tribute ===
Of special note are the two drinking fountains on either end of the Grand Lobby. These fountains, surrounded by colored mosaics, were the favorite resting spot of OUR&D Superintendent Hubert Lloyd Bell. At Bell's passing in 1927 the OUR&D placed a bronze plaque, bearing his likeness, over the fountain on the north end. The plaque reads "In Memory of Hubert Lloyd Bell SUPT. O.U.RY. AND D. Co., 1918–1927, A Just Man, A Friend Who Will Be Remembered".

=== Railway post office/mail terminal annex ===
This building was constructed in 1929 to serve the needs of the USPS, which once ran an extensive railway post office (RPO) service. It is located directly north of the Union Station building. In 1950 a flat-roofed addition was constructed on the east and was used to sort mail. RPO service and mail trains were discontinued in the 1960s, but the USPS continued to use the annex for regular mail service and sorting until the mid-1970's when UP donated the station building to Ogden City. Following the conversion of the station complex to a museum, an addition was constructed in between the station and the annex, connecting the two buildings and allowing year-round indoor access to the facilities in the annex. Currently the Mail Terminal Annex houses the Browning-Kimball Classic Car Museum and the Browning Theatre, which is often rented out for events such as craft fairs, the Ogden Farmers Market, and weddings.

=== Trainmen's building ===
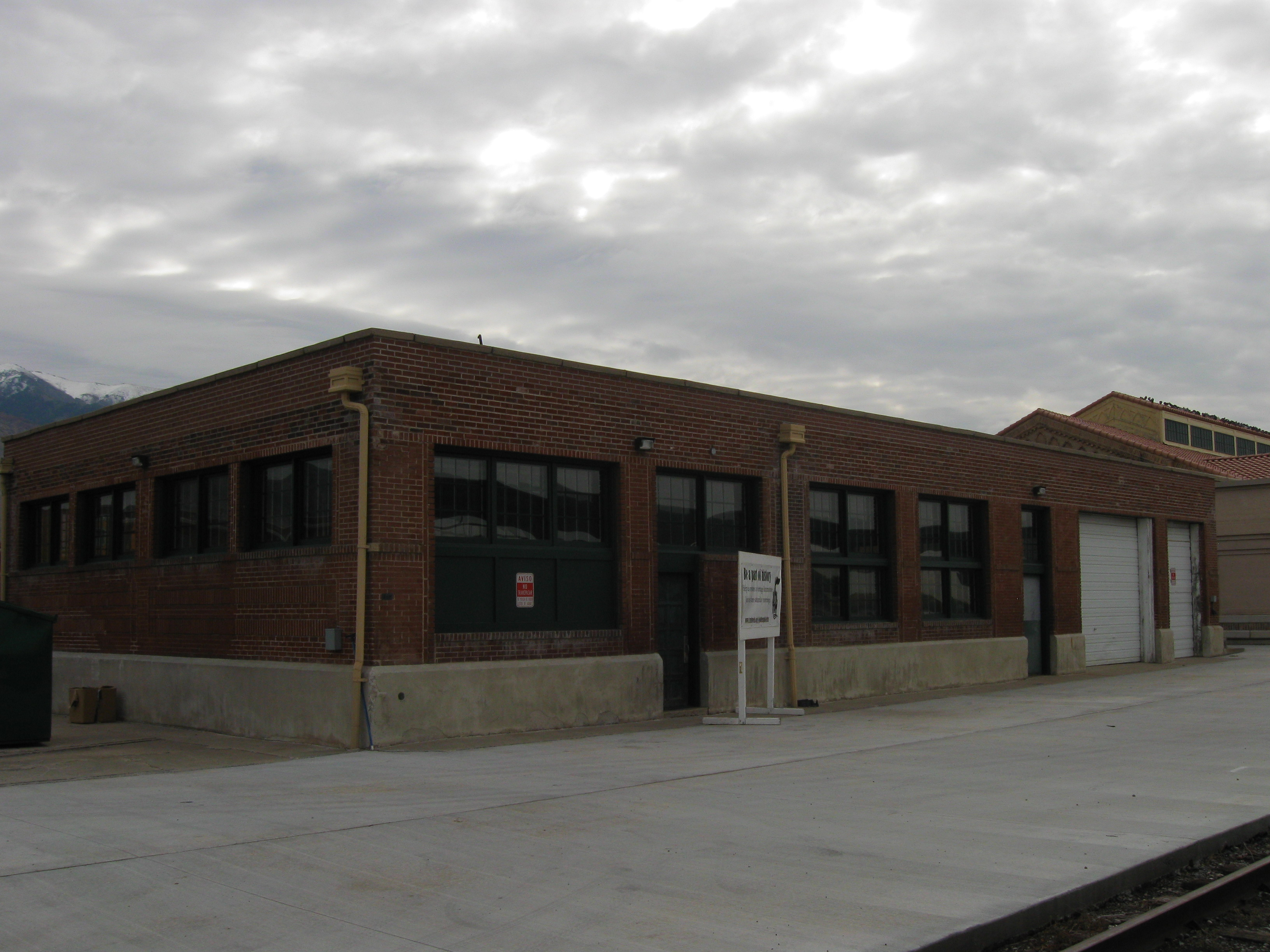
Trainmen's building, January 2009

The Trainmen's Building is the northernmost structure on the Union Station grounds. It was constructed of red brick sometime between 1903 and 1923 and predates the current station building. It served as the RPO (used for sorting mail) until 1929 when the Mail Terminal Annex was constructed to the south, then was used as a crew locker room for the OUR&D. Space in the building was taken up with lockers, a changing room, and a lunchroom.

In 2006, Ogden City installed fluorescent lighting and an alarm system to the building, which up to that time had been vacant. For a time it was used as a shop for the restoration of D&RGW 223, a narrow gauge steam locomotive owned by the State of Utah, by volunteers from the Railway & Locomotive Historical Society (RLHS). However, in 2019 disputes about the locomotive's ownership and restoration practices arose between the volunteers, the State of Utah, and the Ogden City Council, who proceeded to lock out the RLHS from the facility and informed them that they were no longer welcome to continue working at the Union Station. Ogden officials cited safety concerns about the handling of materials as their reason for locking out the volunteers, and also sent a request to the State asking that ownership of the locomotive be transferred to them. The state government did not immediately respond to the request, saying instead that they intend to move the locomotive to a new museum in Salt Lake City where the restoration work could be completed. The locomotive is currently disassembled, with most of the pieces still locked inside the trainmen's building, except for the boiler which sits outside near the passenger platform.

In 2025, it was announced the locomotive would be repatriated to Colorado where with the assistance of the Colorado Railroad Museum, where restoration will be completed and the locomotive will return to operation.

=== Butterfly canopy and passenger platforms ===
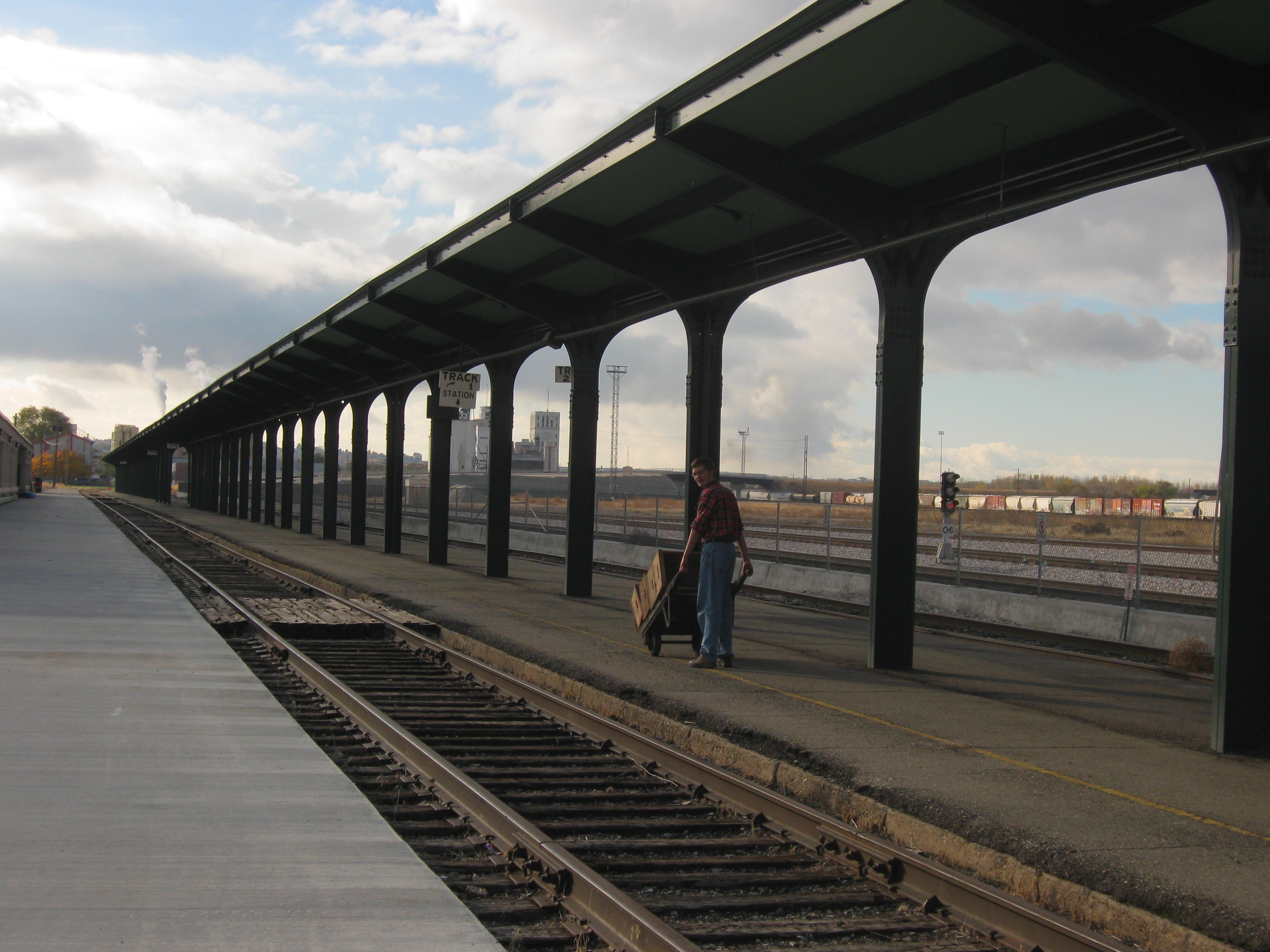
Butterfly canopy, November 2010

The passenger shelter along tracks 1 and 2 is the only remaining canopy of a series of five. The other four canopies were demolished in April 1969. It was built in 1928 to SP plans and is similar to canopies at the Sacramento Station in California, and is 23 feet (7.0 m) wide. During the peak of passenger train travel in 1927, a tunnel was built under the eleven tracks with stairways to the surface at each platform. Called the passenger subway, this tunnel allowed pedestrians to access all eleven tracks from the Grand Lobby, bypassing those tracks that were occupied by trains. When passenger service ended the entries to the tunnel were filled in for safety purposes, although when the platform was repaved in 2008 a portion of the tunnel was uncovered. Plans are to place a glass over the uncovered portion for visitors to see. Similar canopies are used at the adjacent Ogden Central Station as a reference to Ogden's railroading past. The Butterfly Canopy and platforms are host to UP's Steam Team during their east–west trips over the Transcontinental Railroad route and the former Rio Grande Soldier Summit route. The operating water column at the north end, which is connected to the Ogden City water line, allows the steam locomotives to be serviced conveniently.

=== Laundry building ===
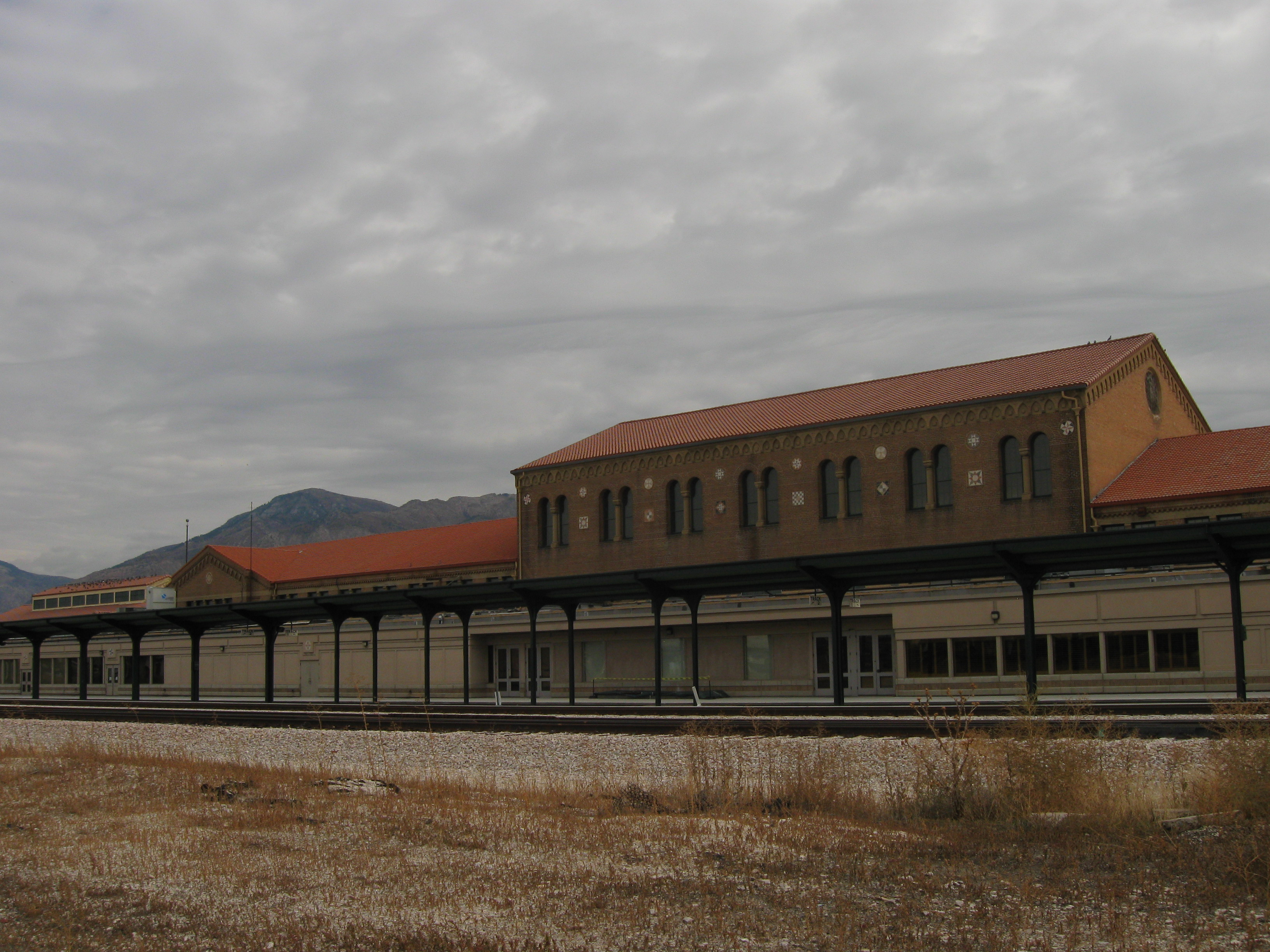
Station building trackside, October 2009

The laundry operations at Union Station date to 1906, when they were carried out in the commissary building (now demolished, on the site of the current Spencer S. & Dolores Dore' Eccles Rail Center). Soiled linens and cloth from sleeper and diner cars were removed from the trains and washed during their stop in Ogden. In 1951, UP constructed a 100 by 180 feet (30 m × 55 m) brick building for the express purpose of washing laundry; prior to this time excess laundry that was not able to be handled in the commissary building was sent out to commercial facilities.

The building was constructed to centralize the UP's laundry operations and to cut costs by an estimated fifty percent. It was the only laundry facility constructed by the UP and was expected to pay for itself within three years. Laundry was sent to Ogden from all ends of the UP Lines, and even took in laundry from Sun Valley, Idaho; West Yellowstone Lodge; Bryce Canyon National Park; Zion National Park; and Grand Canyon National Park, as well as other resorts and hotels.

The use of the latest equipment, such as nine Troy Electromatic washers; 42 individual pressers; and seven diesel-powered Vapor-Clarkson steam generators, as well as 105 employees, gave the building a capacity to process 110,000 individual pieces of laundry during an eight-hour shift, or about 13,333 individual pieces per hour.

The laundry facility was closed in 1970 and donated to the Ogden City in 1986. It is currently vacant.

== Railroad Museum ==
=== Spencer S. & Dolores Doré Eccles Rail Center ===
The Spencer S. & Dolores Doré Eccles Rail Center (also known as the Spencer S. Eccles Rail Center) is a collection of prototype equipment from various railroads in the west, most notably UP. It occupies the spot where the OUR&D Commissary Building once stood. It houses several locomotives, as well as passenger cars, freight cars, cabooses, and railroad maintenance equipment.

== Locomotives ==
=== CRGX #6751 ===
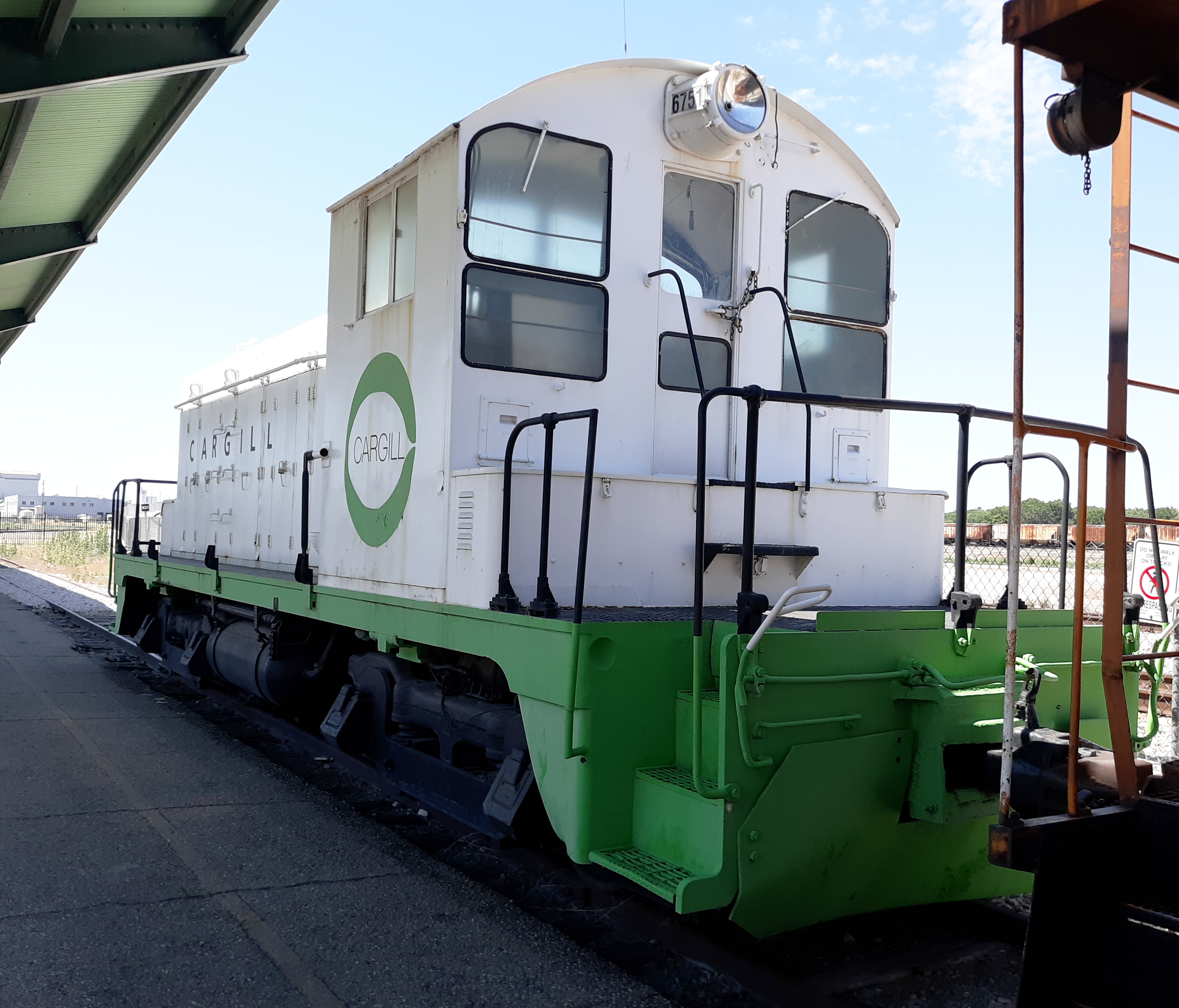
CRGX #6751, an EMD SW1

Cargill 6751 is a General Motors (GM) Electro-Motive Corporation SW1 diesel-electric switcher locomotive built in 1940 with construction number 1111, was one of the first SW1s that Electro-Motive built. After acquisition, the Baltimore and Ohio Railroad (B&O) initially numbered the locomotive as 213, but subsequently changed the number to 8413. Leased by the Washington and Old Dominion Railroad (W&OD) in 1968, it was one of the last locomotives to operate on the W&OD before the railroad closed during the same year. After several transfers of ownership, the locomotive was acquired by Cargill, becoming Cargill No. 6751. Cargill moved the locomotive to Ogden in 1993 for use in the company's Globe Mill. Following Cargill's donation of the locomotive in 2010, the Utah Central Railway and the UP delivered it to the museum on May 21, 2011.

=== D&RGW #5371 ===
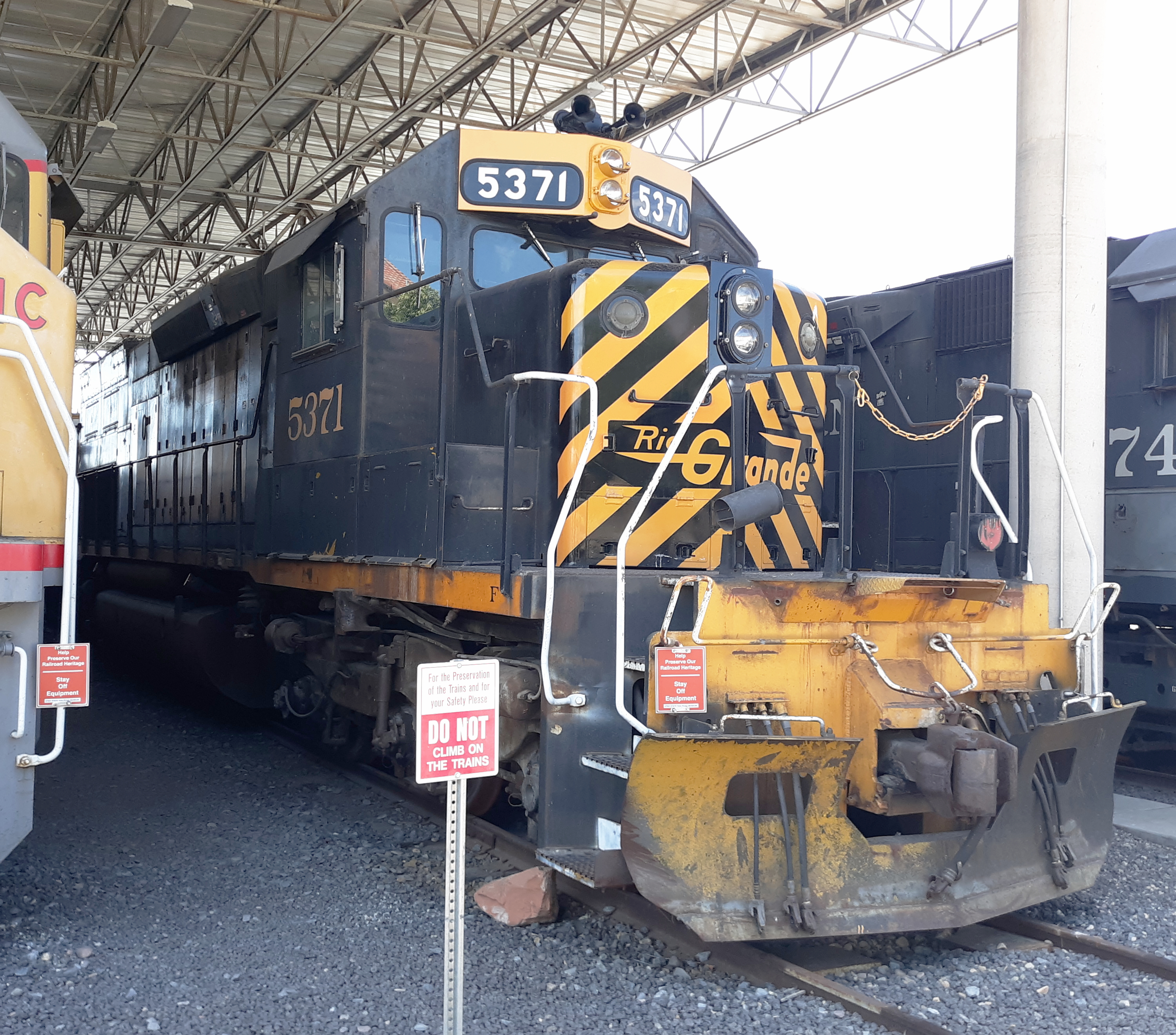
DRG&W #5371, an EMD SD40T-2 Tunnel Motor

Denver & Rio Grande Western 5371 is the last GM Electro-Motive Division SD40T-2 "Tunnel Motor" to be in its original Rio Grande paint colors. It was retired in 2009 and moved into the Rail Center in 2010.

=== D&RGW #133 ===

An EMD SW1200 owned by the Promontory Chapter of the National Railway Historical Society which arrived to the museum in 2025 on a two-year loan. Restoration work will occur on the museum grounds during its stay.

=== NKP #324 ===
NKP #324, Manufactured in November 1955 by the American Locomotive Company (ALCO) as Utah Railway Company #306 (Serial #81696).

Nickel Plate Road (NKP) #324 is not a true Nickel Plate Road locomotive, but a fictional paint scheme applied to this rare surviving ALCO RSD-5 diesel-electric locomotive. Manufactured in November 1955 by the American Locomotive Company (ALCO) as Utah Railway Company #306 (Serial #81696), it is a six-axle road switcher designed for heavy freight service through rugged canyons and coal country in Utah. The unit was retired by the Utah Railway in May 1982, then sold to Industrial Salvage & Metals of Salt Lake City in November 1983. In January 1984, the locomotive was traded to the Promontory Chapter of the NRHS (National Railway Historical Society). In October 1993, the locomotive was purchased by railroad preservationist Doyle McCormack, who painted and lettered the engine as "Nickel Plate Road #324," though it technically carried the DLMX reporting mark. The real Nickel Plate Road never owned any RSD-5s (they operated the similar 4-axle ALCO RS-3 models instead). The number 324 was chosen simply because it was an unused roster number on the historical Nickel Plate roster, sitting right between the road's Baldwin AS-16s and ALCO RSD-12s. For years, the locomotive served as a yard switcher and display piece—including time at the Oregon Rail Heritage Center (ORHC) in Portland, Oregon. It eventually headed back to Utah to be preserved at the Utah State Railroad Museum in Ogden, Utah, for restoration and display; it is planned for the locomotive to be restored back to its Utah Railway colors.

=== SP #3769 ===

Southern Pacific 3769 is a GM Electro-Motive Division GP-9 diesel-electric switcher locomotive, built in February 1957 as 5733. In the mid-1970s it was rebuilt as a GP9R, and renumbered to 3769.

=== SP #7457 ===
Southern Pacific 7457 is the first GM Electro-Motive Division SD45 diesel-electric switcher locomotive to be built for SP in August 1966, originally numbered 8800. It was rebuilt as an SD45R in September 1982, and renumbered to 7457. It last saw service on Donner Pass. It was donated to the Utah State Railroad Museum in 2002.

=== UCRY #1237 ===
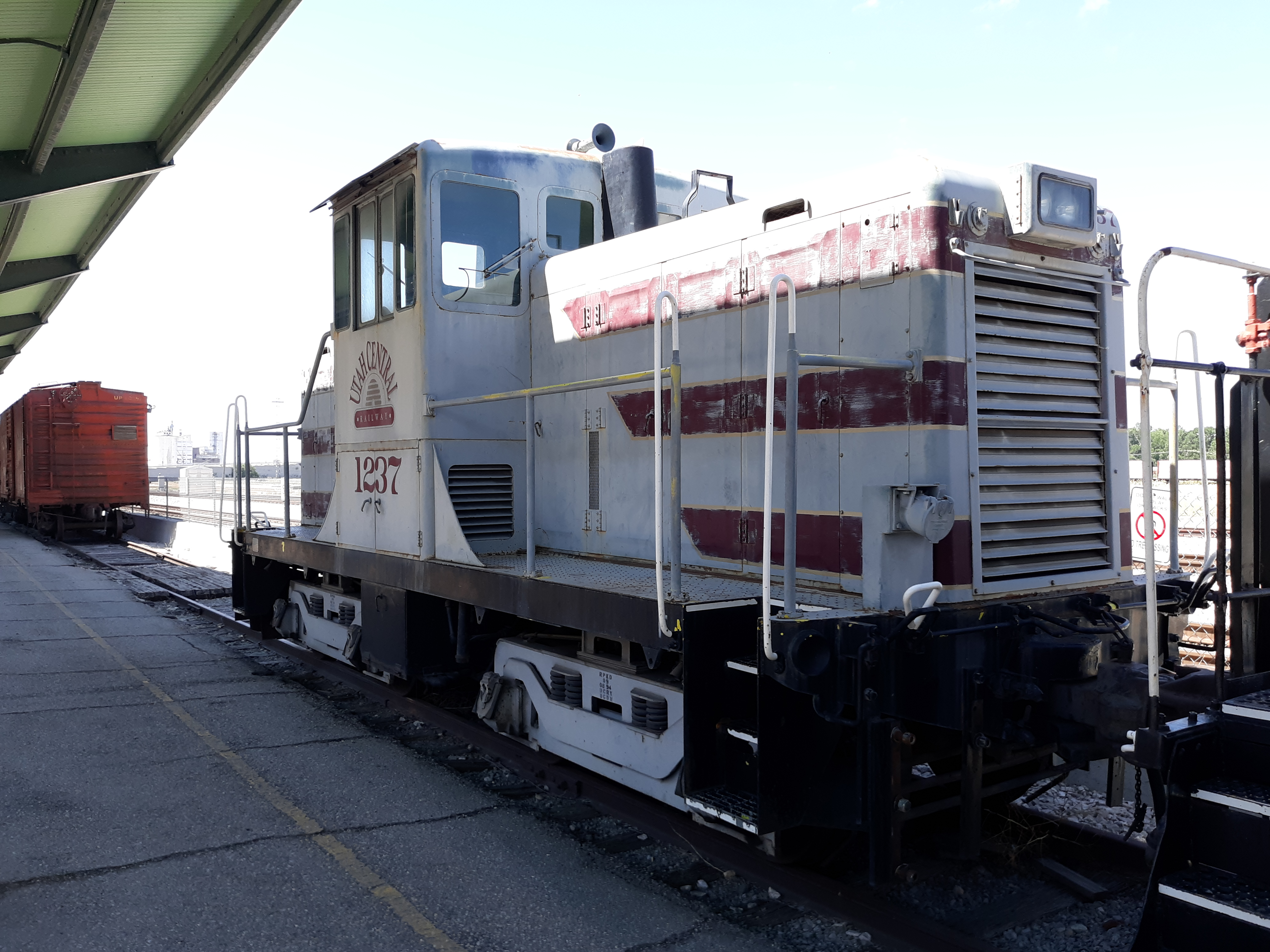
UCRY 1237, a former USAF GE 44-ton switcher

Utah Central Railway 1237 is a 44-ton General Electric diesel-electric switcher, originally built for the U.S. Air Force with the same number in 1953. It was donated to the Utah State Railroad Museum, and subsequently leased to the Utah Central Railway where it got its current paint scheme. It has since been returned to the Museum.

=== UP #833 ===
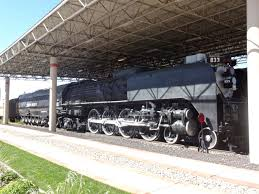
UP #833, an FEF-2 steamer, sister locomotive to the Union Pacific FEF-3 844

Union Pacific 833 is an FEF-2 class steam locomotive, built by the American Locomotive Company (ALCO) in 1939. It was originally donated to Salt Lake City in 1972, and when transferred to Ogden in 1999 it obtained the distinction of being the largest locomotive in the United States to be moved by truck.

=== UP #4436 ===

Union Pacific 4436 is an 0-6-0 steam switcher built by Baldwin Locomotive Works in 1918. It was last used in Cheyenne, Wyoming. It was donated to Ogden City in 1958 and moved to the Utah State Railroad Museum upon its establishment.

=== UP #6916 ===
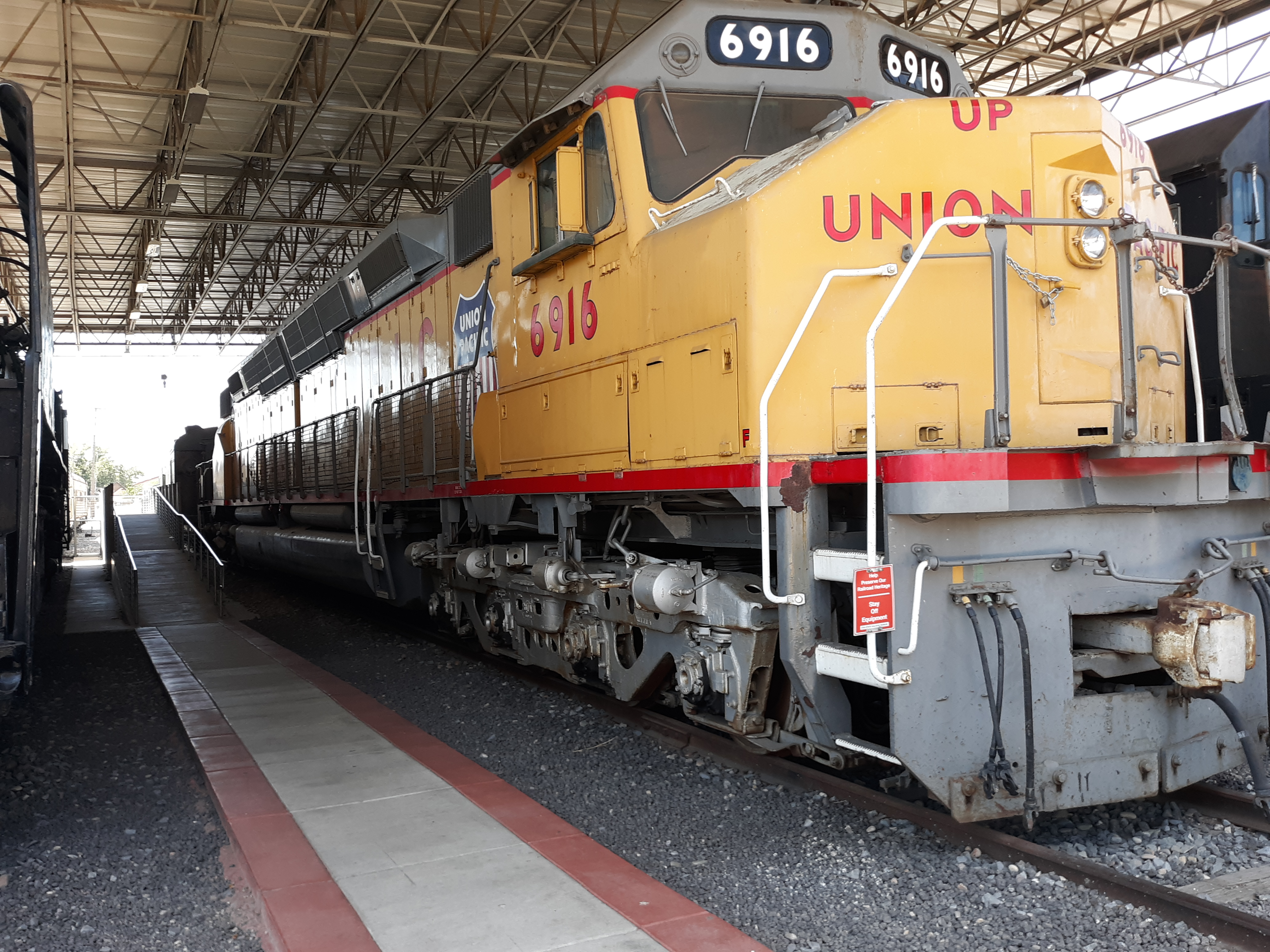
UP #6916, an EMD DDA40X

Union Pacific 6916 is a DDA40X "Centennial" diesel-electric locomotive that GM's Electro-Motive Division (EMD) built in 1969, one of only 47 built. Retired in 1985 and donated to the Utah State Railroad Museum in 1986.

=== Union Pacific Rotary Snowplow #900061 ===

Union Pacific Rotary Snowplow #900061 was built in January 1913 by Rogers Locomotive Works (serial #51167) as Oregon, Washington Railway & Navigation Co. (OWRR&N) #061.

=== UP #X-26 ===
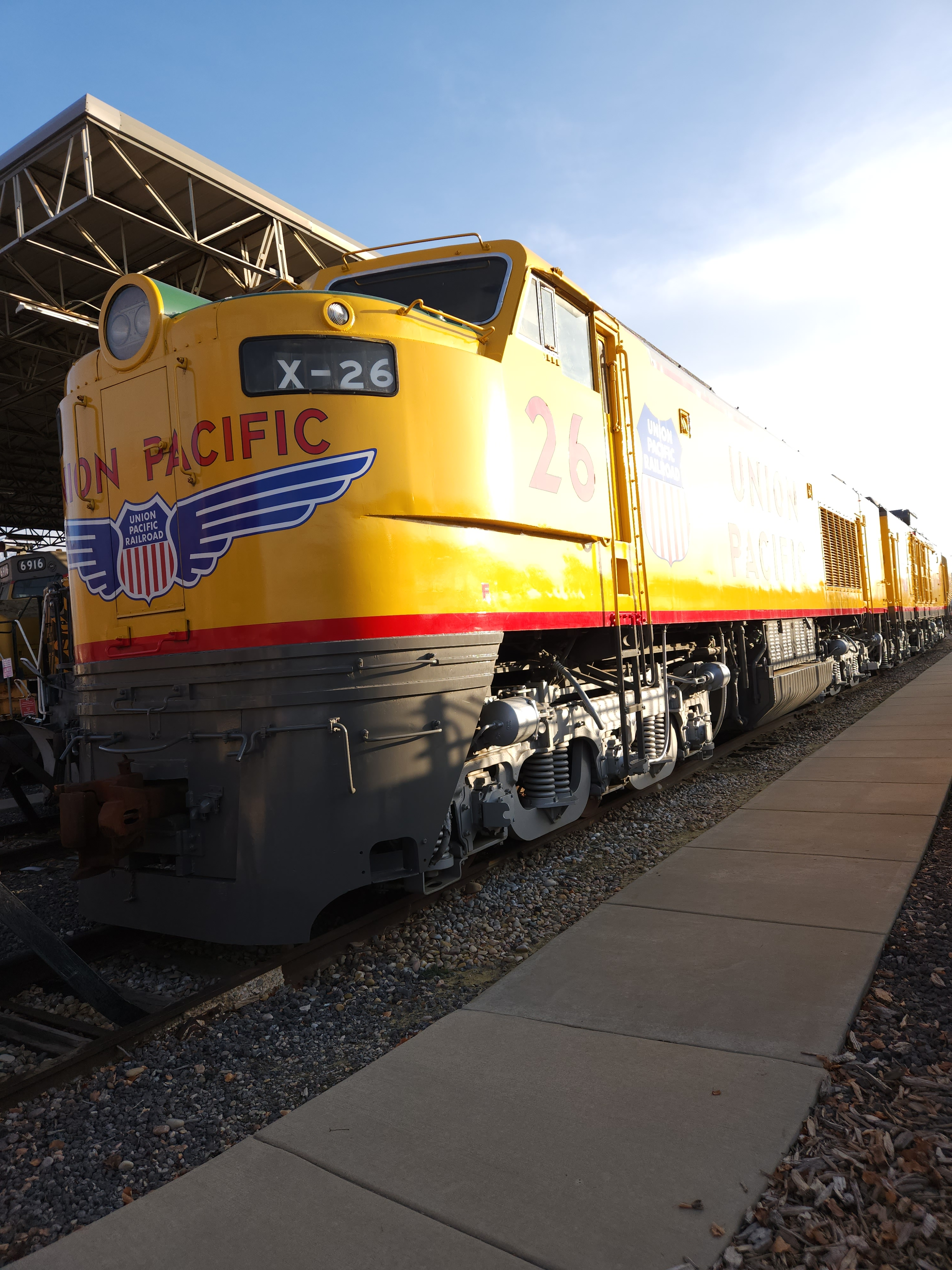
UP #26, one of two surviving GE "Big Blow" 8500 Gas turbine locomotives, this class is also known as GTEL's (Gas Turbine Electric Locomotives)

Union Pacific X-26 is one of the Union Pacific gas turbine-electric locomotives (GTELs) that General Electric built in 1961. It was advertised as the "most powerful locomotive in the world". Popularly known as "Big Blows", it is one of only two that survived. The other one is displayed at the Illinois Railway Museum in Union, Illinois.

=== U.S. Army #1216 ===
USAX 1216 is a 44-ton Davenport Locomotive Works switcher that was originally used at the Tooele Army Depot in Tooele, Utah.

=== Utah Railway #306 ===
This is a ALCO RSD-5 original to the Utah Railway. Owned previously by Doyle McCormack and kept at the Oregon Rail Heritage Foundation where it was painted as a Nickel Plate Road locomotive. Repatriated to Utah in September 2022 with plans to restore it to its Utah Railway colors.

=== Utah Railway #401 ===
A former ATSF ALCO RSD-15 built in 1959, it served on the Santa Fe railway until being sold to the Utah Railway in 1977, it was retired and donated to the museum in 1989.

=== Utah Railway #5004 ===
An MK50-3 built by Morrison-Knudsen in 1994 as an MK5000C demonstrator locomotive, before being sold to the Utah Railway in 2001. Later rebuilt as an MK50-3 for the Utah Railway. Moved to the Kyle Railroad in 2017.

On June 24, 2026; the Promontory Chapter of the National Railway Historical Society announced on their Facebook page that Utah Railway 5004 had been acquired from the Kyle Railroad; and would return to the Utah State Railroad Museum for preservation. The locomotive arrived in Ogden in July 2026.

Western Pacific #3002

Western Pacific #3002 is an EMD GP35 built in 1963 and worked for the WP, Union Pacific, Kyle Railroad, Arkansas Midland Railroad and eventually the Genesee & Wyoming before being retired in early 2023. It was then transported to the FrontRunner's shops in Salt Lake City where it was restored to its as-delivered appearance and donated to the museum in May 2024.

== Ex-Union Station Locomotives/ Rolling Stock ==
=== D&RGW #223 ===
Denver & Rio Grande Western 223 is a class C-16 Consolidation type steam locomotive built in 1881 by the Grant Locomotive Works. Restoration was on hold due to dispute between Ogden City, the State of Utah, and the Railway and Locomotive Historical Society Golden Spike Chapter regarding building usage and ownership of the locomotive. In 2025, it was announced the locomotive would be repatriated to Colorado where with the assistance of the Colorado Railroad Museum restoration will be completed and the locomotive will return to operation.

== Rolling Stock ==
=== 2002 Winter Olympics Cauldron Car ===
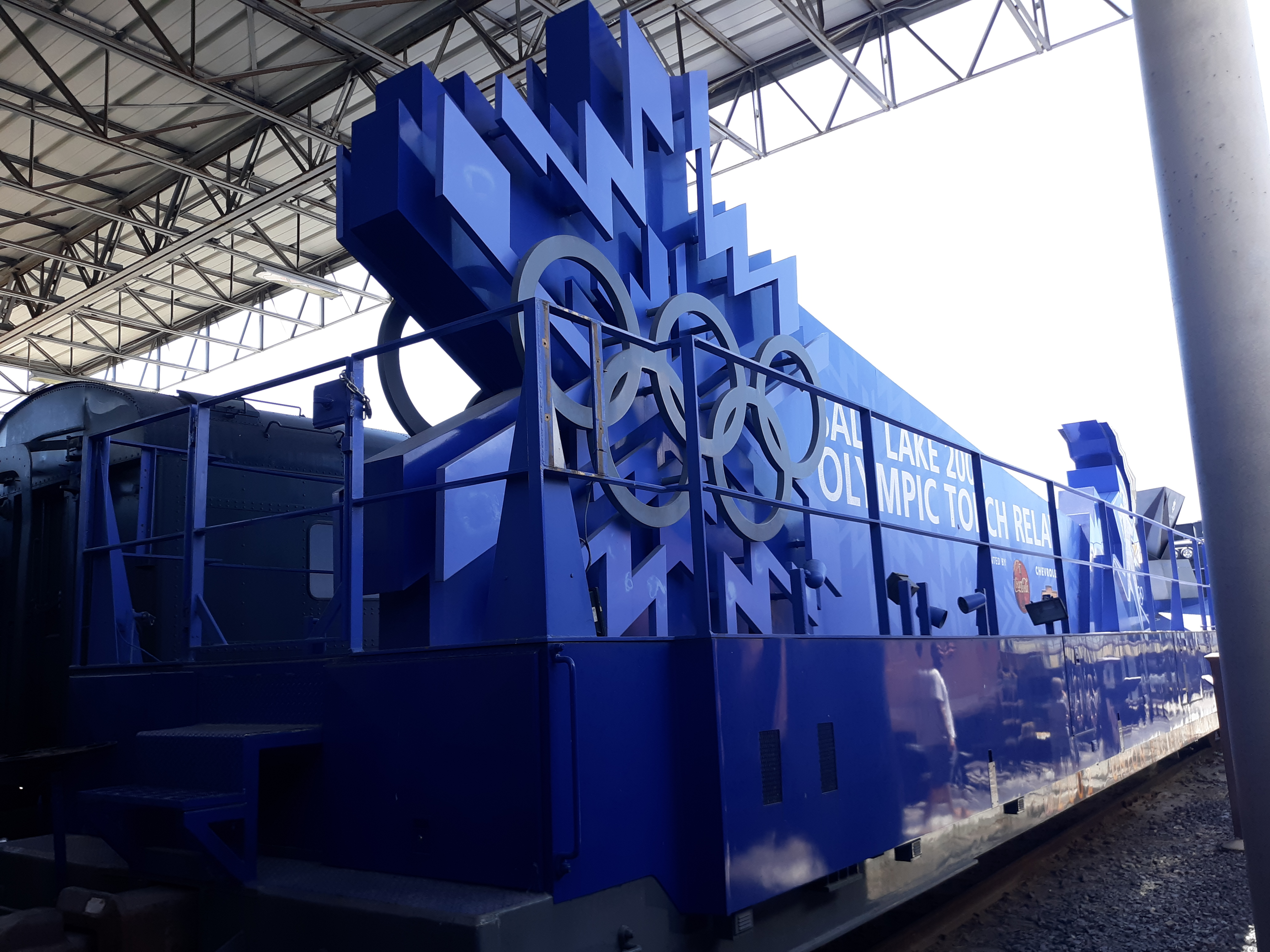
Union Pacific 2002 Winter Olympics Cauldron car

This specially designed flatcar was used by UP to transport the Olympic flame as part of the 2002 Winter Olympics torch relay is displayed at the museum. UP donated the car to the museum after the conclusion of the 2002 Winter Olympics.

More Coming soon

== Passenger Cars ==
=== U.S. Army Hospital Car ===
This was one of at least 100 special passenger coaches that were retrofitted by the US Army for use as a hospital car to transport wounded soldiers during WWII. The car was acquired by the museum in 2001 and was restored to its original condition. In 2003, the restored interior of the car was opened to the public and is now open for tours and visitors.

=== Union Pacific Golden Spike Centennial Expo Railcar ===
This is a former passenger coach that was specially painted by the UP for use as a display car in celebration of the 100th anniversary of the driving of the Golden Spike in May 1969. The car currently sits on static display with badly faded paint.

== Cabooses ==
To Be finished within the day

== Future of the station ==
Amtrak has been involved in feasibility studies regarding the restoration of some previously discontinued routes, including the Pioneer through Ogden. However, Ogden and the Pioneer were not included in Amtrak's "Connects US" plan, which details how the corporation wishes to expand their rail service between 2020 and 2035.

On December 8, 2022, Ogden City entered into a purchase agreement with Union Pacific Railroad to buy the land under and around the station building for $5.5 million (equivalent to $6.84 million in 2025). They did this to avoid potentially losing the station if UP decided to sell the land privately after the end of their initial lease agreement. As part of the purchase, Ogden City presented extensive plans to redevelop the area around the station into a downtown business and tourist hub. This would include moving the museums out of the station and into a new museum building right next door, which would include the current Eccles Rail Center. They also want to work with the UTA to potentially move the station platforms for their FrontRunner commuter rail service to the station itself, which would bring rail service back to the station and allow rail commuters to use the station's Grand Lobby. There is now a 180-day feasibility study underway to make sure Ogden City is willing to undertake the cost and labor of environmental cleanup in the station area before they could begin developing it.

== See also ==
- National Register of Historic Places in Weber County, Utah
- List of Amtrak stations
- List of museums in Utah
