= MK Rail MK5000C =

Diesel electric locomotive

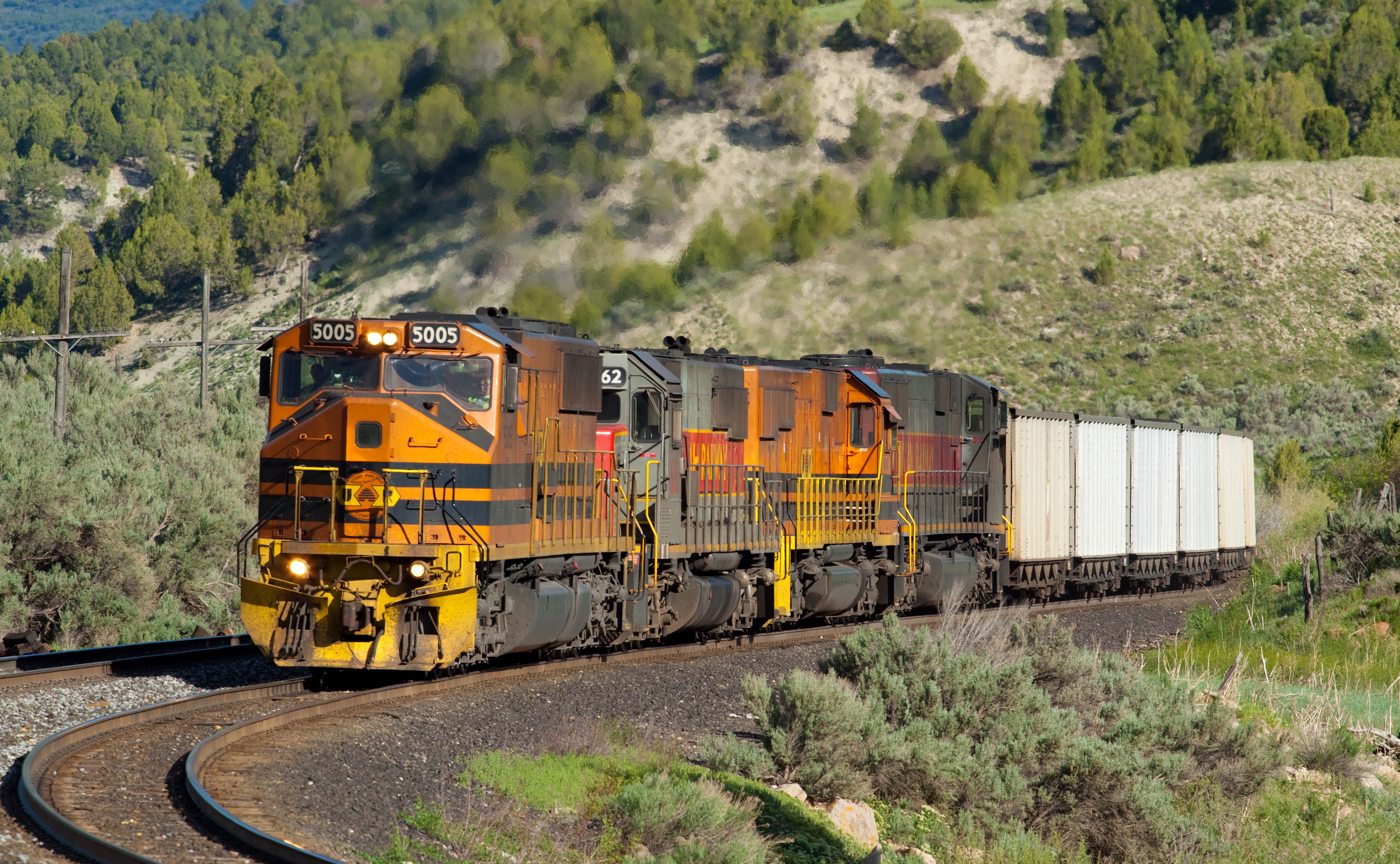
- Utah Railway 5005 leading through Spanish Fork Canyon in June of 2010
Type and origin
- Power type: Diesel-Electric
- Builder: Morrison-Knudsen
- Build date: August 1994 - August 1995
- Total produced: 6
Specifications
- Configuration
  - AAR: C-C
- Gauge: 4 ft 8 1/2 in (1,435 mm) standard gauge
- Prime mover: Caterpillar 3612
- Cylinders: 12
Performance figures
- Power output: 5,000 hp (3.7 MW)
Career
- Operators: Southern Pacific; Union Pacific; Kyle Railroad; Utah Railway
- Numbers: 501 - 503 (Southern Pacific); 9901 - 9903 (Union Pacific)
- Delivered: 1994/95
- Retired: 2002 (as MK5000Cs) July 2026 (as MK50-3s)
- Preserved: Utah Railway #5004
- Disposition: All rebuilt as MK50-3s, at the Kyle Railroad; one preserved

The MK Rail MK5000C is a 5,000 hp (3.7 MW) North American diesel-electric locomotive developed by MK Rail. At the time of its creation, it was one of the most powerful diesel locomotives with one diesel engine, second only to the Soviet TE136, 2TE126, and 2TE136 (6000 hp).

In the early 1990s MK Rail, a long time locomotive remanufacturer, announced its plan to compete directly with Electro-Motive Diesel and GE Transportation by beginning its own high-horsepower locomotive program, starting with a 5,000 hp (3.7 MW) DC drive locomotive and intending to continue with 5,500 hp (4.1 MW) and 6,000 hp (4.5 MW) AC drive locomotives in later years.

In response to the MKRail program, GE announced the 6000 hp AC drive GE AC6000CW, and EMD announced the 5,000 hp (3.7 MW) EMD SD80MAC, and later the 6,000 hp (4.5 MW) EMD SD90MAC, both which were AC drive locomotives.

== Technical ==
The MK5000C was powered by the 5000 hp Caterpillar V12 3612 diesel engine. This diesel engine remains one of the largest engine blocks used in rail service in North America. The Cat 3612 features a 280 mm (11.0 in) bore with a 300 mm (11.8 in) stroke and has a 1,121 cu in (18.37 L) displacement per cylinder, 13,456 cu in (220.50 L) total. The 3612 has dual turbochargers that are liquid aftercooled. The 3612 idles at 300 rpm and has a maximum speed of 1000 rpm.

The Caterpillar 3612 drove a Kato 16P12-27000 main alternator which was capable of handling 8400 amperes at 1315 V DC at 1000 rpm. The power generated by the main alternator drove 6 MK1000 traction motors, each with a gear ratio of 83:20 and connected to 40-inch (1,016 mm) wheels which allowed the MK5000C a maximum speed of 70 mph (110 km/h). The MK5000C rode on two 3 axle Dofasco designed bolster-less trucks, the same that many Canadian MLW and GE designed locomotives ride on.

The first 3 MK5000Cs were 71 ft 2 in (21.69 m) long, while the last three were 73 ft 4 in (22.35 m) in length, all six were 15 ft 11 1/2 in (4.864 m) tall and 10 ft (3.0 m) wide. The MK5000C weighed 396,000 lb (180 t).

Like most modern locomotives, the MK5000C was microprocessor controlled, using an in-house designed system called the MK-LOC. This system monitored the performance of all aspects of the locomotive and controlled the power output as well as the traction control/adhesion of the locomotive. The MK5000C also had electro-pneumatic braking, provided by the EPIC 3102 air brake system which can be found on locomotives of other builders.

The MK5000C carried 5300 US gallons (20,100 L) of diesel, 246 US gal (931 L) of lubricating oil, and 320 gallons (1,210 L) of coolant. This coolant system was unlike that of most other North American locomotives, using a water/antifreeze mix; only a few Caterpillar-repowered switchers and the Electro Motive Division SD90MAC share this trait.

The MK5000C generated 118,000 lbf (525 kN) of continuous tractive effort, and produced around 35% adhesion on dry rail.

== Appearance ==
The MK5000C has a fuel tank and long hood that appear very similar to EMD designs; however mechanically the MK5000C shares very little in common with any EMD product.

== History ==
Six were built, three in August 1994 for demonstration on the Southern Pacific numbered 501 to 503, and another three in August 1995 for demonstration on the Union Pacific numbered 9901 to 9903. Due to termination of the MK Rail high horsepower program, neither railroad purchased the model, and the units were returned after one year of demonstrations. Production was stopped after the sale of MK Rail in 1996, and three more partially built units sat in storage until 2001, when their frames were scrapped by MK Rail successor Motive Power. One of the MK5000C cabs was used on Dakota, Minnesota & Eastern Railroad 5000, a former ATSF SD45B rebuilt into a SD50M-3. This unit is still in service as MPEX 5000, and can be found in lease service on various railroads in North America. The other six were leased briefly to BC Rail.

In 2001 the Utah Railway tested and later acquired all six from Wabtec, the owner of Motive Power. However, after one year of operation, all units were out of service due to problems with the main bearings on the Caterpillar 3612 diesel engine and Kato main alternator. The units were returned to Wabtec and had the Caterpillar 3612 and Kato main alternator removed and replaced with an EMD AR11 main alternator. At the same time, the engine blocks were replaced by EMD 3500 Horsepower 16-645F3B diesel engines from five retired Union Pacific EMD SD50 and one retired Union Pacific EMD GP50 locomotives. The six were reclassed with the designation MK50-3 and put back in service with the Utah Railway.

In March 2017, four units were prepared to be shipped to the Kyle Railroad, a few months after Utah Railway's coal train contracts expired. A BNSF train picked up the four units and left with them on March 14, 2017. A fifth unit left the Utah Railway in late March/April, and the final unit departed on April 6, 2017.

In June 2024, Kyle Railroad took delivery of four former Kansas City Southern GE C44-9W locomotives, with the goal of replacing the fleet of MK5000C's. All six MK5000C's have been sidelined as of July 2026.

== Preservation ==
On June 24, 2026, the Promontory Chapter of the National Railway Historical Society announced on their Facebook page that Utah Railway #5004 (ex Union Pacific #9901) had been acquired from the Kyle Railroad and would return to the Utah State Railroad Museum for preservation. The NRHS stated their goal was to evaluate the engine once in Ogden for future preservation options, with hopes to keep it operational. #5004 arrived in Ogden in July 2026, with a planned two year stay at the museum.
