= Kyle Railroad =

Regional railroad line that runs from North Central Kansas into Eastern Colorado

Overview
- Parent company: Genesee & Wyoming
- Headquarters: Phillipsburg, Kansas
- Reporting mark: KYLE
- Locale: Kansas, Colorado
- Dates of operation: 1982–present
- Predecessor: Chicago, Rock Island and Pacific

Technical
- Track gauge: 4 ft 8 1/2 in (1,435 mm)
- Length: 508 miles (818 km)

Other
- Website: https://www.gwrr.com/kyle/

The Kyle Railroad (reporting mark KYLE) is a regional railroad line that runs from north central Kansas into eastern Colorado. It is based in Phillipsburg, Kansas and runs on 508 miles (818 km) of track, mostly the former Chicago, Rock Island and Pacific Railroad's Chicago to Denver main line. The Kyle was owned by RailAmerica from 2002 to 2012. Genesee & Wyoming Inc. bought RailAmerica in late 2012. As of 2024, KYLE holds 508 total miles (89 in Colorado and 419 in Kansas), has a maximum capacity of 286,000 gross pounds per railcar. KYLE also has two interchanges with two railroads: BNSF at Courtland, Kansas and Concordia, Kansas, and Union Pacific at Limon, Colorado and Salina, Kansas.

== History ==
The Kyle Railroad was formed for the 1982 northern Kansas harvest season by the Willis B. Kyle Organization, which consisted of several railroad properties, including the San Diego and Arizona Eastern Railway, the Oregon, Pacific and Eastern Railway, the Cumbres and Toltec Scenic Railroad and the Pend Oreille Valley Railroad. Included was about 360 miles (580 km) of trackage from Mahaska, KS to Limon, CO. Officially, on September 16, 1980, The Kyle Railroad signed with the MSPA (Mid-States Port Authority) a contract for the Mahaska, KS to Limon, CO and Belleville, KS to Clay Center, KS line. The Kyle Railroad acted as the MSPA's operator of these lines.

In 2009 the Kyle Railroad bought the tracks on which it operates from the MSPA.

Power for the trains initially consisted of former Burlington Northern Railroad ALCO Century 425s, most tracing their heritage to the Spokane, Portland and Seattle Railway. Kyle Railroad migrated to General Electric U30C and U33C power by the mid-2000s. After RailAmerica purchased Kyle, the legacy GE power was dropped in favor of EMD power, including former Burlington Northern SD40-2s and Southern Pacific SD45T-2s. With the purchase by Genesee and Wyoming, six MK5000C's (rebuilt as MK50-3s) provided by the Utah Railway (a fellow subsidiary of Genesee & Wyoming) entered operation on the Kyle Railroad, joining the older EMD locomotives. In June 2024, Kyle Railroad took delivery of four ex- Kansas City Southern GE C44-9W's.

== Traffic ==
The railroad handles mostly agricultural commodities, including various grains and fertilizers. Large amounts of roofing shingles and scrap metal are also hauled. About 24,000 carloads were moved in 2016.
