= M-K TE70-4S =

Train locomotive model

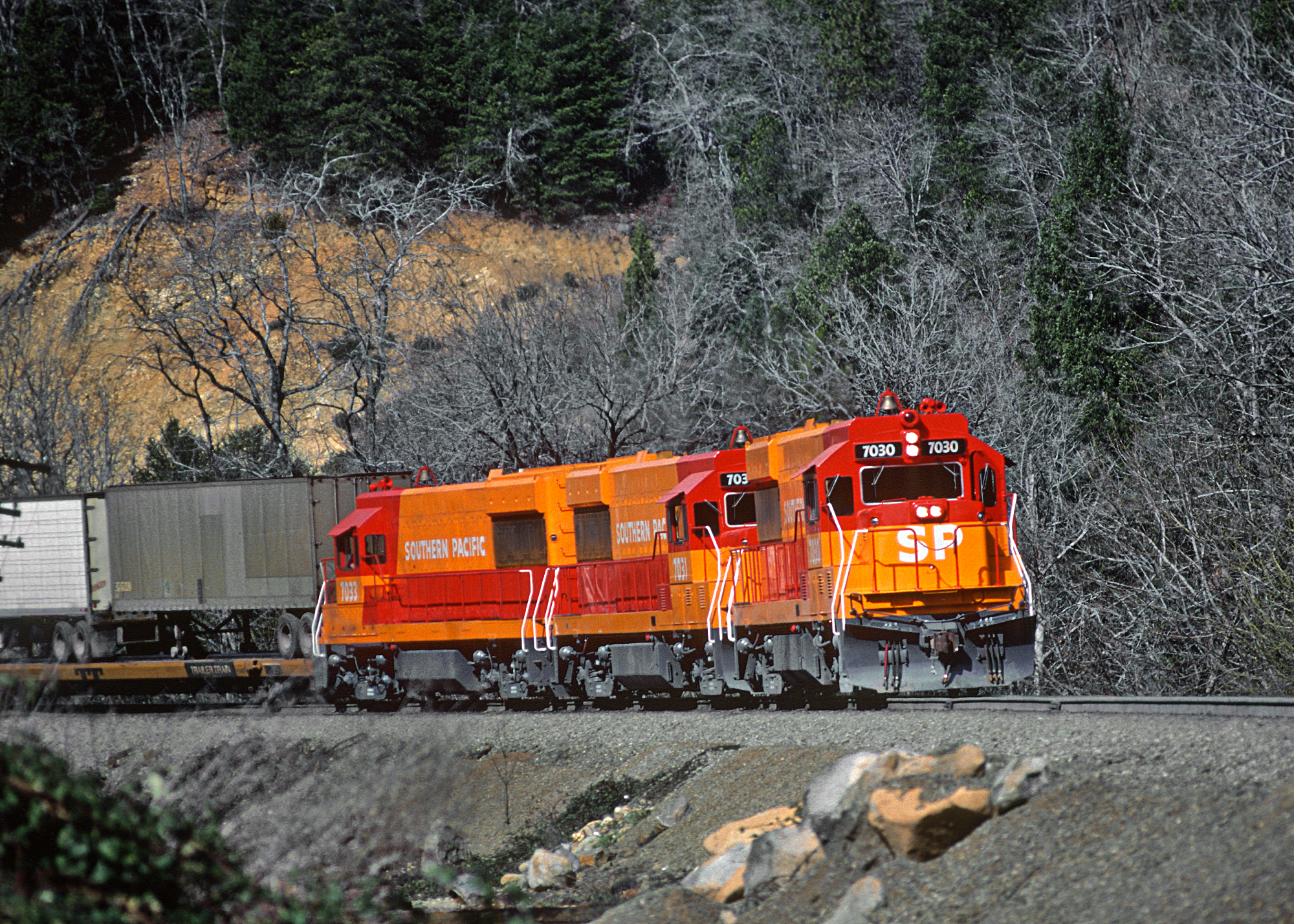
- Three of the four SP M-K TE70-4S locomotives on their maiden run in March 1978
Type and origin
- Power type: Diesel-electric
- Designer: General Electric
- Builder: Morrison-Knudsen
- Total produced: 4
- Rebuild date: 1977 - 1978
Specifications
- Gauge: 4 ft 8 1/2 in (1,435 mm)
- Wheel diameter: 40 in (100 cm)
- Length: 60 ft 2 in (18.3 m)
- Width: 10 ft 7 1/2 in (3.2 m)
- Height: 15 ft 10 7/8 in (4.8 m)
- Loco weight: 279,000 lb (126,552 kg)
- Prime mover: Sulzer 12ASV 25/30
- RPM range: 1000
- Generator: GE GT598 D3A
- Traction motors: GE 752
- Gear ratio: 74/18
Performance figures
- Maximum speed: 70 mph (110 km/h)
- Power output: 2,800 hp (2.1 MW)
Career
- Operators: Southern Pacific Transportation Company
- Class: TE70-4S
- Numbers: 7030 - 7033
- Nicknames: Popsicle
- First run: March 1, 1978
- Retired: 1987
- Disposition: All scrapped

The M-K TE70-4S was a four-axle 2,800 hp (2.1 MW) B-B diesel-electric locomotive built by Morrison-Knudsen. The locomotive was a rebuild of the GE U25B with a Sulzer V-12 prime mover installed. Morrison-Knudsen rebuilt four for the Southern Pacific Railroad in 1978. The experiment proved unsuccessful and no additional units were rebuilt.

== Design ==
The prime mover for the M-K TE70-4S was a Sulzer 12ASV 25/30. Normally found in marine or stationary uses, the 12ASV 25/30 had been in production since 1969. The four-stroke turbocharged engine was rated for a maximum of 3,240 hp (2.4 MW) at 1000 RPM. The locomotives retained the GE GT598 D3A generators and GE 752 traction motors from the U25B. The capability of the prime mover notwithstanding, the locomotive was rated at 2,800 hp (2.1 MW).

The new prime mover required substantial alterations to the cab, carbody, and underframe. The locomotive measured 60 ft 2 in (18.3 m) long by 10 ft 7 1/2 in (3.2 m) wide, and stood 15 ft 10 7/8 in (4.8 m) high. It weighed 279,000 lb (126,552 kg).

== History ==
Southern Pacific sent four GE U25Bs (Nos. 7030–7033), then at the end of their service life, to Morrison-Knudsen for rebuilding. Morrison-Knudsen rebuilt the four locomotives in its Boise, Idaho, shops in 1977–1978. The first revenue run occurred beginning March 1, 1978, when the four locomotives handled a Seattle–Los Angeles trailer-on-flatcar (TOFC) train between Portland and Los Angeles. Inauspiciously, one of the four locomotives broke down during the trip.

The locomotives carried a unique paint scheme featuring the red-and-orange of the SP's famed "Daylight" passenger trains, albeit in a different style. The color scheme led to the nickname "Popsicle". Due to their consistent unreliability, all four were retired in 1987 after less than ten years; none were preserved.
