= Utah Cowboy and Western Heritage Museum =

Hall of Fame for Cowboys

- Established: 2012
- Location: Union Station, 2501 Wall Avenue, Ogden, UT 84401
- Coordinates: 41.22078°N 111.97973°W
- Type: Hall of fame
- Website: utahcowboymuseum.org

The Utah Cowboy and Western Heritage Museum, located in Ogden, Utah, is a state-recognized museum which collects and presents artifacts of the American frontier. It is situated in Ogden Union Station, along with the Utah State Railroad Museum, John M. Browning Firearms Museum, Kimball Classic Car Museum, and Myra Powell Gallery. The Cowboy Museum contains the Utah Cowboy Hall of Fame, which is associated with the Ogden Pioneer Heritage Foundation.

The museum plans to expand to include a research center in the future.

The museum was established in 2012, with a grant from the state of Utah, to honor the cowboy, along with those men and women whose lives exemplify the independence, resilience and creativeness of the people who settled Utah and continue to champion the Western way of life. This includes artists, champions, competitive performers, entertainers, musicians, ranchers, writers, and persons past and present who have promoted the Western lifestyle.

The museum was established under the auspices of the Ogden Pioneer Days Foundation, who asked Susan Van Hooser to chair the establishment of the museum. She and her committee only had about six weeks to accomplish that goal. It was only open for the month of July that first year, but by the following year the museum committee, with the help of a benefactor and the Foundation were able to find a location within the Union Station building, which is rapidly being outgrown.

The museum endeavors to collect Western artifacts that paint a historical picture of the diversity related to the establishment and development of our Western ethic, including those accessories that are peculiar to the American cowboy.

Although at present - June 22, 2018 - we do not have room for a library, we have collected quite a few books relating to Western history, arts and crafts, and reprints of old catalogues showing styles of spurs, saddles, hats and various western memorabilia. We also have quite a few books dealing with the history, culture and crafts of the Native American. In addition we have photographs, histories - oral and written - documenting Utah's Western culture and its people, including Native Americans.

It is hoped that in the not too distant future, these items will be available for research purposes.

Each year applicants for the Hall of Fame can be submitted. A committee of individuals not connected to the museum are provided with a packet for individuals submitted. Through an individual and private voting process, with up to three votes taken to narrow the field, the winners are determined. The first part of July the inductions are carried out at Union Station. Anyone interested can attend the induction ceremony free of charge.

== Selected Hall of Fame inductees ==
A selected list of notable inductees to the Utah Cowboy Hall of Fame includes:

- Gary Cooper (1901-1961)
- Grant Speed (1930-2011), cowboy artist - 2014
- Earl W. Bascom (1906-1995), rodeo champion, cowboy artist and sculptor - 2013
- Lewis Feild (1956-2016), rodeo champion - 2012

== Hall of Fame Inductees ==
The Utah Cowboy and Western Heritage Museum recognizes those individuals who settled Utah. It also recognizes individuals from many disciplines who have or continue to promote the Western style of living.

2019

- Val Leavitt
- Raymond Moser
- Gerald Young

2018

- Gary Blackburn
- Jay Hadley
- Monty Hadley
- Brent Kelly
- Steven Money
- Joe and Carrie Ruiz

2017

- Darrell Christensen
- Lon Hansen
- Flip Harmon
- Vern Oyler
- Chuck Story

2016

- Marvin Dunbar
- Don Kennington
- Mary Shaw-Drake
- Norman “Shorty” Thompson
- Kenneth Woolstenhulme
- Cody Wright

2015

- Tanya McKinnon Bartlett
- Gary Cooper
- Bud Favero
- Jack Hannum
- Dean Steed
- Francisco Zamora

2014

- James W. Fain
- Ron & Ginger Brown
- Bar T Rodeo
- Dale Pendleton
- James “Jim” B. Smith
- U. Grant Speed

2013

- Archie Anderson
- The Baldwins: George Henry, Angus and George Earl
- Glen Thompson
- Earl W. Bascom
- Rose Flynt Bascom “Texas Rose”
- Vicki Vest Woodward

2012

- Cotton & Karin Rosser
- Connie Della Lucia Robinson
- Susan Merrill Agricola
- Lewis and Calvin Grant
- Kenneth “Ken” Cross
- Judy Butler Anderson
- Weber County Sheriff’s Posse
- J. G. Read
- Harman W. Peery
- Lewis Feild
- Lorene Donaldson Call

== See also ==
- List of music museums
