= Morrison–Knudsen =

American engineering company

Morrison–Knudsen Company, Inc.
- Type: Private (1912–1932); Public (1932–1996)
- Industry: Construction; Transport
- Founded: 1912
- Founder: Harry Morrison; Morris Knudsen
- Defunct: 1996; 30 years ago
- Fate: Declared bankruptcy in 1996, sold to Washington Construction Group, the brand then acquired by AECOM in 2014
- Headquarters: Boise, Idaho, U.S.
- Area served: Worldwide
- Products: Diesel locomotives
- Operating income: (1998)
- Net income: 1.86 billion
- Owner: Washington Construction Group (1996)
- Number of employees: 8,500
- Divisions: MotivePower (1972–1996)

Morrison–Knudsen (MK) was an American civil engineering and construction company, with headquarters in Boise, Idaho.

MK designed and constructed major infrastructure throughout the world and was one of the consortium of firms that built Hoover Dam, San Francisco–Oakland Bay Bridge, the Trans-Alaska Pipeline, and many other large projects of American infrastructure.

== Founders ==
MK's origins date to 1905, when Harry Morrison, Chairman and President met Morris Knudsen while working on the construction of the New York Canal (Boise Project) in southwestern Idaho. Morrison was a 20-year-old concrete superintendent for the Reclamation Service; Knudsen was a forty-something Nebraska farmer (and Danish immigrant) with a team of horses and a fresno scraper.

Their first venture together was in 1912, on a pump plant in nearby Grand View for $14,000; they lost money but gained experience. MK earned some revenue in 1914, when they constructed the Three Mile Falls Diversion Dam, south of Umatilla, Oregon. For several years, the firm built irrigation canals, logging roads, and railways; they incorporated in 1923, the year gross revenues topped $1 million. MK reached a significant milestone with its joint venture in the construction of Hoover Dam (1932–1935).

== World War II ==
During World War II, MK built airfields, storage depots, and bases throughout the Pacific, and built ships along the West Coast. Japanese forces captured 1,200 workers, including many MK employees, stationed on Midway and Wake Islands in late 1941. After the war, MK expanded into a variety of international construction fields.

== Post-war projects ==
MK won contracts for many domestic and foreign Cold War projects. It built the locks on the St. Lawrence Seaway, the Distant Early Warning Line system, also known as the DEW Line or Early Warning Line, Minuteman missile silos, NASA's Kennedy Space Center, and over 100 major dams. In 1946, King Mohammad Zahir Shah and the Kabul government tasked Morrison-Knudsen with a large array of construction tasks in Afghanistan, including irrigation and a hydroelectric dam in the Helmand Province area. Morrison was featured on the cover of Time magazine on May 3, 1954, and the article claimed Morrison was "the man who has done more than anyone else to change the face of the earth."

In the late 1950s, MK constructed the railroad causeway that spanned across the Great Salt Lake in Utah. The Lucin Cutoff causeway allowed trains to operate at full operating speeds instead of the slower speeds required to safely travel over the deteriorating wooden trestle crossing parallel to it. The causeway is estimated to have used 65 million tons of rock and gravel.

In the 1950s it was involved in the construction of the Rimutaka Tunnel in New Zealand, the longest rail tunnel in the southern hemisphere. In the wake of the Christmas flood of 1964, MK returned the Northwestern Pacific Railroad main line to operation in only 177 days. This involved building 100 miles of track, 30 miles of access roads, and three bridges. In the late 1960s and early 1970s, MK was involved in the construction of the Hamersley & Robe River and Mount Newman railways in the Pilbara region of Western Australia.

From 1962 to 1972, MK managed a joint venture to serve the U.S. military as civilian contractors for infrastructure in the Vietnam War; in 1971, they constructed 384 of the infamous "tiger cage" cells of Côn Sơn Prison. The group was called RMK-BRJ and included Raymond International, Brown & Root, and JA Jones Construction Company.

MK was also involved in the construction of rail projects such as the Bay Area Rapid Transit (BART) extension and the single track Apoera-Bakhuys Railway in Suriname (1976–1977), a part of the West Suriname Plan.

== Rail and transit ==
=== MK Rail ===
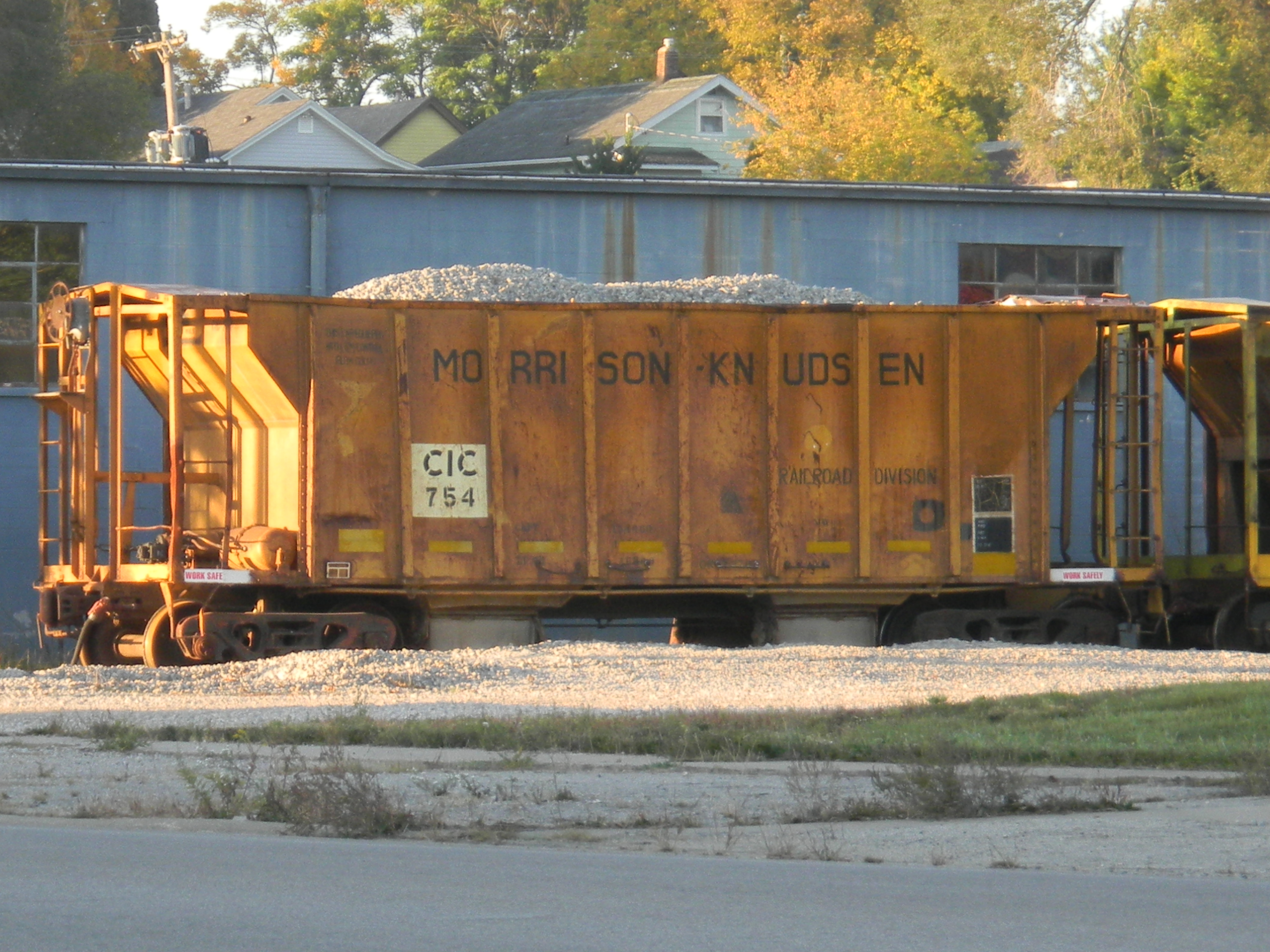
Morrison–Knudsen ballast hopper with CIC markings on the CRANDIC at Cedar Rapids, Iowa

Morrison–Knudsen established a separate rail systems division in 1972. Initially, the company rebuilt locomotives, such as the four Delaware & Hudson ALCO PAs. It rebuilt four Southern Pacific GE U25Bs with a Sulzer V-12 prime mover. These locomotives, designated M-K TE70-4S, operated from 1978 to 1987. It also built locomotives, originally under its own name and later under subsidiary MK Rail from 1994 to 1996, such as the MK5000C and the F40PHM-2C. Its Australian operation, based in Whyalla, South Australia, rebuilt 17 CL and eight AL class locomotives for Australian National and six DE class locomotives for BHP in the 1990s.

Morrison–Knudsen spun-off MK Rail in 1993; it became a publicly traded company in 1994. After Morrison–Knudsen's bankruptcy in 1996 the company renamed itself MotivePower. The company merged with Westinghouse Air Brake Company in 1999 to form Wabtec. MotivePower is now a wholly owned subsidiary of Wabtec.

=== MK Transit ===
MK also entered the passenger railcar rebuilding market in the 1980s, initially located at the former Erie Railroad shop in Hornell, New York. It overhauled and rebuilt many New York City Transit subway cars between 1984 and 1992 including all R26/R28s, all R29s, most R32s, some R36s (through a pilot program), many R42s, many R44s, and all R46s. It also overhauled NJ Transit's Arrow I series cars, converting from electric MUs to Comet 1B push-pull coaches, and SEPTA's Silverliner II and III series electric commuter cars in the late 1980s. Vehicles overhauled in the 1990s included Metra Highliner EMU cars, an Amtrak Turboliner RTL-II, as well as BTC-1C passenger cars and US Standard Light Rail Vehicles for the MBTA.

MK later expanded into building new cars, taking over the former Pullman Company factory in Chicago in 1992. The CTA 3200 series and Metro-North M6 "Cosmopolitan" cars were built by MK in 1992–1994.

After winning a contract to build 80 Bay Area Rapid Transit C2 cars, the company opened a third assembly site in Pittsburg, California, in 1993. MK also built Metra gallery cars, Amtrak Viewliner I sleeping cars, the Caltrans California Cars (1994–1996) and other rail passenger cars and light rail.

By 1995, Morrison–Knudsen was facing bankruptcy, with more than 60% of the company's previous-year net loss of $350 million occurring in the MK Transit division. A special purpose company, named Amerail (American Passenger Rail Car Company), was formed so that Morrison–Knudsen could divest itself of this loss-making division, while also allowing the remaining MK Transit contracts to be completed. The new company was funded by Morrison–Knudsen's creditors, led by the Fidelity and Deposit Company in Baltimore, and was headquartered in Chicago.

The Pittsburg site was transferred to Adtranz in December 1995, following completion of the BART C2 cars. After this transfer, the site was used for overhaul of the older BART A and B cars. Morrison–Knudsen had also bid on this contract, but lost out to AEG Transportation Systems (who were then acquired by Daimler-Benz, becoming part of Adtranz shortly after). The Hornell site was bought by GEC-Alsthom in July 1997, following unsuccessful attempts at a joint venture to bid on new contracts. The final site in Chicago closed in mid-1998, when work on contracts for Metra was completed.

== Financial difficulty ==
In 1991, MK purchased a 49% shareholding in New Zealand construction contractor McConnell Dowell.

By the 1990s, Morrison–Knudsen had been led into some risky non-core areas by Boise native William Agee, who became CEO in 1988 and was ousted by the board of directors in February 1995. MK had announced a loss of $310 million for fiscal year 1994, and a leak of an intended Agee resignation drew broad media attention which resulted in Agee resigning earlier than originally planned. The company had been in financial difficulty for several years, and declared bankruptcy that same year. It was purchased by Washington Group in 1996 for $380 million.

== Additional growth ==
For several years after the 1996 merger, the company continued as Morrison–Knudsen. Growth by acquisition brought it into the top tier (by size) of American construction firms. In 1999, MK acquired the government-services operations of Westinghouse Electric Company, becoming a science and technology services leader.

The company expanded its market leadership in 2000 by acquiring Raytheon Engineers & Constructors, which owned engineering giant Rust International of Birmingham, Alabama, to produce one of the largest companies in the industry.

== End ==
Following the acquisition, the MK's corporate name changed to Washington Group International in July 2000. Issues with the Raytheon acquisition caused WGI to declare bankruptcy in 2001 – virtually eliminating all shareholder value, but later successfully exited it.

WGI was acquired by rival URS Corporation of San Francisco in 2007, which was acquired by AECOM of Los Angeles in 2014. With a greatly diminished presence in Idaho, the last positions in Boise were eliminated in 2015.

== Bibliography ==
- "Idaho for the Curious", by Cort Conley, ©1982, ISBN 0-9603566-3-0, p. 403–404
- Lustig, David (May 2003). "Whatever happened to SP's 'Popsicles'?". Trains. 63 (5): 23. ISSN 0041-0934.
- The Wreck of Morrison Knudsen – Time, April 3, 1995
- Idaho company recovers – Seattle Times, (AP), July 28, 2004
