= Utah Railway =

Class III railroad operating in Utah and Colorado

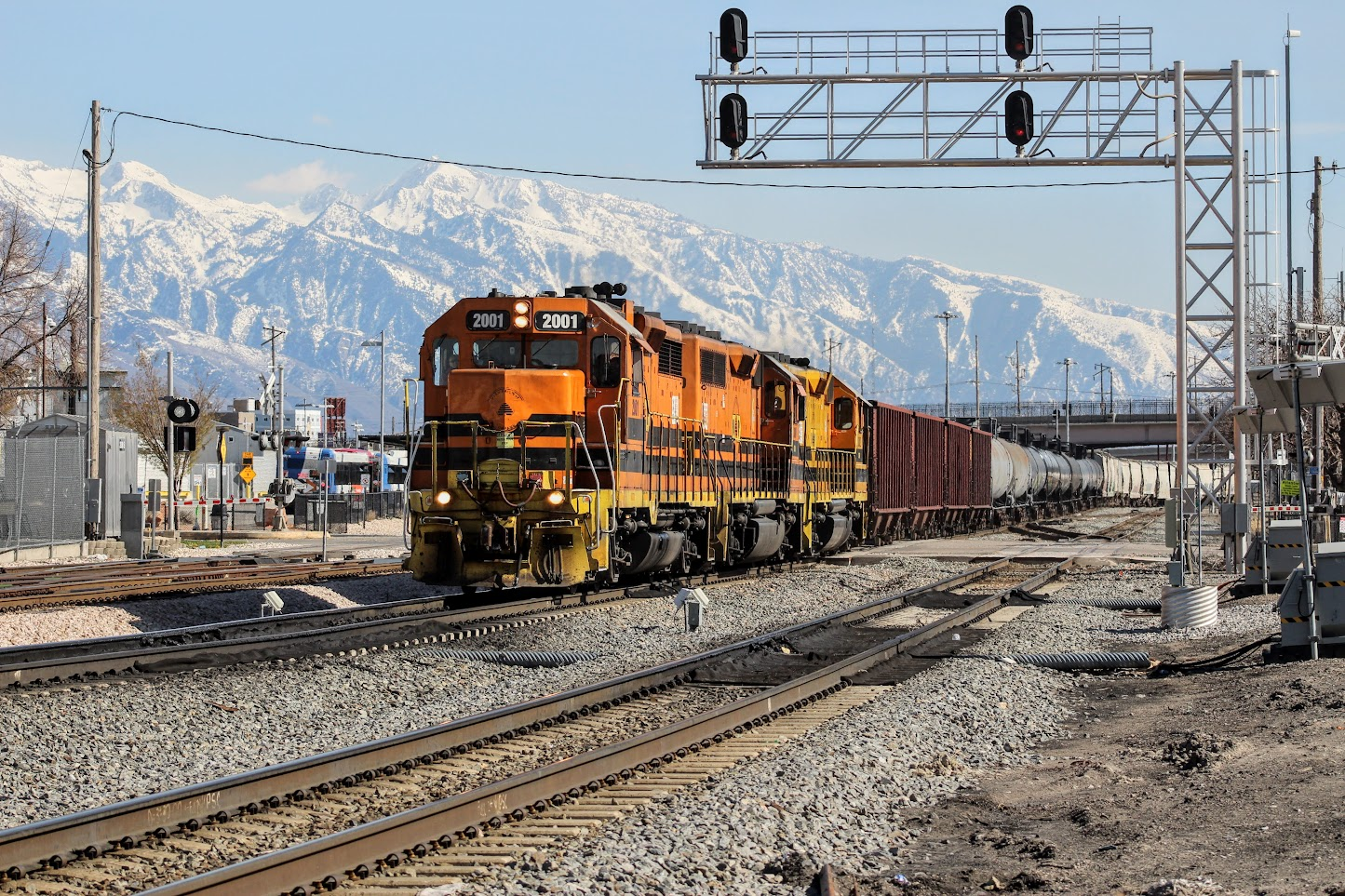

Overview
- Headquarters: Provo, Utah
- Reporting mark: UTAH
- Locale: Utah and Colorado
- Dates of operation: 1912–present

Technical
- Track gauge: 4 ft 8 1/2 in (1,435 mm) standard gauge

The Utah Railway (reporting mark UTAH) is a class III railroad operating in Utah and Colorado, and owned by Genesee & Wyoming Inc.

== History ==
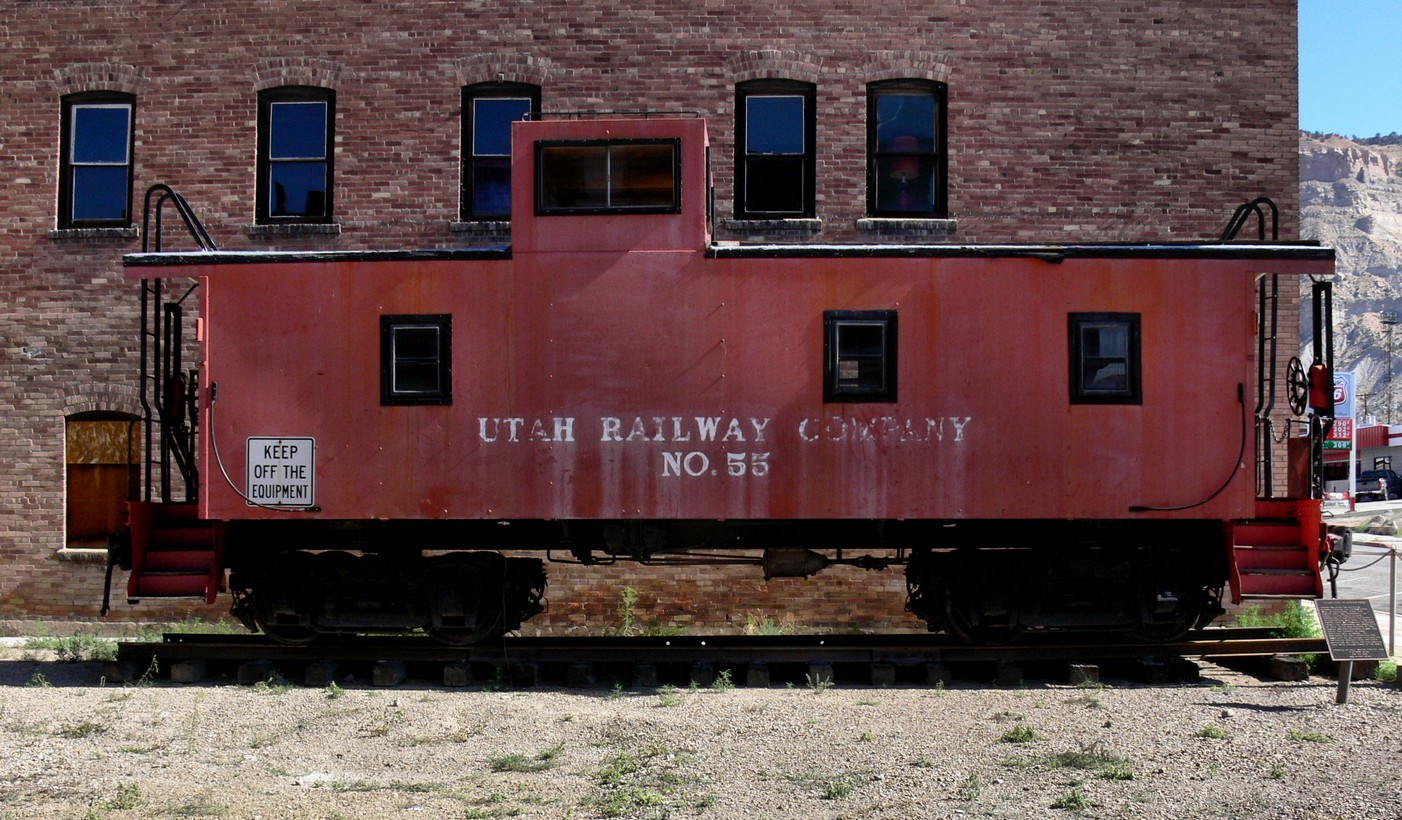
Former Union Pacific CA-1 Caboose on display in Helper. The Utah Railway purchased eight of these cabooses from the UP between 1918 and 1927.

The Utah Railway Company was incorporated on January 24, 1912, with the name of Utah Coal Railway, shortened to Utah Railway in May of the same year. It was founded to haul coal from the company's mines to Provo, Utah, in reaction to company disappointment in the service and route of the existing Denver and Rio Grande Railroad nearby. It was known for owning the most modern equipment; when built, its large "Santa Fe" (2-10-2) and "Mallet" (2-6-6-2) steam locomotives had automatic stokers, a new invention at the time, and a convenience that drew many firemen from the D&RGW's Utah Division to the Utah Railway in 1917 when that line opened. In addition, the Utah Railway was the first to equip its air brakes with fourteen-pound tension springs instead of the standard seven-pound springs. The company was one of the earliest coal hauling railroads to employ diesel locomotives, and was early to adopt automation technologies, including the use of flashing rear end devices instead of cabooses. The Utah Railway's freight car roster consisted of fifteen flatcars and about 2,000 drop-bottom gondolas jointly owned with the San Pedro, Los Angeles & Salt Lake Railroad (later LA&SL), painted with "Utah Coal Route" lettering and UCR reporting marks. These gondolas were known to the railroad's employees as "Battleships". Parent company Mueller Industries, a manufacturer of copper products, sold the Utah Railway in 2002 to Genesee & Wyoming Inc., a railroad holding company.

== Current operations ==
Today's Utah Railway operates over 423 miles (681 km) of track between Grand Junction, Colorado, and Provo, Utah, of which 45 miles (72 km) are owned, and the remainder operated under agreements with BNSF Railway and Union Pacific. As of January 2017, the company no longer hauls coal. The Utah Railway also owns a subsidiary railroad, the Salt Lake City Southern Railroad, serving over 30 customers on over 25 miles (40 km) of track between Salt Lake City and Draper, Utah. In addition, switching services are provided in Ogden and elsewhere.

As of 2023, Genesee & Wyoming holds 59 miles. The Utah Railway interchanges in multiple locations: with BNSF and Union Pacific in Provo, Utah and Grand Junction, Colorado. It can handle railcars of up to 286,000 pounds gross weight.

== Logo ==
The earliest logo was simply the words "Utah Railway Company", spelled out on the locomotives and cabooses, and "Utah Coal Route" on the drop-bottom gondolas. On paper, however, the logo for many years was a black circle with a white background. The wording and image in these circular logos changed over the years. The 1948 logo included the words "Utah Railway" surrounding a gondola with the initials "U.C.R.". The 1999 logo was an oval with an image of an SD diesel locomotive and the words "Utah Railway: Since 1912". In later years the symbol of the Utah Railway Company was the beehive, which is also the Utah state symbol. GWI alters the corporate logos of its acquisitions to match the parent company's logo, and as such, the beehive was retained within a logo similar to the parent company's design.
