= Class 5 =

Class 5 may refer to:

- A5-class customs vessels
- Class 5 telephone switch
- Class V (U.S. Army), ammunition of all types, and associated items
- G-5-class motor torpedo boat
- JKOY Class Sm5, Helsinki electric multiple unit
- Sa'ar 5-class corvette
- SCORE Class 5, off-road racing Baja Bug
- S5-class submarine
- TS Class 5, tram type used in Trondheim, Norway
- U-5-class submarine (Austria-Hungary)
- The fifth class in terms of hiking difficulty in the Yosemite Decimal System
- Class 5 truck, US truck class for medium trucks, up to 19,500 pounds weight limit

== Locomotives ==
- Baltimore and Ohio Railroad EL-5 class
- BR Standard Class 5, British 4-6-0 steam locomotive
  - BR Standard Class 5 73096
  - BR Standard Class 5 73156
- Chicago, Burlington and Quincy O-5 class
- G&SWR 5 Class
- GCR Class 5
- GCR Class 5A
- Indian locomotive class WAG-5
- Indian locomotive class WAP-5
- Indian locomotive class WDG-5
- NSB El 5, Norwegian electric locomotive
- NSB Di 5, Norwegian diesel locomotive
- KUR EC5 class
- L&YR Class 5, British 2-4-2T steam locomotive
- LB&SCR E5 class
- LMS Stanier Class 5 4-6-0
  - LMS Stanier Class 5 4-6-0 4932
- LMS Stanier Mogul
- LNER Class K5
- New Haven class I-5
- NSB Class 5, Norwegian standard-gauge steam locomotive
- NSB Class V, Norwegian narrow-gauge steam locomotive
- Pennsylvania Railroad class A5s
- Pennsylvania Railroad class G5
- Pennsylvania Railroad class K5
- Pennsylvania Railroad class L5
- Pennsylvania Railroad class P5
- Southern Pacific class AC-5
- Southern Pacific class GS-5
- SP&S Class L-5

== See also ==
- Class V (disambiguation)
- Class 05 (disambiguation)
- Type 5 (disambiguation)
