= Category 5 =

Category 5 may refer to:

- Category 5 (album), an album from rock band, FireHouse
- Category 5 cable, used for carrying data
- Category 5 computer virus, as classified by Symantec Corporation
- Category 5 Records, a record label
- Category 5 tropical cyclone, on any of the Tropical cyclone intensity scales
  - Any of several hurricanes listed at List of Category 5 Atlantic hurricanes or List of Category 5 Pacific hurricanes
- Category 5 pandemic, on the pandemic severity index, an American influenza pandemic with a case-fatality ratio of 2% or higher
- Category 5 winter storm, on the Northeast snowfall impact scale and the Regional snowfall index
  - Any of several winter storms listed at List of Northeast snowfall impact scale winter storms and List of regional snowfall index category 5 winter storms

== See also ==
- Category V (disambiguation)
- Class 5 (disambiguation)
- Group 5 (disambiguation)
- Type 5 (disambiguation)
