= Category V =

Category V can refer to:

- Category V New Testament manuscripts - Byzantine
- Category V planetary protection
- Category V protected areas (IUCN) - Landscape/Seascape
- Category V Armed Forces Qualification Test scores - 0–9
- Category V vintage car condition - Good

== See also ==
- Class V (disambiguation) - class/category equivalence (for labeling)
- Group V - group/category equivalence (for labeling)
- Category 5 (disambiguation) - Roman/Arabic numbering equivalence
