= EAR 56 class =

East African Railways 56 class
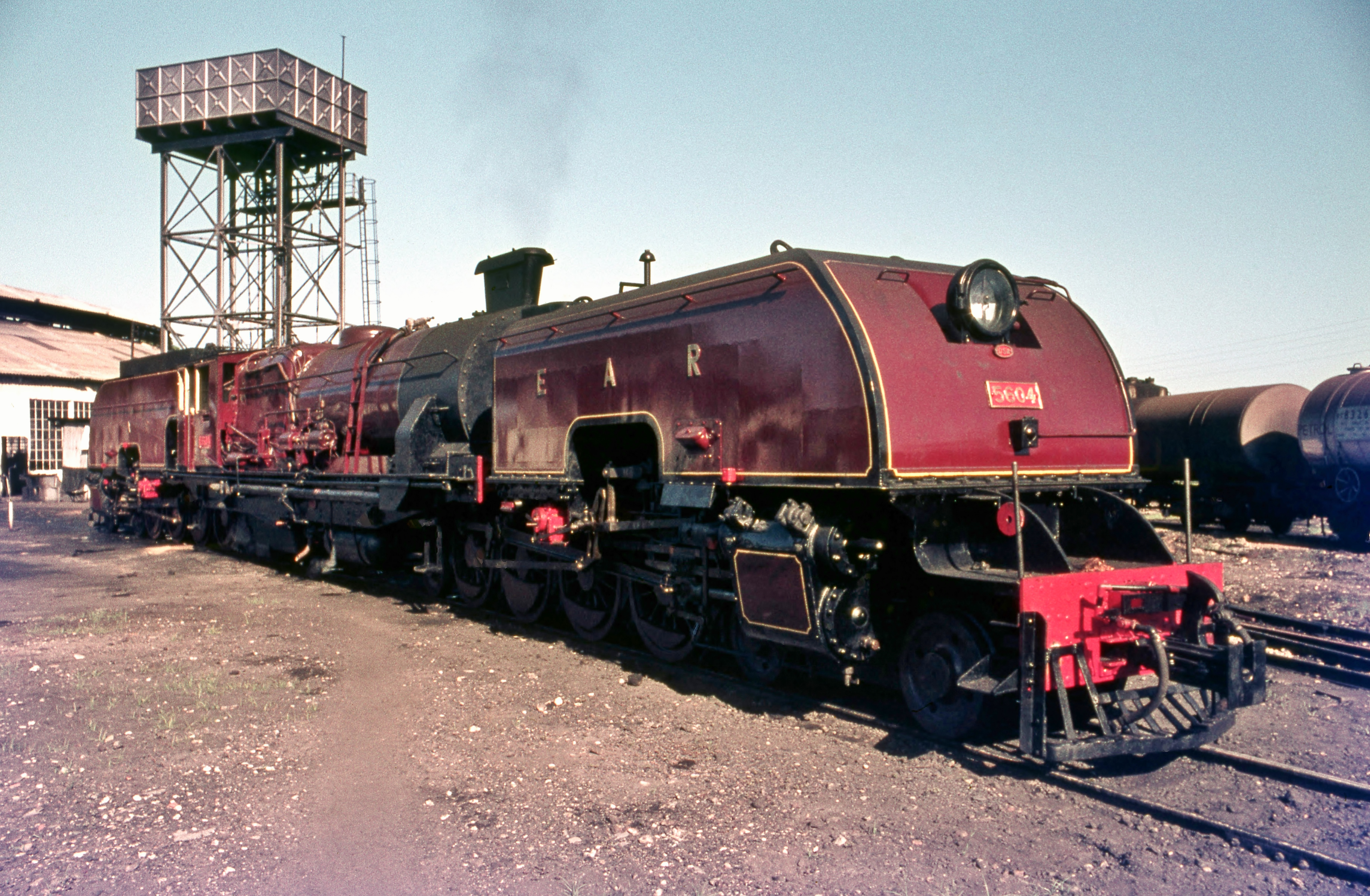
- No. 5604 at Dar es Salaam depot, Tanzania, in 1968
Type and origin
- Power type: Steam
- Builder: Beyer, Peacock & Co.
- Serial number: 7280–7285
- Build date: 1949
- Total produced: 6
Specifications
- Configuration
  - Whyte: 4-8-2+2-8-4 (Garratt)
  - UIC: (2′D1′)(1′D2′) h4
- Gauge: 1,000 mm (3 ft 3 3/8 in)
- Driver dia.: 48 in (1,219 mm)
- Adhesive weight: 88 long tons (89 t)
- Loco weight: 146.8 long tons (149.2 t)
- Fuel type: Oil
- Fuel capacity: 2,382 imp gal (10,830 L; 2,861 US gal)
- Water cap.: 4,200 imp gal (19,000 L; 5,000 US gal)
- Firebox
  - Grate area: 48.8 sq ft (4.53 m^{2})
- Boiler pressure: 200 psi (1.38 MPa)
- Heating surface
  - Firebox: 164 sq ft (15.2 m^{2})
  - Tubes: 1,753 sq ft (162.9 m^{2})
  - Total surface: 2,287 sq ft (212.5 m^{2})
- Superheater
  - Type: Inside
  - Heating area: 370 sq ft (34 m^{2})
- Cylinders: 4 (Garratt)
- Cylinder size: 16 in × 24 in (406 mm × 610 mm)
- Valve gear: Walschaerts
- Loco brake: Westinghouse type
- Train brakes: Westinghouse type
Performance figures
- Tractive effort: 43,520 lbf (193.59 kN)
Career
- Operators: East African Railways (EAR)
- Class: EC6 class; 56 class
- Number in class: 6
- Numbers: EC6 class: 122–127; 56 class: 5601–5606
- First run: 1949
- Disposition: All scrapped

The EAR 56 class was a class of 1,000 mm (3 ft 3 3/8 in) gauge 4-8-2+2-8-4 Garratt-type articulated steam locomotives built by Beyer, Peacock & Co. in Gorton, Manchester, England, in 1949. The six members of the class were ordered by the Kenya-Uganda Railway (KUR) immediately after World War II, and were a slightly modified version of the KUR's existing EC5 class.

By the time the new locomotives were built and entered service, the KUR had been succeeded by the East African Railways (EAR), which designated them for a very short time as its EC6 class, but then, as part of a comprehensive reclassification of all of its locomotives, redesignated them as its 56 class.

== Class list ==
The builder's and fleet numbers of each member of the class were as follows:

Builder's number	EC6 class number	56 class number	Notes
7280	122	5601	
7281	123	5602	
7282	124	5603	
7283	125	5604	
7284	126	5605	
7285	127	5606	

== See also ==
- Rail transport in Kenya
- Rail transport in Tanzania
- Rail transport in Uganda
