= J62 =

J62 may refer to:

- HMS Saltash (J62), a minesweeper of the Royal Navy
- LNER Class J62, a British steam locomotive class
- Metabidiminished icosahedron, A Johnson solid with the designation $J_{62}$
