= Chicago, Burlington and Quincy Railroad =

Former railroad in the midwestern United States

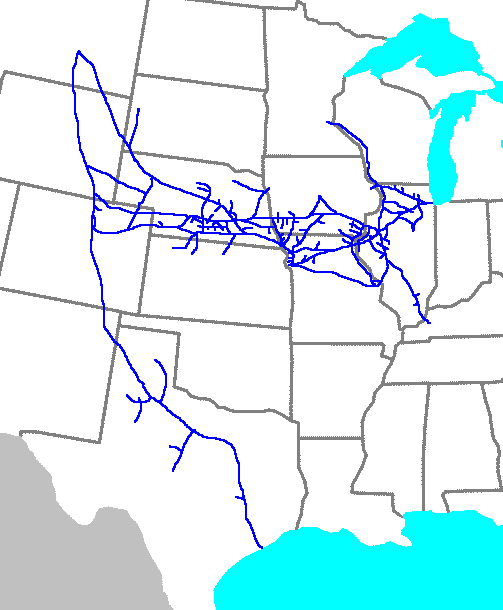
- Burlington Route system map

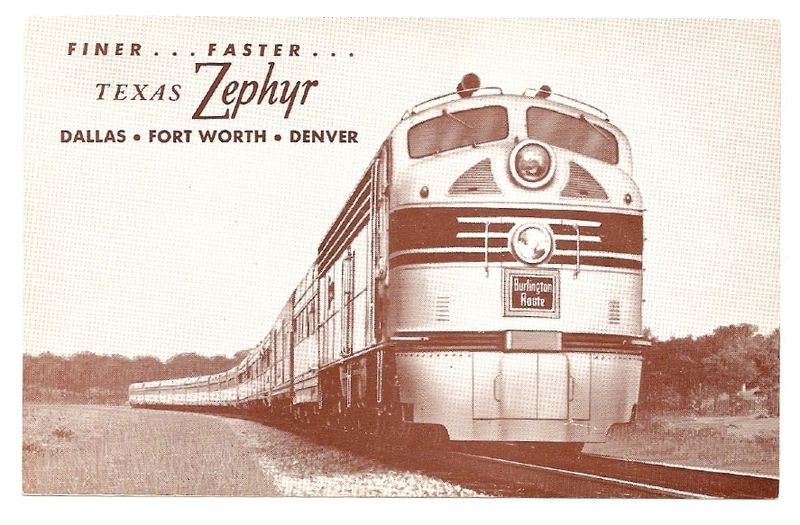
- Texas Zephyr postcard

Overview
- Headquarters: Chicago, Illinois
- Founders: John Murray Forbes; James Frederick Joy
- Reporting mark: CBQ
- Locale: Colorado, Illinois, Iowa, Kansas, Kentucky, Minnesota, Missouri, Montana, Nebraska, New Mexico, South Dakota, Texas, Wisconsin, and Wyoming
- Dates of operation: 1855–1970
- Successor: Burlington Northern Railroad; BNSF

Technical
- Track gauge: 4 ft 8 1/2 in (1,435 mm) standard gauge
- Length: 12,000 mi (19,000 km)

The Chicago, Burlington and Quincy Railroad (reporting mark CBQ) commonly referred to as the Burlington Route, the Burlington, CB&Q, or as the Q was an American railroad that operated from 1855 to 1970 in the Midwestern United States in the states of Colorado, Illinois, Iowa, Missouri, Nebraska, Wisconsin, Wyoming, and also in Texas through subsidiaries Colorado and Southern Railway (C&S), Fort Worth and Denver Railway (FW&D), and Burlington-Rock Island Railroad. Its primary connections included Chicago, Minneapolis–Saint Paul, St. Louis, Kansas City, and Denver. Because of this extensive trackage in the midwest and mountain states, the railroad used the advertising slogans "Everywhere West", "Way of the Zephyrs", and "The Way West".

In 1967, it reported 19,565 million net ton-miles of revenue freight and 723 million passenger miles; corresponding totals for C&S were 1,100 and 10 and for FW&D were 1,466 and 13. At the end of the year, CB&Q operated 8,538 route-miles, C&S operated 708, and FW&D operated 1,362 (these totals may or may not include the former Burlington-Rock Island Railroad). In 1970, it merged with the Northern Pacific Railway and the Great Northern Railway to form the Burlington Northern Railroad.

== History ==
=== 1848–1882 ===
The earliest predecessor of the Chicago, Burlington and Quincy, the Aurora Branch Railroad, was chartered by act of the Illinois General Assembly on October 2, 1848. The charter was obtained by citizens of Aurora and Batavia, Illinois, who were concerned that the Galena and Chicago Union Railroad would bypass their towns in favor of West Chicago on its route; at the time, that was the only line running west from Chicago. The Aurora Branch was built from Aurora, through Batavia, to Turner Junction in what is now West Chicago. The line was built with old strap rail and minimal, if any, grading. Using a leased locomotive and cars, the Aurora Branch ran passenger and freight trains from Aurora to Chicago via its own line from Aurora to Turner Junction and one of the G&CU's two tracks east from there to Chicago. The G&CU required the Aurora Branch to turn over 70 percent of their revenue per ton-mile handled on that railroad; as a result, in the mid-1850s, surveys were ordered to determine the best route for a railroad line to Chicago.

The line from Aurora to Chicago was built through the fledgling towns of Naperville, Lisle, Downers Grove, Hinsdale, Berwyn, and the west side of Chicago. It was opened in 1864, and passenger and freight service began. Regular commuter train service started in 1864 and remains operational to this day, making it the oldest surviving regular passenger service in Chicago. Both the original Chicago line, and to a much lesser extent, the old Aurora Branch right of way, are still in regular use today by the Burlington's present successor BNSF Railway.

The company was renamed Chicago and Aurora Railroad on June 22, 1852, and given expanded powers to extend from Aurora to a point north of LaSalle; this extension, to Mendota, was completed on October 20, 1853. Another amendment, passed February 28, 1854, authorized the company to build east from Aurora to Chicago via Naperville, and changed its name to Chicago and Southwestern Railroad. The latter provision was never acted upon, and was repealed by an act of February 14, 1855, which instead reorganized the line as the Chicago, Burlington and Quincy Railroad. The new railroad was formed by the consolidation of the Chicago and Aurora Railroad, the Central Military Tract, the west end of the Peoria & Oquawka, and the Northern Cross Railroad companies. With a steady acquisition of locomotives, cars, equipment, and trackage, the Burlington Route was able to enter the trade markets in 1862. From that year to date, the railroad and its successors have paid dividends continuously, and never run into debt or defaulted on a loan—the only Class I U.S. railroad for which this is true.

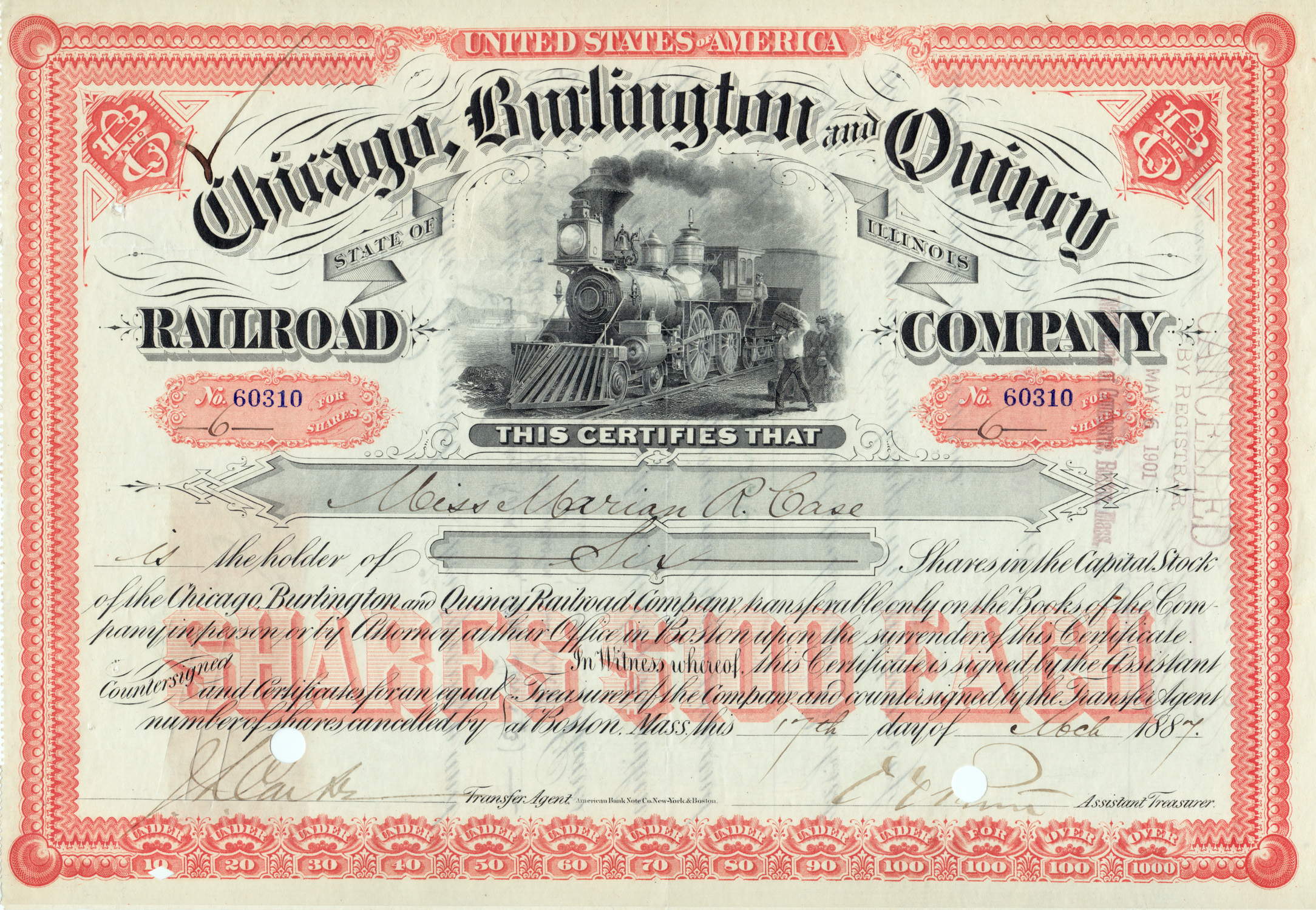

After extensive trackwork was planned, the Aurora Branch changed its name to the Chicago and Aurora Railroad in June 1852, and to Chicago, Burlington, and Quincy Railroad in 1856, and shortly reached its two other namesake cities, Burlington, Iowa, and Quincy, Illinois. In 1868 CB&Q completed bridges over the Mississippi River at both Burlington and Quincy, giving the railroad through connections with the Burlington and Missouri River Railroad (B&MR) in Iowa and the Hannibal & St. Joseph Railroad (H&StJ) in Missouri. In 1860 the H&SJ carried the mail to the Pony Express upon reaching the Missouri River at St. Joseph, Missouri. In 1862 The first Railway Post Office was inaugurated on the H&StJ to sort mail on the trains way across Missouri.

The B&MR continued building west into Nebraska as a separate company, the Burlington & Missouri River Rail Road, founded in 1869. During the summer of 1870 it reached Lincoln, the newly designated capital of Nebraska and by 1872 it reached Kearney, Nebraska. That same year the B&MR across Iowa was absorbed by the CB&Q. By the time the Missouri River bridge at Plattsmouth, Nebraska, was completed the B&MR in Nebraska was well on its way to Denver. That same year, the Nebraska B&MR was purchased by the CB&Q, which completed the line to Denver by 1882.

Early repair shops for rolling stock were built by the Aurora Branch Railroad in Chicago, but the first true shop site was established at Aurora, Illinois in 1855. These were capable of repairing and building locomotives, freight cars, and passenger cars. Other shop sites were established or inherited from predecessor lines as the system grew. By the early 1900s, the shops at Aurora served the Chicago Division, the shops in Galesburg, Illinois served the Galesburg Division, the shops in Hannibal, Missouri served the St. Louis Division, the shops in West Burlington, Iowa and in Creston, Iowa served the Iowa Division, and the shops in Denver, Colorado served the McCook and Red Cloud Divisions. The latter were the final steam era shops built for the CB&Q, completed in 1922.

=== 1882–1901 ===
Burlington's rapid expansion after the American Civil War was based upon sound financial management, dominated by John Murray Forbes of Boston and assisted by Charles Elliott Perkins. Perkins was a powerful administrator who eventually forged a system out of previously loosely held affiliates, virtually tripling Burlington's size during his presidency from 1881 to 1901.

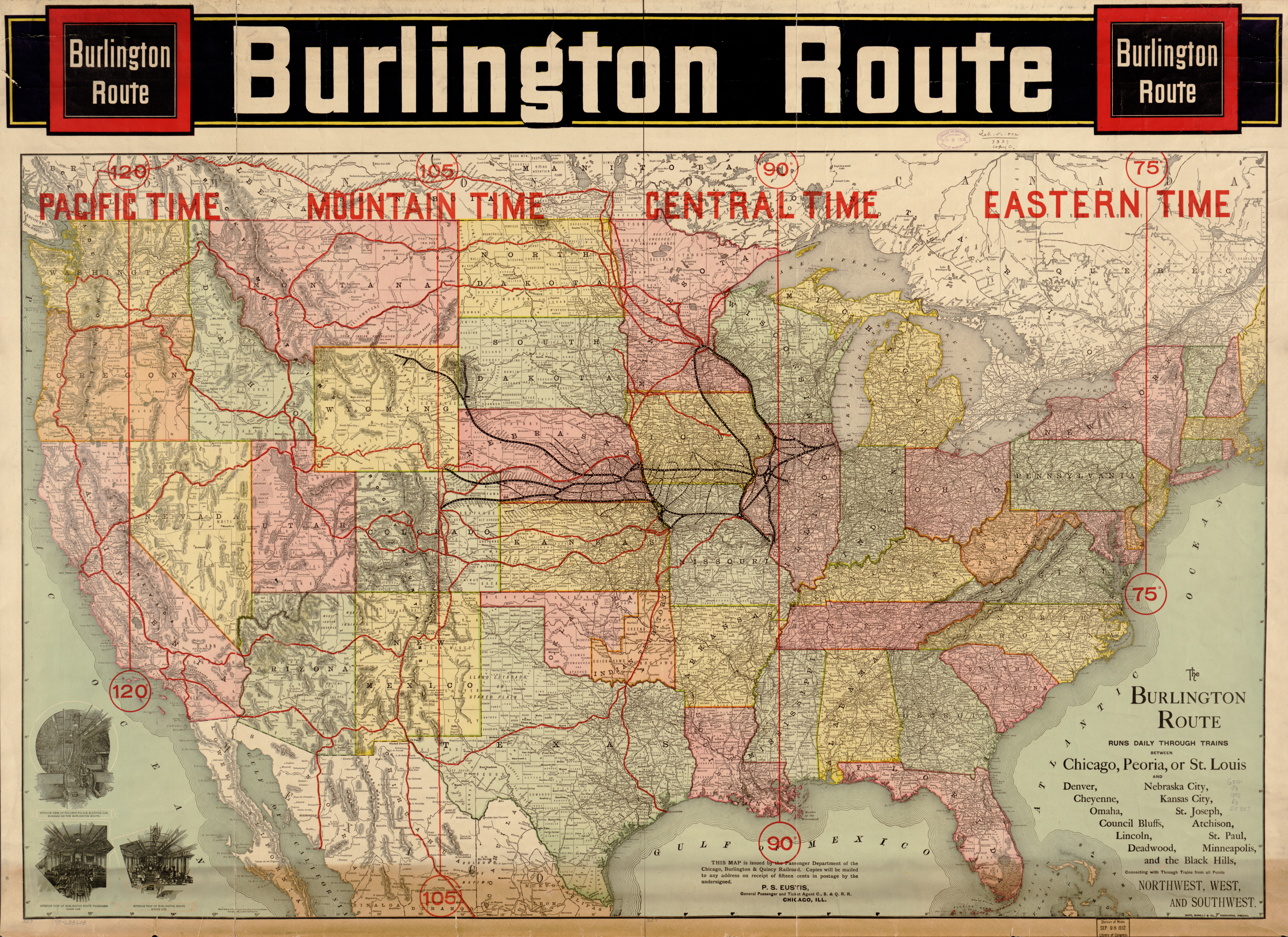
Burlington Route system map, 1892. Burlington lines are black; connecting railroads are red.

Ultimately, Perkins believed the Burlington Railroad must be included into a powerful transcontinental system. Though the railroad stretched as far west as Denver and Billings, Montana, it had failed to reach the Pacific Coast during the 1880s and 1890s, when construction was less expensive. Though approached by E. H. Harriman of the Union Pacific Railroad, Perkins felt his railroad was a more natural fit with James J. Hill's Great Northern Railway. With its river line to the Twin Cities, the Burlington Route formed a natural connection between Hill's home town (and headquarters) of St. Paul, Minnesota, and the railroad hub of Chicago. Moreover, Hill was willing to meet Perkins' $200-a-share asking price for the Burlington's stock. By 1900, Hill's Great Northern, in conjunction with the Northern Pacific Railway, held nearly 100 percent of Burlington's stock.

By 1899, the company had rostered 1,205 locomotives, 936 passenger cars and 40,720 freight cars.

In 1901, a rebuffed Harriman tried to gain an indirect influence over the Burlington by launching a stock raid on the Northern Pacific. Though Hill managed to fend off this attack on his nascent system, it led to the creation of the Northern Securities Company, and later, the Northern Securities Co. v. United States ruling by the U.S. Supreme Court.

==== Burlington strike of 1888 ====
The only major strike in the line's history came in 1888, the Burlington railway strike of 1888. Unlike most strikes, which were based on unskilled workers, this one was based on the highly skilled well-paid engineers and firemen, a challenge to management prerogatives. A settlement would have been much cheaper, but President Perkins was determined to assert ownership rights and destroy the union threat. The fight dragged on 10 months before the financially and emotionally exhausted strikers finally gave up, and Perkins declared a total victory. However, he had spent heavily on strikebreakers, lawsuits, and police protection, hurting the balance sheets and putting the railroad in a poor position to face the nationwide depression of the Panic of 1893.

=== 1901–1945 ===
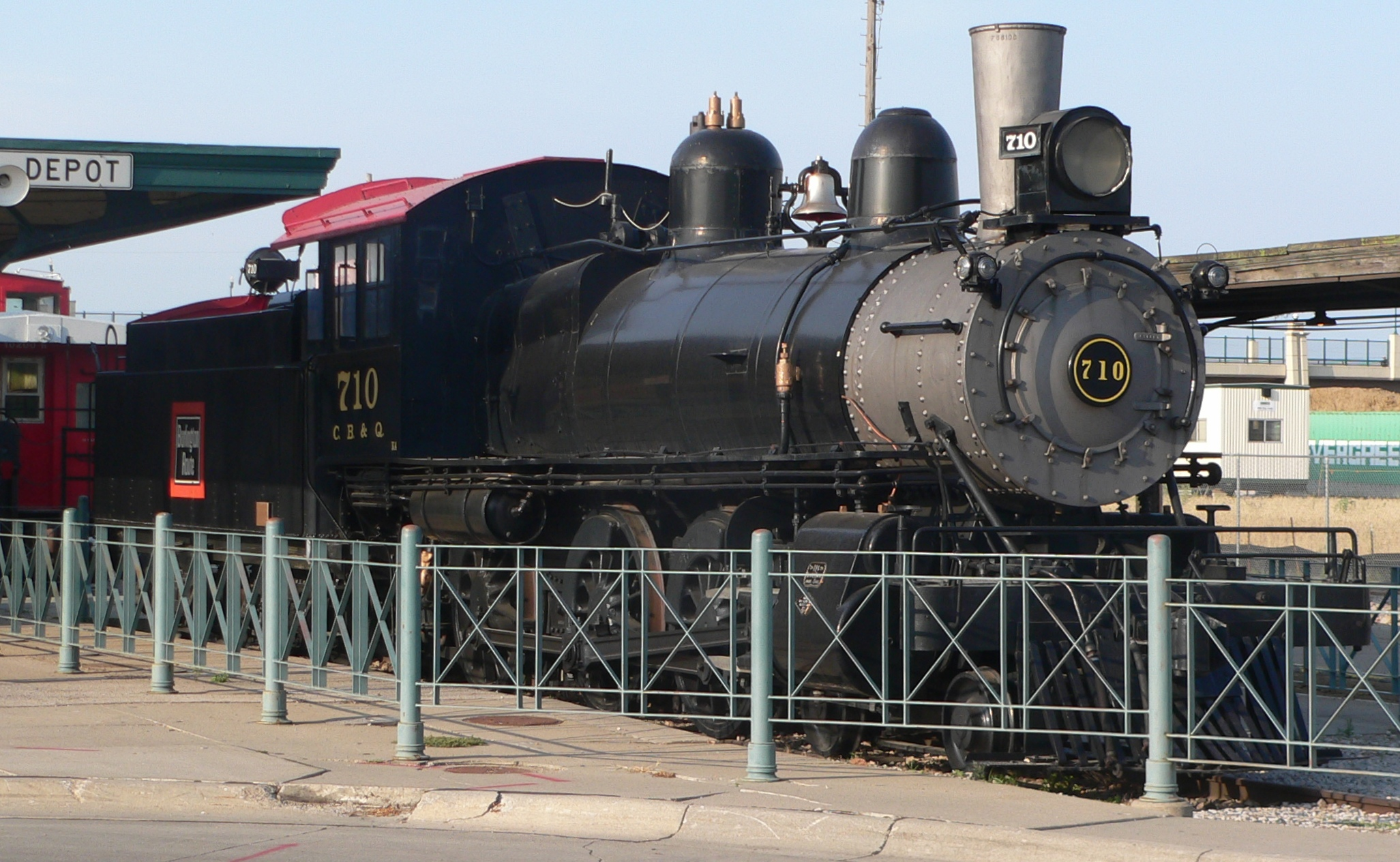
Chicago, Burlington and Quincy 4-6-0 locomotive No. 710 on static display at Iron Horse Park.

Following the purchase of the Burlington by GN and NP, expansion continued. In 1908, the CB&Q purchased both the Colorado and Southern Railway and the Fort Worth and Denver Railway, giving it access south to Dallas and the Gulf of Mexico ports in Houston and Galveston. It also extended its reach south in the Mississippi Valley region by opening up a new line from Concord, Illinois, south to Paducah, Kentucky. It was during this period that the Burlington was at its largest, exceeding just over 12,000 route miles in 14 states by the 1920s. With the First World War having the same effect on the railroad as on all other railroads, during the 1920s, the Burlington Route had an increasingly heavy amount of equipment flooding the yards. With the advent of the Great Depression, the CB&Q held a good portion of this for scrap.

In 1929, the CB&Q created a subsidiary, the Burlington Transportation Company, to operate intercity buses in tandem with its railway network. On January 1, 1932, the CB&Q received a new president; former Great Northern Railroad president Ralph Budd. By which time, the CB&Q was facing a decline in passenger ridership from the Depression, and U.S. President Franklin D. Roosevelt was exploring ways to help the rail industry improve. Ralph Budd subsequently asked for a streamlined stainless-steel train to be built, and this resulted in the railroad introducing the famous Zephyrs. As early as 1897, the railroad invested in alternatives to steam power, namely, internal-combustion engines. The railroad's shops in Aurora had built a three-horsepower distillate motor in that year, but it was not reliable (requiring a massive 6,000-pound flywheel), and it had issues with overheating (even with the best metals of the day, its cylinder heads and liners would warp and melt in a matter of minutes), so it was therefore deemed impractical. Diesel engines of that era were large, cumbersome and impractical, and were best suited for low-speed, continuous operation.

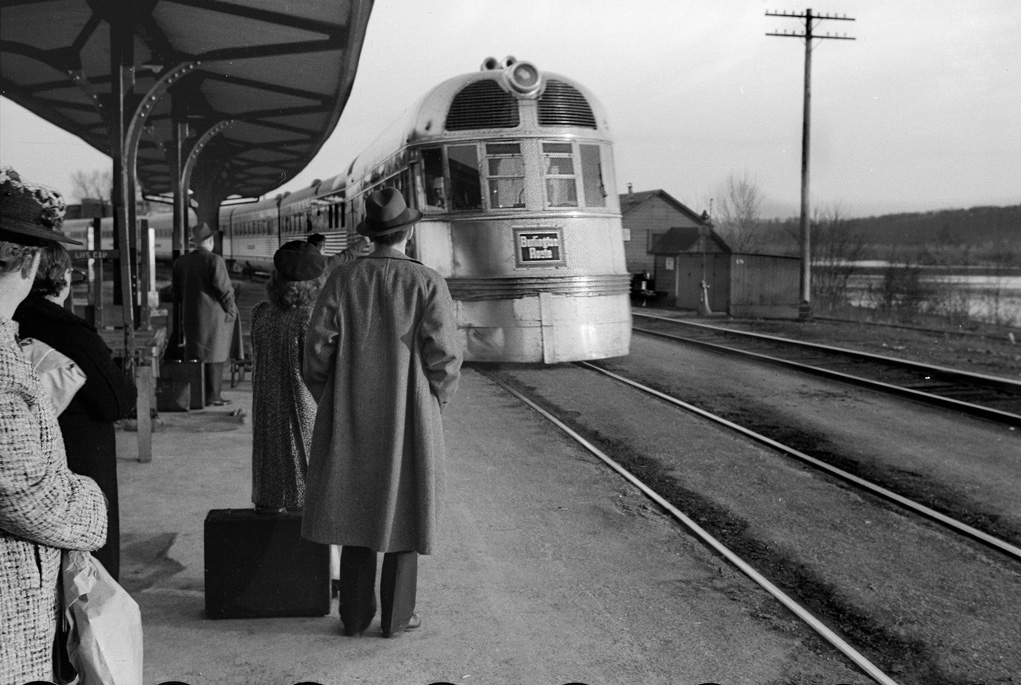
A Zephyr arriving at East Dubuque, Illinois

It was not reliable for a railroad locomotive; there was no diesel engine suitable for that purpose then. Always innovating, the railroad purchased "doodlebug" gas-electric combine cars from Electro-Motive Corporation (EMC) and built their own, sending them out to do the jobs of a steam locomotive and a single car. After the positive results the doodlebug cars created, and after having purchased and used three General Electric steeple-cab switchers powered by distillate engines, Ralph Budd requested the Winton Engine Company to design and construct a light, powerful diesel engine that could stand the rigors of continuous, unattended daily service.

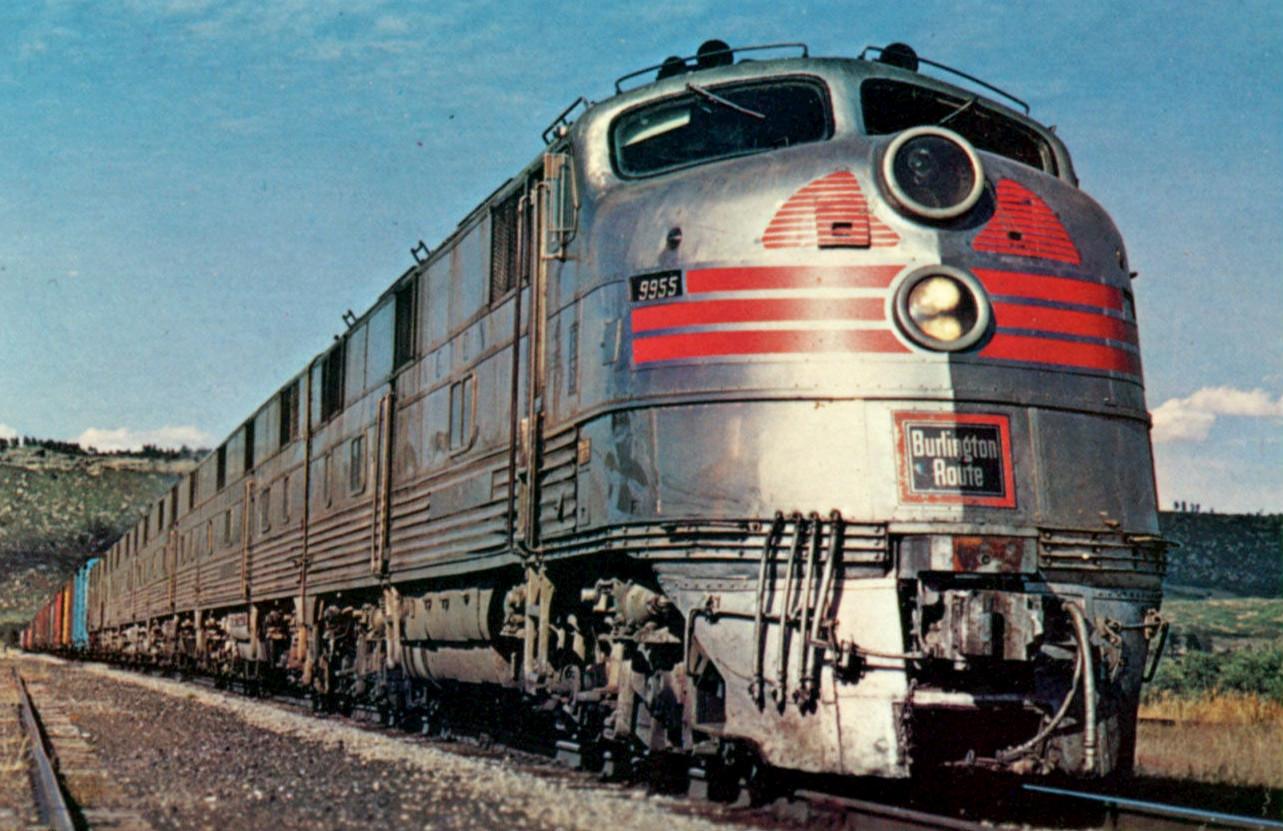
Burlington locomotive hauling an express freight c. 1967. These locomotives were also used for the Zephyr passenger trains.

The experiences of developing these engines can be summed up shortly by General Motors Research vice-president Charles Kettering: "I do not recall any trouble with the dip stick." Ralph Budd, accused of gambling on diesel power, chirped that "I knew that the GM people were going to see the program through to the very end. Actually, I wasn't taking a gamble at all." The manifestation of this gamble was the eight-cylinder Winton 8-201A engine that powered the Burlington Zephyr (built 1934) on its record-breaking run, and it opened the door for developing the long line of diesel engines that has powered Electro-Motive locomotives for the next seventy years. In 1936, the CB&Q would become one of the founding members of the Trailways Transportation System, and still provides intercity service to this day as Burlington Trailways.

1940 was the final year the CB&Q added steam locomotives to their roster, having completed construction on their O-5A class locomotives at the West Burlington, Iowa shops. With their freight traffic weighing 31 million tons that year, the CB&Q saw no further necessity for any more steam or diesel locomotives to be added to their roster. In 1942, following the United States' entrance into World War II, the railroad's freight traffic increased to 49 million tons, with Ralph Budd (now named President Roosevelt's federal transportation commissioner) poised to ensure his company would help the war effort. In 1943, the War Production Board authorized EMC (now reincorporated as EMD) to construct sixteen FT locomotives for delivery to the CB&Q the following year, by which time, the road's freight traffic peaked 57 million tons.

=== 1945–1970 ===
After World War II ended, the CB&Q began ordering additional diesel locomotives from EMD, as part of a $140-million program to dieselize their roster. August 31, 1949, was Ralph Budd's final day as president of the railroad before he would retire during that year's Chicago Railroad Fair, and Harry C. Murphy succeeded him in September. Dieselization of the CB&Q's commercial passenger operations was completed on September 26, 1952, when the last of the 4-6-2 locomotives that operated for the Chicago-Aurora suburban service were retired; the remaining steam locomotives on the CB&Q were primarily reassigned as freight haulers and yard switchers.

The final division on the CB&Q to be fully dieselized was the Beardstown Division in Southern Illinois, where 2-8-2 locomotive No. 4997 worked the last revenue steam assignment for the railroad at Herrin Junction on January 27, 1959. The only major U.S. railroads to operate revenue steam after this date were the Union Pacific, Illinois Central, Nickel Plate Road, Norfolk and Western, Grand Trunk Western, Duluth, Missabe and Iron Range, and Lake Superior and Ishpeming.

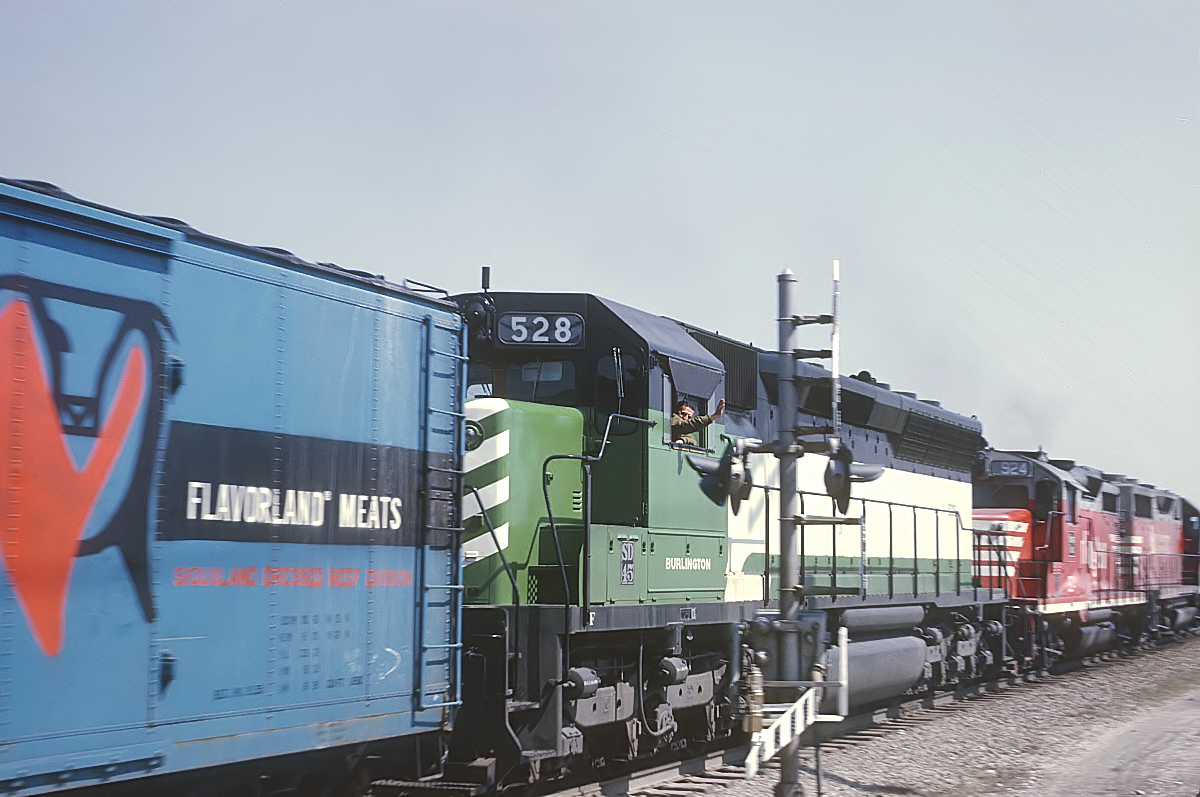
CB&Q 528, a brand-new EMD SD45 in 1969, with an experimental paint scheme that would later be adopted by the Burlington Northern the following year, albeit in a different form

On July 1, 1965, Harry Murphy retired from his position as president of the CB&Q (he remained on the railroad as a director until October), and former Frisco Railway president Louis W. Menk took over as president and CEO. During his presidency, Louis Menk explored ways to reduce costs for the CB&Q's passenger operations and to reshape the road's freight operations. Passenger service was markedly reduced, as people had shifted to using private automobiles for transportation. In late 1966, Louis Menk became president of the Northern Pacific, leaving William John Quinn in charge of the CB&Q.

As the financial situation of American railroading continued to decline throughout the 1960s, forcing restructuring across the country, the CB&Q merged with the Great Northern, Northern Pacific, and the Spokane, Portland and Seattle (SP&S) railroads on March 2, 1970, to form the Burlington Northern Railroad (BN), with Louis Menk serving as the company's first president and CEO (twenty-six years later, the BN and Santa Fe Railroads merged to become the Burlington Northern and Santa Fe Railway (BNSF)). Most of the passenger operations were taken over in 1971 by Amtrak.

==== Steam program ====
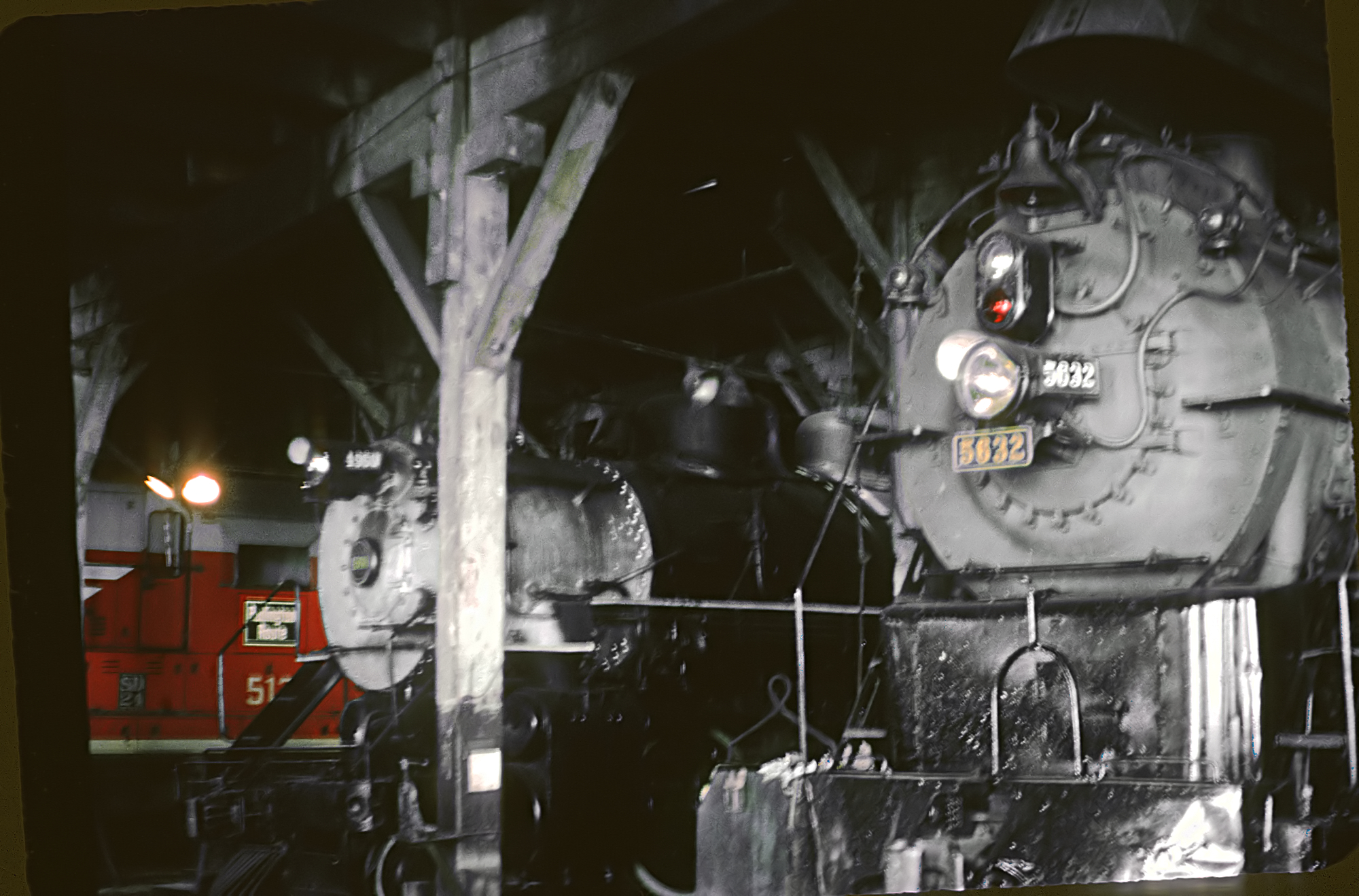
Chicago, Burlington and Quincy steam locomotives 4960 and 5632 sitting inside the Clyde Roundhouse on August 22, 1962

Beginning in the summer of 1955, the CB&Q hosted a series of occasional steam excursion trains at the request of railfan clubs, such as the Illinois Railroad Club. Harry C. Murphy was a steam fan who recognized the popularity of steam locomotives, and he commissioned for additional steam excursions to take place on the railroad throughout the late 1950s and early 1960s. Twenty-one steam locomotives of varying classes took part in the CB&Q's new steam excursion program, of which only two remained operational by 1961: 2-8-2 No. 4960 and 4-8-4 No. 5632. In 1962, the CB&Q's passenger department began sponsoring the excursion runs by offering ticket discounts to paying customers, and the Burlington began to host several school trains for school students.

In 1964, steam excursion operations on the railroad had dwindled, amidst rising operation and maintenance costs, a loss of experienced steam locomotive mechanics, and declining revenue passenger operations; the only factors that kept the CB&Q's steam excursions going were public demand and Harry Murphy's passion for steam. In the process of reducing operating costs for the railroad, Murphy's successor, Louis Menk, ordered for the CB&Q's steam excursion program to be shut down by August 1, 1966. Despite a public outcry and protest over the program's cancellation, the No. 4960 locomotive pulled the railroad's final excursion train on July 17.

== The Burlington Zephyrs ==
The passengers, including "Zeph" the burro, that rode the Zephyr on the "Dawn-to-Dusk Dash" gather for a group photo in front of the train after arriving in Chicago on May 26, 1934.

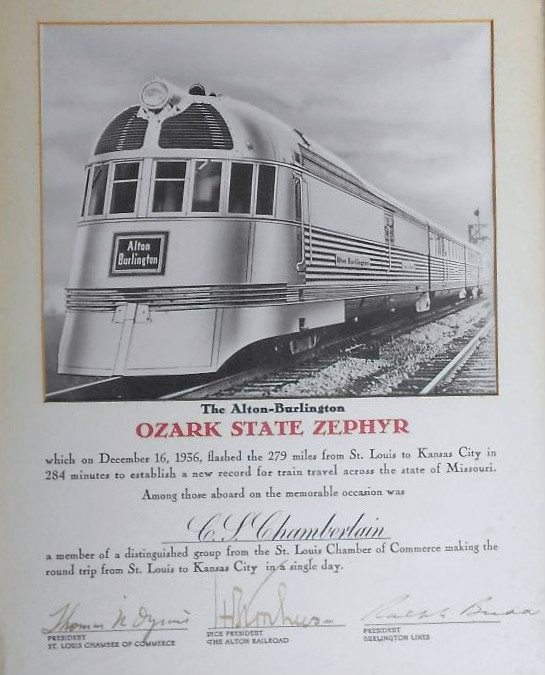
The Alton-Burlington Ozark State Zephyr in 1936.

The railroad operated a number of streamlined passenger trains known as the Zephyrs which were one of the most famous and largest fleets of streamliners in the United States. The Burlington Zephyr, the first American diesel-electric powered streamlined passenger train, made its noted "dawn-to-dusk" run from Denver, Colorado, to Chicago, Illinois, on May 26, 1934. On November 11, 1934, the train was put into regularly scheduled service between Lincoln, Nebraska, and Kansas City, Missouri. Although the distinctive, articulated stainless steel trains were well known, and the railroad adopted the "Way of the Zephyrs" advertising slogan, they did not attract passengers back to the rails en masse, and the last one was retired from revenue service with the advent of Amtrak.

The Zephyr fleet included:

- Pioneer Zephyr (Lincoln–Omaha–Kansas City)
- Twin Cities Zephyr (Chicago–Minneapolis-St. Paul)
- Mark Twain Zephyr (St. Louis–Burlington)
- Denver Zephyr (Chicago–Denver)
- Nebraska Zephyr (Chicago–Lincoln)
- Sam Houston Zephyr (Houston–Dallas-Ft. Worth)
- Ozark State Zephyr (Kansas City–St. Louis)
- General Pershing Zephyr (Kansas City–St. Louis)
- Silver Streak Zephyr (Kansas City–Omaha–Lincoln)
- Ak-Sar-Ben Zephyr (Chicago–Lincoln)
- Zephyr Rocket (St. Louis–Burlington–Minneapolis-St. Paul), jointly with Rock Island
- Texas Zephyr (Denver–Dallas-Ft. Worth)
- American Royal Zephyr (Chicago–Kansas City)
- Kansas City Zephyr (Chicago–Kansas City)
- California Zephyr (Chicago–Oakland): Chicago–Denver handled by CB&Q; Denver–Salt Lake City by Denver and Rio Grande Western Railroad; Salt Lake City–Oakland by Western Pacific Railroad

Other named passenger trains which operated on the Burlington included:

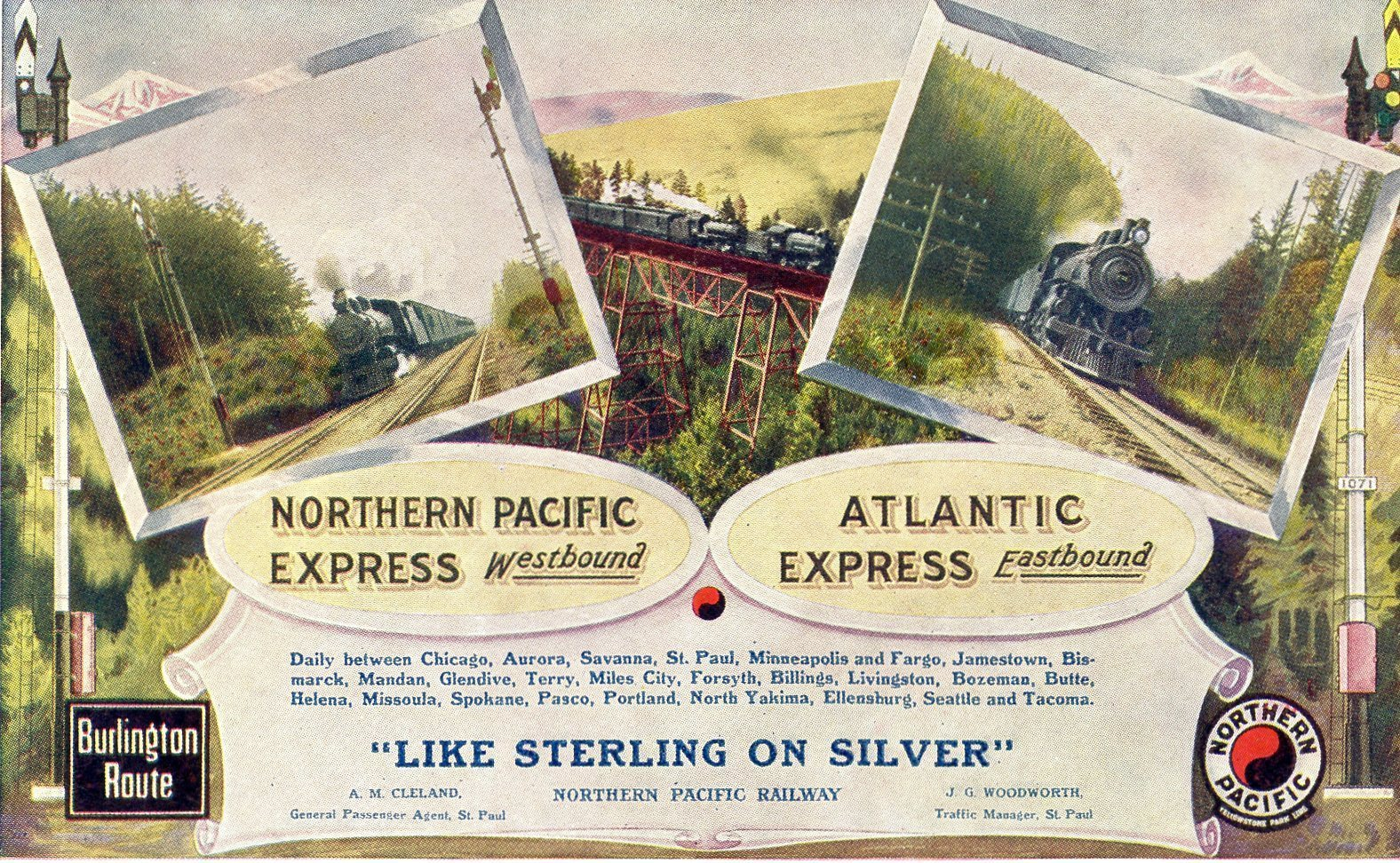
These trains were operated jointly with Northern Pacific Railway and had a different name when they were east or westbound.

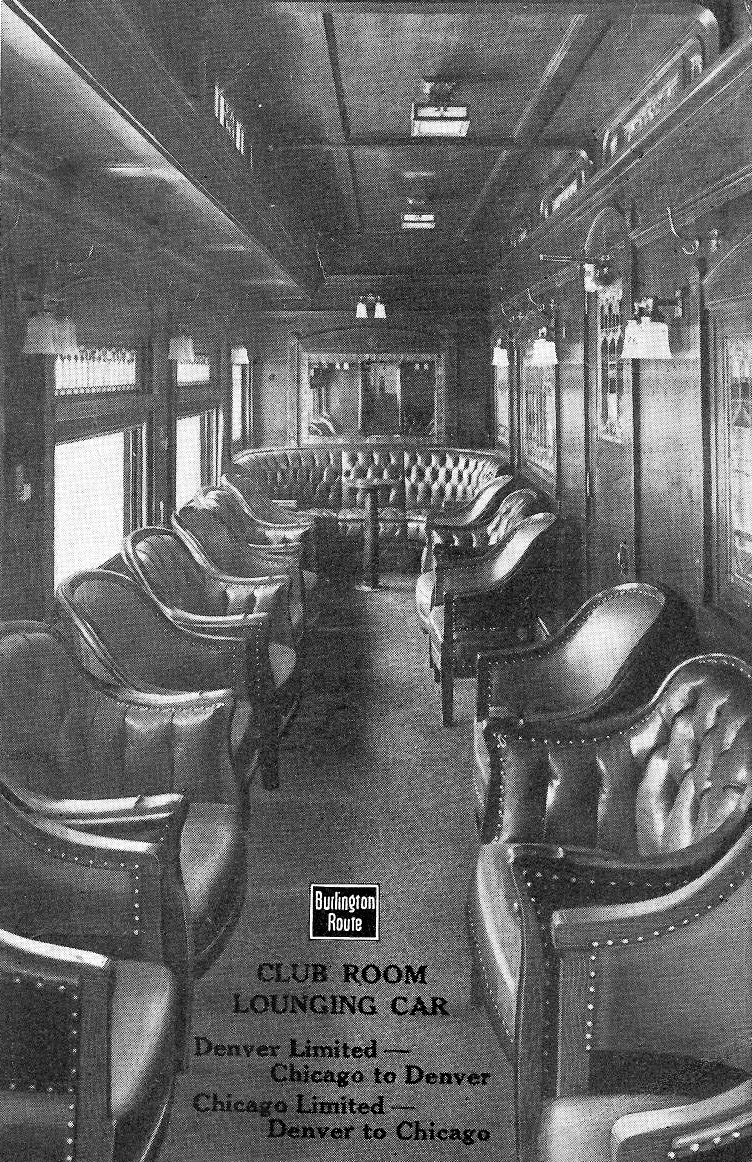
The club car of the Chicago Limited and the Denver Limited. The train had an eastbound and westbound name.

- Adventureland (Kansas City-Billings)
- Aristocrat (Chicago–Denver): replaced the Colorado Limited
- Ak-Sar-Ben (Chicago–Lincoln): replaced Nebraska Limited and replaced by Ak-Sar-Ben Zephyr
- American Royal (Chicago–Kansas City): replaced by the American Royal Zephyr.
- Atlantic Express (Seattle-Tacoma-Chicago): jointly with Northern Pacific Railway
- Black Hawk (Chicago–Twin Cities overnight)
- Buffalo Bill (Denver-Yellowstone) Seasonal tri-weekly service between Denver, and Yellowstone National Park via Cody, Wyoming
- Chicago Limited (Chicago-Denver)
- Coloradoan (Chicago–Denver): replaced by the Aristocrat
- Denver Limited (Denver-Chicago)
- Exposition Flyer (Chicago–Oakland) in conjunction with D&RGW and WP before the launching of the California Zephyr
- Empire Builder: handled Great Northern Railway's flagship between Chicago and Minneapolis
- Fast Mail (Chicago–Lincoln)
- Mainstreeter: handled the Northern Pacific Railway's secondary transcontinental between Chicago and Minneapolis
- Nebraska Limited (Chicago–Lincoln): replaced by the Ak-Sar-Ben
- North Coast Limited: handled Northern Pacific Railway's flagship between Chicago and Minneapolis
- North Pacific Express (Chicago-Seattle-Tacoma): jointly with Northern Pacific Railway
- Overland Express (Chicago-Denver). This train, along with The Aristocrat and the Colorado Limited, were promoted as companion trains to the streamlined Denver Zephyr
- Shoshone: (Denver-Billings) operated between Denver and Billings, Montana; referred to affectionately as "The Night Crawler"
- Western Star: handled the Great Northern Railway's secondary transcontinental between Chicago and Minneapolis
- Zephyr Connection: (Denver-Cheyenne) offered daytime service along Colorado's Front Range between Denver and Cheyenne, Wyoming

The California Zephyr is still operated daily by Amtrak as trains Five (westbound) and Six (eastbound). Another Amtrak train, the Illinois Zephyr, is a modern descendant of the Kansas City Zephyr and the American Royal Zephyr services.

== Preserved locomotives ==
Multiple locomotives from the Burlington have been preserved, including two Zephyr power units, thirty-five steam locomotives, and thirty-four diesel locomotives.

- Pioneer (locomotive) (4-2-0) – Built by Baldwin in 1837, Sold Secondhand to the Galena & Chicago Union Railroad as the very first steam locomotive to operate out of Chicago, Illinois. Briefly leased afterwards to the Aurora Branch Railroad as their first locomotive used. It is currently on static display at the Chicago History Museum without a tender.
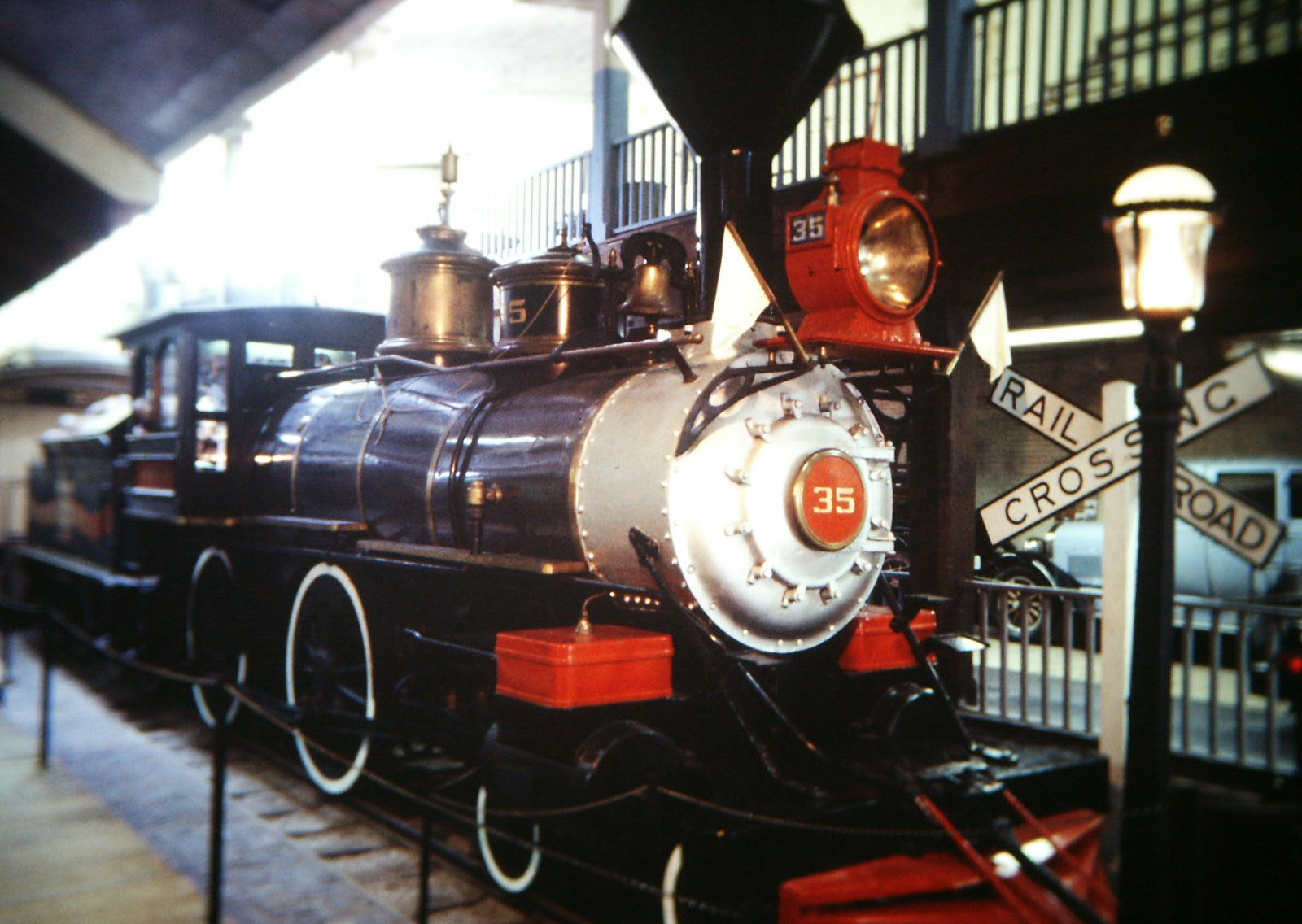
- Chicago, Burlington and Quincy 4-4-0 steam locomotive 35 on static display at Patee House Museum.
  35 (A-2 4-4-0) – Made appearances at the 1933 Chicago World's Fair, the 1939 New York World's Fair(as Union Pacific 119) and the Chicago Railroad Fair in 1948. Currently on static display at the Patee House Museum in St. Joseph, Missouri.
- 114 (GE U28B) – Currently painted as Transkentucky Transportation Railroad 260, it is awaiting restoration back to its Burlington appearance by the Illinois Railway Museum in Union, Illinois.
- 504 (EMD SD24) – Operational and used for pulling occasional tourist trains at the Illinois Railway Museum in Union, Illinois.
- 637 (K-2 4-6-0) – Made an appearance at the Chicago Railroad Fair, and was used for pulling the Burlington's excursion trains in the mid-1950s. Currently on static display at the Illinois Railway Museum in Union, Illinois.
- 710 (K-4 4-6-0) – Currently on static display at Iron Horse Park in Lincoln, Nebraska.
- 719 (K-4 4-6-0) – Currently on static display in Sudman Field at Laing Park in Alliance, Nebraska.
- 915 (K-4 4-6-0) – Currently on static display at the RailsWest Railroad Museum in Council Bluffs, Iowa.
- 967 (K-10 4-6-0) – Currently on static display at the Pioneer Village in Minden, Nebraska.
- 1175 (H-2 2-6-0) – Sold Secondhand to the Wyoming Railway and renumbered #105. Currently on static display as #105 at City Park in Buffalo, Wyoming. In poor condition, missing multiple components, such as it's Tender, Pilot Wheels, Driving Rods, among others.
- 1548 (G-3 0-6-0) – The only Burlington 0-6-0 preserved, currently on static display behind Quaker Square in Akron, Ohio.
- 3001 (S-4 4-6-4) – Currently on static display at Ottumwa station in Ottumwa, Iowa.
- 3003 (S-4 4-6-4) – Currently on static display in Burlington, Iowa.
- 3006 (S-4 4-6-4) – Currently on static display at Colton Park in Galesburg, Illinois.
- 3007 (S-4 4-6-4) – Currently on static display at the Illinois Railway Museum in Union, Illinois.
- 4000 "Æolus" (S-4a 4-6-4) – Rebuilt as a streamlined locomotive for use as an emergency backup for the Zephyr motor units, streamlining was later removed during World War II. Currently on static display at Copeland Park in La Crosse, Wisconsin.
- 4960 (O-1a 2-8-2) – Used in the Burlington's steam excursion program in the 1960s, was later used to pull tourist trains for the Bristol and Northwestern Railroad. It has been heavily modified, and is currently operational at the Grand Canyon Railway between Grand Canyon National Park and Williams, Arizona.
- 4963 (O-1a 2-8-2) – Used on the Bevier and Southern Railroad before being used as a spare parts provider for 4960. Has been on static display at the Illinois Railway Museum in Union, Illinois, since 1991.
- 4978 (O-1a 2-8-2) – Formerly on static display in Ottawa, Illinois, currently resides at Mendota station in Mendota, Illinois.
- 4994 (O-1a 2-8-2) – Currently on static display as Fort Worth and Denver 401 at Texas Tech University in Lubbock, Texas.
- 5614 (O-5B 4-8-4) – Currently on static display at Patee Park in St. Joseph, Missouri.
- 5629 (O-5B 4-8-4) – Currently on static display at the Colorado Railroad Museum in Golden, Colorado.
- 5631 (O-5A 4-8-4) – Currently on static display in Sheridan, Wyoming.
- 5633 (O-5A 4-8-4) – Currently on static display in Douglas, Wyoming.
- 9146 (EMD SW1) – Currently operational at Gopher State Railway Museum in New Prague, Minnesota as Northern States Power Company 4.
- 9255 (EMD SW7) – Currently operational at the Illinois Railway Museum in Union, Illinois.
- 9903 Injun Joe (Mark Twain Zephyr power unit) – Undergoing restoration by the Wisconsin Great Northern Railroad in Trego, Wisconsin.
- 9908 Silver Charger (General Pershing Zephyr power unit) – Currently on static display at the National Museum of Transportation in St. Louis, Missouri.
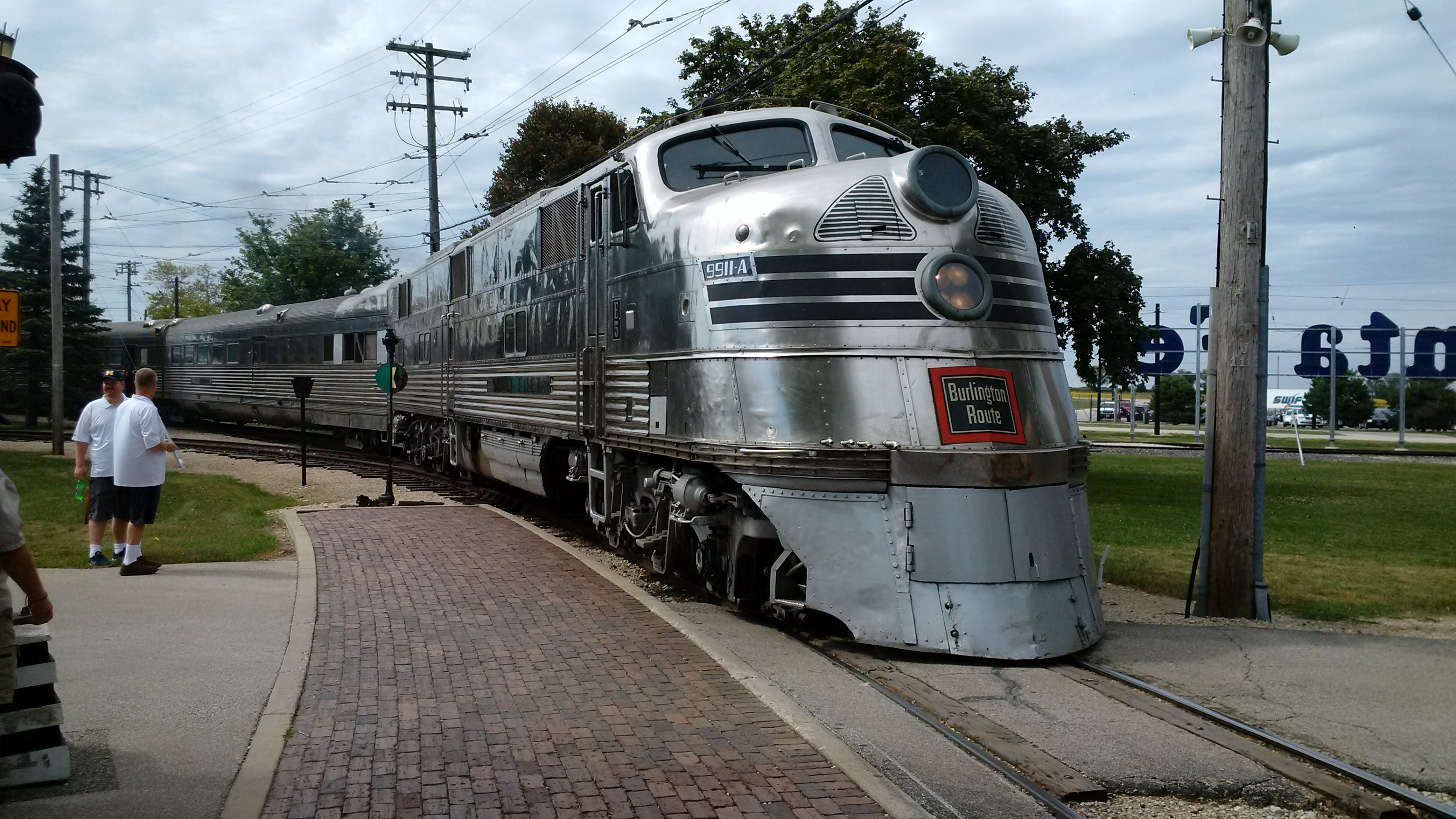
- Chicago Burlington and Quincy 9911A at the Illinois Railway Museum
  9911A Silver Pilot (EMC E5A) – The sole surviving EMC E5, currently operational and used to pull excursion trains at the Illinois Railway Museum in Union, Illinois.
- 9976 (EMD E9AM) – Currently undergoing restoration at the Illinois Railway Museum in Union, Illinois.
- 9989A (EMD E9A) – Rebuilt as Burlington Northern 3, currently operational at the Illinois Railway Museum in Union, Illinois.
- Pioneer Zephyr – The original record setting Denver to Chicago consist. On static display at the Museum of Science and Industry in Chicago, Illinois.

== Innovations ==
The Burlington was a leader in innovation; among its firsts were use of the printing telegraph (1910), train radio communications (1915), streamlined passenger diesel power (1934) and vista-dome coaches (1945). In 1927, the railroad was one of the first to use Centralized Traffic Control (CTC) and by the end of 1957 had equipped 1,500 miles (2,400 km) of its line. It played a central role in bringing air brakes to freight service.

The railroad had one of the first hump classification yards at its Cicero Avenue Yard in Chicago, allowing an operator in a tower to line switches remotely and allowing around-the-clock classification. The company also tested the twin cylinder car.

== Cities platted by the Chicago, Burlington and Quincy Railroad ==
- Massena, Iowa
- Pacific Junction, Iowa

== See also ==
- Burlington Refrigerator Express
- History of rail transportation in the United States
- Milo Kendall
- Batavia Depot Museum
