= Chicago, Burlington and Quincy 710 =

Preserved American 4-6-0 locomotive

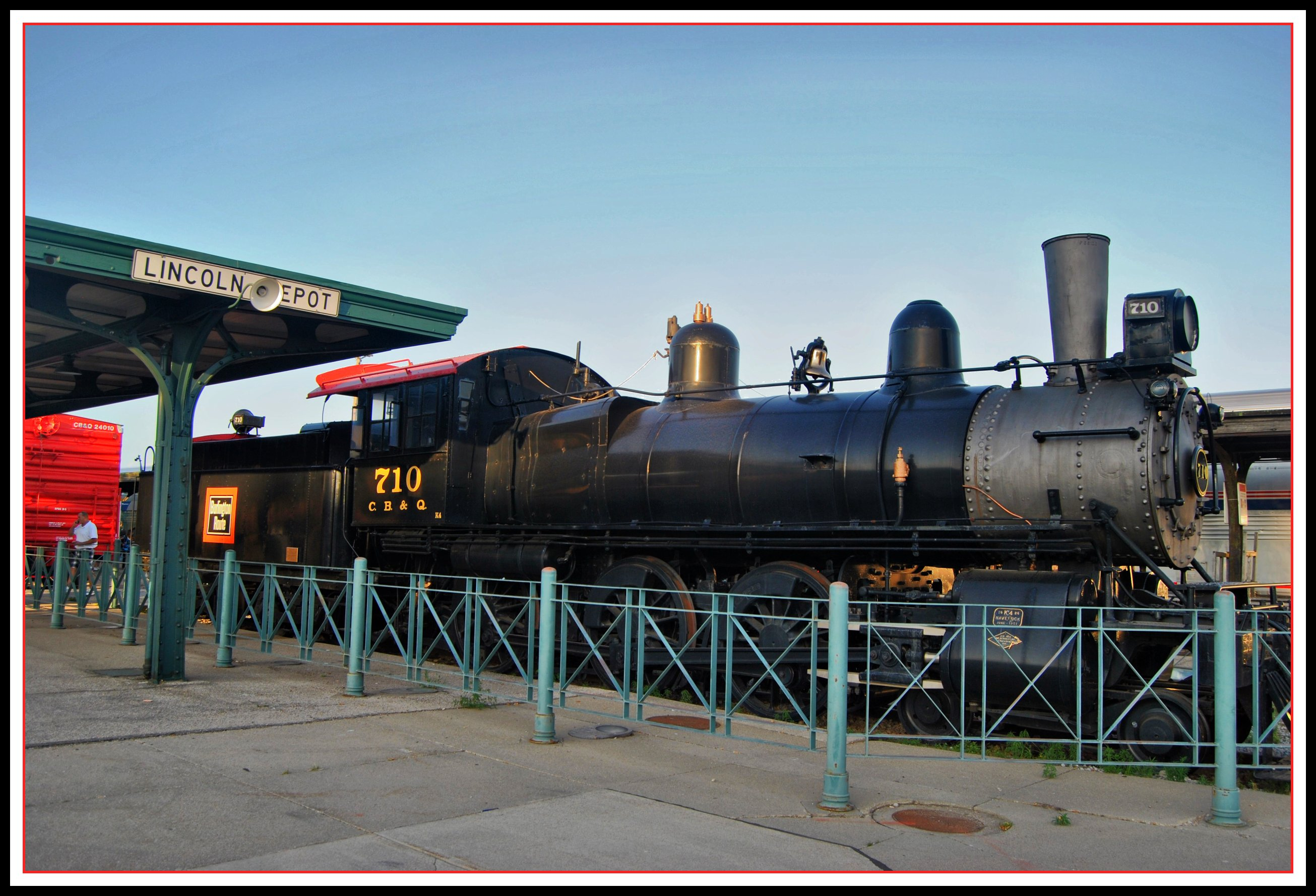
- No. 710 on display at the former Lincoln station
Type and origin
- Power type: Steam
- Builder: The Havelock Shops of the Burlington & Missouri River Railroad in Nebraska
- Build date: June 1901
- Rebuild date: 1928
Specifications
- Configuration
  - Whyte: 4-6-0
- Gauge: 4 ft 8 1/2 in (1,435 mm)
- Driver dia.: 64 in (1.626 m)
- Loco weight: 78 tons
- Tender weight: 18 tons
- Total weight: 96 tons
- Fuel type: Coal
- Fuel capacity: 9 short tons (8.2 tonnes)
- Water cap.: 5,000 US gal (19,000 L; 4,200 imp gal)
- Firebox
  - Grate area: 30 sq ft (2.8 m^{2})
- Boiler pressure: 200 lbf/in^{2} (1.38 MPa)
- Cylinders: Two, outside
- Cylinder size: 19 in × 26 in (483 mm × 660 mm)
- Valve gear: Stephenson
Performance figures
- Maximum speed: 70–80 mph (110–130 km/h)
- Tractive effort: 25,000 lbf (111.2 kN)
- Factor of adh.: 4.85
Career
- Operators: Burlington and Missouri River Railroad; Chicago, Burlington and Quincy Railroad
- Class: K-4
- Retired: December 1954
- Current owner: City of Lincoln
- Disposition: On static display
- Chicago, Burlington, & Quincy Steam Locomotive No. 710
- U.S. National Register of Historic Places
- Location within Nebraska Location within the United States
- Location: vicinity of 7th & Q Streets, Lincoln, Nebraska
- Coordinates: 40°48′57″N 96°42′42″W
- Area: less than one acre
- NRHP reference No.: 97000609
- Added to NRHP: June 20, 1997

Chicago Burlington and Quincy 710 is a preserved 4-6-0 "Ten-Wheeler" type steam locomotive on display at the former Lincoln station in Lincoln, Nebraska. Built in 1901, No. 710 was built for high speed passenger service. After a rebuild in 1928, the locomotive provided branch line passenger and freight service until its retirement in 1954.

The locomotive was listed on the National Register of Historic Places on June 20, 1997.

== History ==
CB&Q No. 710 was built in June 1901 originally as the Burlington and Missouri River Railroad (B&MR) No. 31 at the Havelock shops in Havelock, Nebraska. The first run of the locomotive was on July 9, 1901, pulling a freight train. Soon, it was assigned to pull high speed passenger trains from Creston to Lincoln, but this lasted less than a year before it was reassigned to run from Lincoln to Ravenna. In October 1904, the B&MR was consolidated into the Chicago, Burlington and Quincy (CB&Q), resulting in B&MR No. 31 becoming CB&Q No. 710. No. 710 underwent major repairs with a new cab and new couplers in 1906 and assigned to the Aurora (Illinois) Division. From 1914 to 1927, the locomotive served on the Brookfield and Hannibal Divisions in Missouri. In 1927 the locomotive was assigned to the La Crosse (Wisconsin) Division, where its service as a mainline locomotive came to an end.

In 1928, major alterations such as reducing the size of the driving wheels took place. After the rebuild, the locomotive was put on the Wymore (Nebraska) Division, usually pulling passenger trains No. 89 and 90, which ran from Omaha to Concordia, KS via Lincoln. No. 710 would normally only pull these trains on the section from Wymore to Concordia. Trains 89 and 90 became mixed trains on November 26, 1932, with a short reintroduction as passenger only trains in 1936, which would be the last time No. 710 pulled a dedicated passenger train. The locomotive was renumbered to No. 910 in the summer of 1951 and continued hauling trains No. 89 and 90 until September 1953. No. 710 was retired in December 1954.

Following retirement, No. 710 was donated to the city of Lincoln in February 1955 and placed in Pioneers Park. It was the first locomotive donated by the CB&Q, and the first locomotive donated to a city in Nebraska. After a restoration in 1991, the locomotive was moved to the present site at the former Lincoln station.
