= Wyoming Railway =

Former American railroad in Wyoming

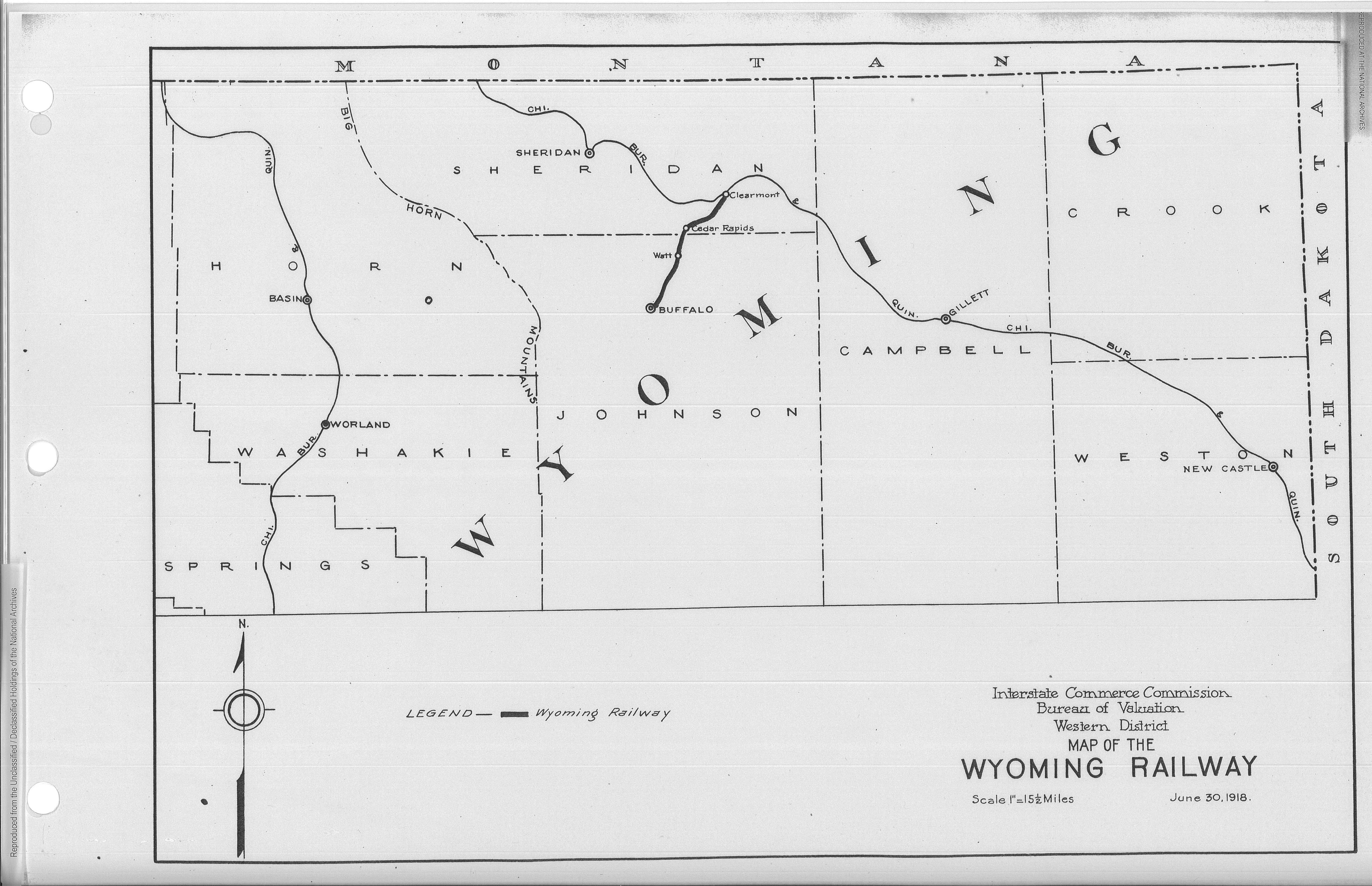
1918 map of the railroad

The Wyoming Railway, now defunct, was an American railroad built and operated between the towns of Clearmont and Buffalo, Wyoming, a distance of 28.53 miles (45.91 km). The railroad provided Buffalo with a link to the national railway network via a connection with the Chicago, Burlington and Quincy Railroad at Clearmont. It was established May 26, 1909 and was abandoned March 30, 1952.

== History ==
The Wyoming Railway Company was incorporated in Wyoming on May 26, 1909. Construction work began in 1913, and the first trains operated the following year. The line was built to standard-gauge with 56-to-65-pound-per-yard (28 to 32 kg/m) rail.

Until c. 1946 the Wyoming Railway Company was a subsidiary of the Wyoming Company, a non-railroad company, incorporated February 2, 1910, in South Dakota as a holding company. The Wyoming Company engaged in operating a railroad, mining coal, and ranch activities through the following subsidiaries: Wyoming Railway Company, Buffalo Wyoming Coal Company, and the Northern Wyoming Land Company. Its general office was in Cedar Rapids, Iowa. At this time the Wyoming Railway's general office was also in Cedar Rapids, Iowa.

New interests purchased the Wyoming Railway c. 1946. In July 1948, the company filed with the Interstate Commerce Commission a copy of a petition to the United States District Court of Wyoming under Section 77 of the U. S. Bankruptcy Act, which asked that the company be reorganized. The petition listed debts of $1,781,931.41 and stated that funds to discharge such debts are not and will not be available. The greatest portion of the debt consisted of $644,940 twenty-year first mortgage sinking fund bonds owned by C. Porter Dickson, president of the Wyoming Railway Company. The ICC approved the appointment of R. E. McNally as trustee.

The trustee ultimately filed with the ICC to abandon the railroad and, as it usually did, the ICC approved the abandonment, effective March 30, 1952. At the time of its abandonment 1) all of the Wyoming Railway Company's bonded debt ($664,000 of First Gold 6% Bonds due 1933, on which no interest had been paid since 1921 and which were unredeemed) and 9,993 shares of its 10,000 shares of common stock were owned by C. Porter Dickson, and 2) the Wyoming Railway Company owned three steam locomotives, two passenger cars, five freight cars (reportedly not interchangeable), and one service car. During the Dickson administration, the general office of the Wyoming Railway was in Room 404 of the Patterson Building, Denver 2, Colorado. In its final years the railroad usually employed 17 people.

The principal traffic of the Wyoming Railway was coal from affiliated mines near Buffalo, and, with their demise, the railroad lost its principal traffic.
