= Prosser Twin Cylinder Car Company =

Car company in Chicago, Illinois, USA

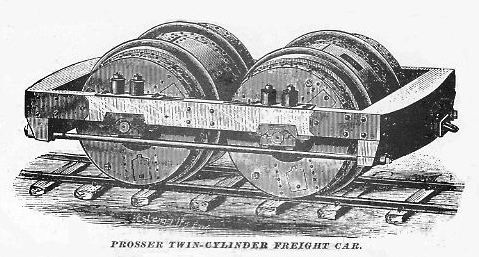
- Engraving of Prosser Twin Cylinder Freight Car
- Industry: Rail transport
- Founded: late 1870s
- Defunct: February 26, 1884
- Headquarters: Chicago, US
- Products: Freight cars

The Prosser Twin Cylinder Car Company was established in the late 1870s at 129 LaSalle Street, Chicago, Illinois, to manufacture the unique Prosser Twin Cylinder Freight Car. While the concept worked well, the railroad industry would in turn reject the concept and the company went out of business on February 26, 1884.

== Twin Cylinder Freight Car ==
The Prosser Twin Cylinder freight car was intended to revolutionize the transport of grain by carrying it in two enormous iron cylinders about 8 1/2 ft (2.6 m) long and 6 1/2 ft (2.0 m) in diameter, each revolving on an axle running through its center, at the ends of which were the journal boxes. Effectively, the car would possess no superstructure, and instead the cargo would be carried inside the car's axles themselves. Steel tires, flanged and fitted to the gauge of track, were put around the cylinders, which served as the wheels of the car. The Westinghouse Air Brake Company developed a system of air brakes specifically for this type of freight car.

The prototype car underwent trials on the CB&Q Railroad, making six round trips of 200 mi (320 km) each, supposedly turning the grain out at the end of each trip one grade better than when it was first loaded. Railroad personnel were satisfied with it, since there was said to be no trouble in passing curves, frogs and switches. In addition, the car required less lubrication than conventional cars, and experienced significantly less rolling resistance due to a lower dead weight and a lower center of gravity. Due to the extremely large wheel diameter, track wear was reduced. Due to its all-iron construction, the car was even supposedly fireproof. Despite all these advantages, the Prosser Twin Cylinder design was eventually deemed too radical, and was never replicated.

== See also ==
- Rolling stock
- List of railway vehicles
- Class U special wagon
