= Class 05 =

Class 05 may refer to:

- British Rail Class 05, a class of 0-6-0 post-war, British diesel-mechanical shunter built by Hunslet Engine Company.
- DRG Class 05, a small class of inter-war, German, standard steam locomotive (Einheitslokomotive) designed for high-speed express services and which broke 2 world speed records.

== See also ==
- Class 5 (disambiguation)
