= Milo Kendall =

American lawyer (1819–1905)

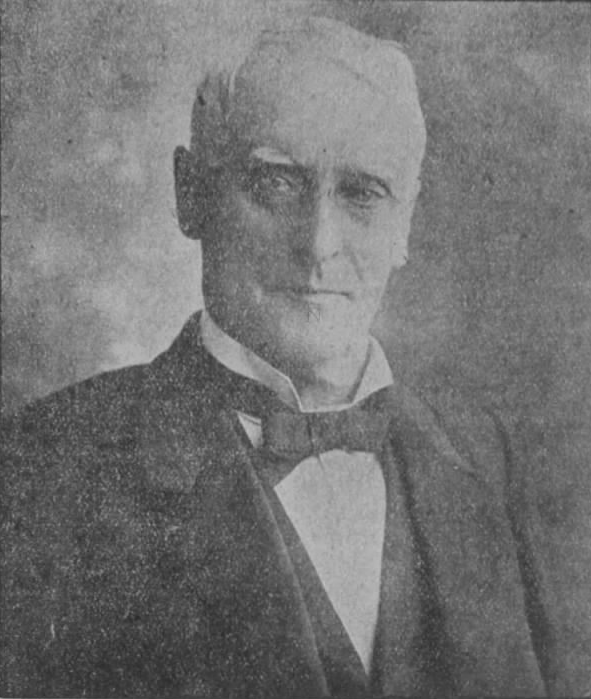
Kendall in a 1905 newspaper

Milo Kendall (April 1, 1819 – December 25, 1905) was a lawyer and businessman from Illinois. Kendall was the attorney for the Chicago, Burlington and Quincy Railroad during a time of rapid expansion for railroad companies in the Midwest.

== Early life ==
Milo Kendall was born on April 1, 1819, in Waterford, Vermont, to Jerrab Kendall. He worked on his father's farm until the age of 18. He went to school in Newberry and graduated from a school in Lyndon. He studied law with Bartlett & Fletcher in Lyndon and was admitted to the bar.

== Career ==
In 1845, Kendall moved to Knoxville, Illinois, and began practicing law there. He became attorney for the Chicago, Burlington and Quincy Railroad.

== Personal life ==
Kendall married Orpha Ide, daughter of John Ide, on September 3, 1848. They had two children, William Ide and Nellie. His wife died in 1900. He lived on West South Street in Princeton, Illinois.

Kendall died on December 25, 1905, at his home in Princeton.
