= GCR Class 5A =

Class of British 0-6-0T steam locomotives

GCR Class 5A LNER Class J63
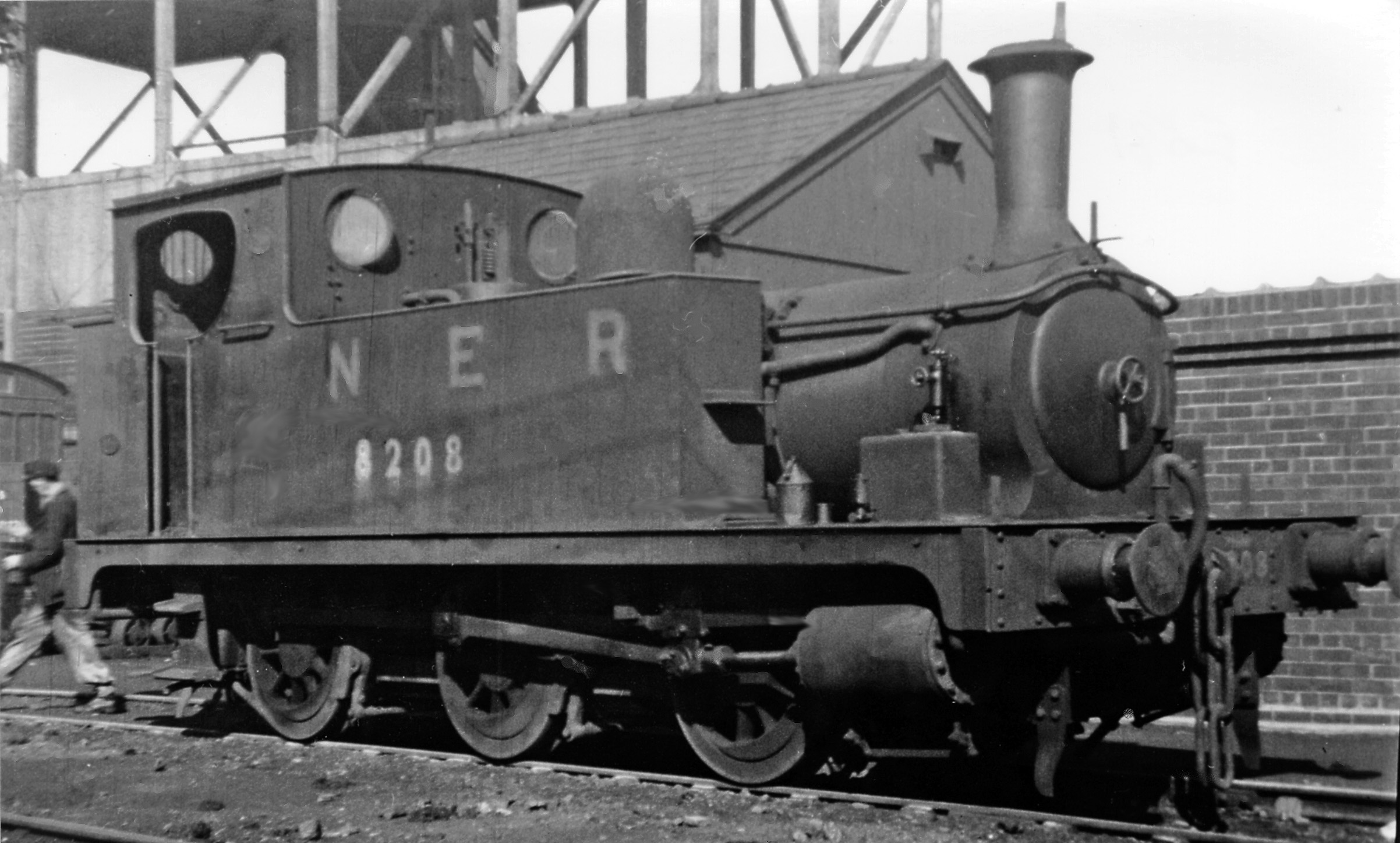
- No. 8208 at Immingham engine shed in 1947
Type and origin
- Power type: Steam
- Designer: John G. Robinson
- Build date: 1906–1914
- Total produced: 7
Specifications
- Configuration
  - Whyte: 0-6-0T
  - UIC: C n2t
- Gauge: 4 ft 8 1/2 in (1,435 mm)
- Driver dia.: 3 ft 6 in (1.067 m)
- Wheelbase: 12 ft 0 in (3.66 m)
- Length: 26 ft 11.5 in (8.22 m) over buffers
- Loco weight: 37 long tons 9 cwt (83,900 lb or 38.1 t)
- Fuel type: Coal
- Fuel capacity: 1 long ton 10 cwt (3,400 lb or 1.5 t)
- Water cap.: 950 imp gal (4,320 L; 1,140 US gal)
- Firebox
  - Grate area: 11.43 sq ft (1.062 m^{2})
- Boiler pressure: 150 psi (1.03 MPa)
- Heating surface: 590 sq ft (55 m^{2})
- Cylinders: Two, outside
- Cylinder size: 13 in × 20 in (330 mm × 508 mm)
Performance figures
- Tractive effort: 10,260 lbf (45.64 kN)
Career
- Operators: Great Central Railway; → London and North Eastern Railway; → British Railways
- Class: GCR: 5A; LNER: J63
- Number in class: 7
- Nicknames: Dock Tanks
- Locale: Immingham & Mersey Docks
- Delivered: 1906-1914
- Withdrawn: 1953–1957
- Disposition: All scrapped

The GCR Class 5A was a class of seven 0-6-0T steams designed by John G. Robinson for work in docks operated by the Great Central Railway. They passed to the London and North Eastern Railway at the grouping in 1923 and received the LNER classification J63.

== History ==
The class was introduced in 1906 as a replacement for the GCR Class 4 dock shunters, based on his predecessor's GCR Class 5 but with side tanks rather than saddle tanks. A seventh locomotive was built in 1914.

All seven examples survived into British Railways ownership in 1948, at least one being at Immingham in 1952, and at least one at Connah's Quay in 1954. They were all withdrawn between 1953 and 1957.
