= Type V =

Type V or V-type may refer to:

- a Type V ship
- Dbx Type V noise reduction
- a filled via, in PCB manufacture
- a V engine, generically
  - a Renault V-Type engine specifically
- Type V collagen, a type of tissue
- Hyperlipoproteinemia type V, a blood disease
- Type V hypersensitivity, an immune system disease
- Glycogen storage disease type V, a metabolic disorder
- Marfan Syndrome type V, a genetic disorder
- Acrocephalosyndactyly, type V, a genetic disorder
- Mucopolysaccharidosis type V, a metabolic disorder
- Myosin type v, a motor protein
- a Type V restriction enzyme
- a V-type asteroid
- Type V, a human skin colour type on the Fitzpatrick scale
- Victorian Railways V type carriage

== See also ==
- Type 5
