= A5-class customs vessels =

The A5 class was a type of patrol/customs vessels of the Hellenic Navy, two of which were built at the Lavrion Shipyards in 1930, based on Italian designs. They were armed with a 76 mm gun, a machine gun, as well as depth charges. Both were destroyed during WWII (1941), the first bombed by RAF after it had been seized by the Germans.
