= V class =

V class or Class V may refer to:

== Automobiles ==
- Mercedes-Benz V-Class

== Ships ==
- V-class ferry, owned and operated by BC Ferries
- V and W-class destroyer, Royal Navy ships launched in late World War I
- U and V-class destroyer, Royal Navy ships launched in 1942–1943
- British V-class submarine (1914)
- British V-class submarine, 1941–42
- Vanguard-class submarine
- V1-class destroyer, torpedo boats of Germany and Greece

== Rail transport ==
- GNRI Class V, a 4-4-0 passenger steam locomotive of the Great Northern Railway (Ireland)
- GNoSR class V, a 4-4-0 passenger locomotive of the Great North of Scotland Railway, later LNER Class D40
- Manila Railway V class, a 0-6-0 steam locomotive
- NCC Class V, a 0-6-0 steam locomotive used by the Northern Counties Committee
- NZR V class, a 2-6-2 steam locomotive
- South Australian Railways V class, a 0-4-4 steam locomotive
- SR V class, a 4-4-0 passenger steam locomotive of the Southern Railway (Great Britain)
- Tasmanian Government Railways V class, a diesel locomotive
- WAGR V class, a 2-8-2 freight steam locomotive of the Western Australian Government Railways
- V class, a single unit Downer EDI Rail GT46C diesel electric locomotive for Freight Australia
- Victorian Railways V class, a 2-8-0 steam locomotive, used on the Victorian Railways in the period 1900-1930
- Victorian Railways V class (1857), a 0-6-0 steam locomotive
- Victorian Railways V class (diesel-hydraulic), a single locomotive class built as the shunter for the Jolimont Workshops
- V-class Melbourne tram

== See also ==
- Class 5 (disambiguation)
