= Group 5 =

Group 5 may refer to:

- Group 5 element, chemical element classification
- Group 5 (motorsport), FIA classification for cars in auto racing

== See also ==
- G5 (disambiguation)
