= Chicago, Burlington and Quincy class O-5 =

American locomotive class

Chicago Burlington and Quincy O-5 class
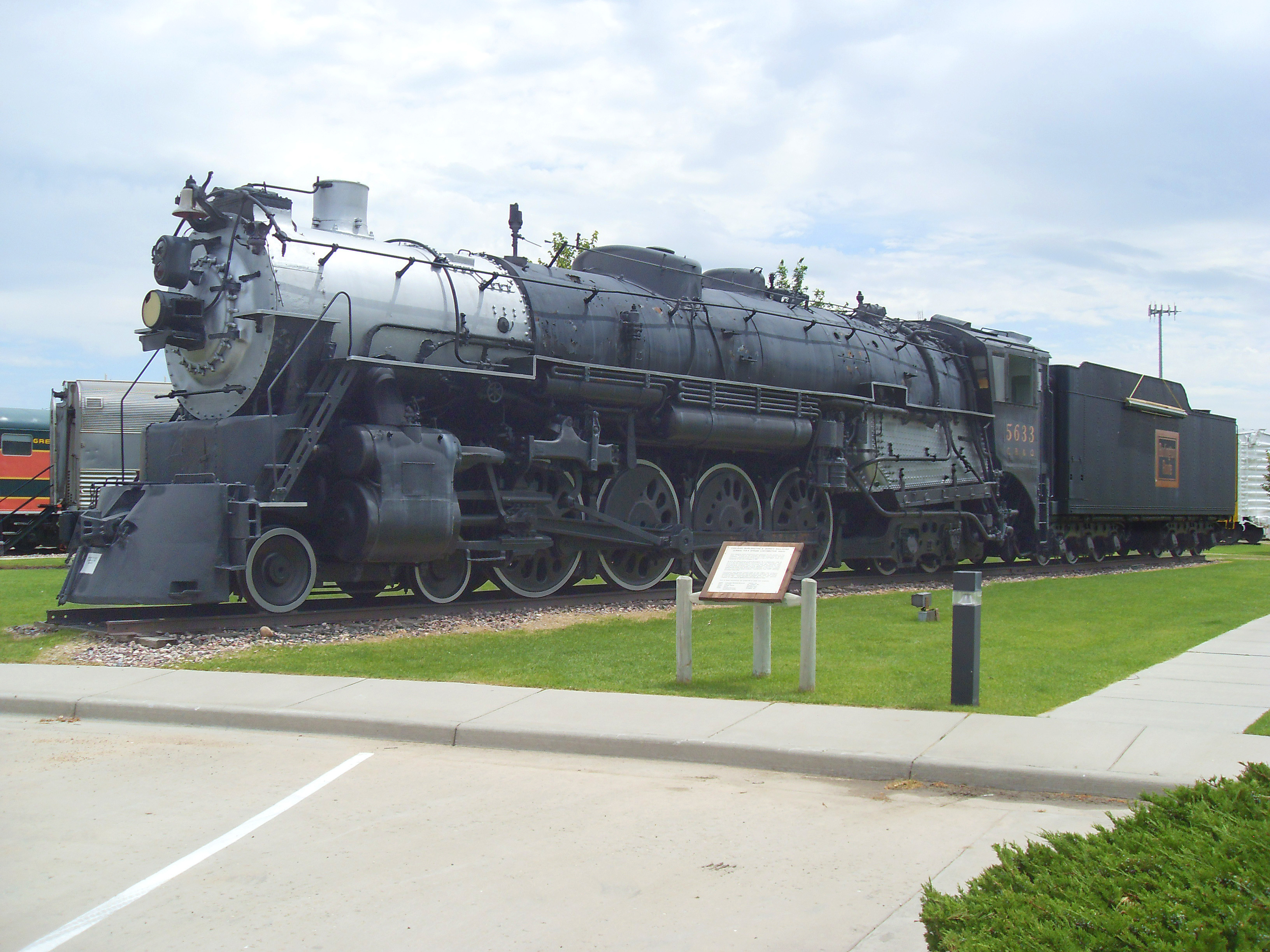
- Chicago, Burlington and Quincy Railroad 5633 in Douglas, WY, USA. Built 1940 until 1956 in service, moved to Douglas in 1962
Type and origin
- Power type: Steam
- Builder: Baldwin Locomotive Works, CB&Q
- Serial number: 61443-61444, 61496-61499, 61522-61523,
- Build date: August-October 1930, 1936-1940
- Total produced: 36
Specifications
- Configuration
  - Whyte: 4-8-4
  - UIC: 2′D2′ h2
- Gauge: 4 ft 8 1/2 in (1,435 mm) standard gauge
- Leading dia.: 37 in (940 mm)
- Driver dia.: 74 in (1,880 mm)
- Trailing dia.: 43 in (1,092 mm)
- Wheelbase: Loco & tender: 90.69 ft (27.64 m)
- Length: 103 ft 3 1/8 in (31.47 m) (O-5); 107 ft 3/8 in (32.62 m) (O-5A/B)
- Width: 10 ft 7 in (3.23 m)
- Height: 16 ft 2 in (4.93 m)
- Axle load: 69,340 lb (31,450 kg; 31.45 t) (O-5); 69,757.5 lb (31,641.5 kg; 31.6415 t) (O-5A/B)
- Adhesive weight: 272,000 lb (123,000 kg; 123 t) (O-5); 281,410 lb (127,650 kg; 127.65 t) (O-5A/B)
- Loco weight: 454,600 lb (206,200 kg; 206.2 t) (O-5); 476,050 lb (215,930 kg; 215.93 t) (O-5A/B)
- Tender weight: 337,000 lb (153,000 kg; 153 t) (O-5); 362,000 lb (164,000 kg; 164 t) (O-5A/B)
- Total weight: 791,600 lb (359,100 kg; 359.1 t) (O-5); 838,050 lb (380,130 kg; 380.13 t) (O-5A/B)
- Fuel type: Coal; Fuel oil (O-5B)
- Fuel capacity: 24 t (24 long tons; 26 short tons) (O-5); 27 t (27 long tons; 30 short tons) (O-5A); 7,300 US gal (28,000 L; 6,100 imp gal) (O-5B)
- Water cap.: 18,000 US gal (68,000 L; 15,000 imp gal)
- Firebox
  - Grate area: 106.50 sq ft (9.894 m^{2})
- Boiler pressure: 250 lbf/in^{2} (1.72 MPa)
- Heating surface
  - Firebox: 439 sq ft (40.8 m^{2}) (O-5); 433 sq ft (40.2 m^{2}) (O-5A/B)
- Superheater
  - Type: Type E
  - Heating area: 2,403 sq ft (223.2 m^{2})
- Cylinders: Two, outside
- Cylinder size: 28 in × 30 in (711 mm × 762 mm)
- Valve gear: Baker
- Valve type: Piston valves
- Loco brake: Air
- Train brakes: Air
Performance figures
- Maximum speed: Over 75 mph (121 km/h)
- Power output: 4,100 hp (3,100 kW)
- Tractive effort: 67,541 lbf (300.44 kN); 80,741 lbf (359.15 kN) with booster
- Factor of adh.: 4.03 (O-5); 4.13 (O-5A/B)
Career
- Operators: Chicago, Burlington and Quincy
- Class: O-5; O-5A; O-5B
- Numbers: 5600–5635
- Retired: Mid to late 1950s
- Preserved: Four preserved (Nos. 5614, 5629, 5631 and 5633)
- Disposition: Nos. 5614, 5629, 5631 and 5633 on display, remainder scrapped

The Chicago Burlington and Quincy O-5 was a class of 36 4-8-4 "Northern" type steam locomotives built by the Baldwin Locomotive Works in 1930 and the Chicago, Burlington and Quincy Railroad (CB&Q) between 1936 and 1940 and operated by the CB&Q until the late 1950s.

The locomotives saw service pulling both freight and passenger trains and four have been preserved, all of which are on display.

== History ==
=== Construction and revenue service ===
With an increase of traffic on the CB&Q, they needed more powerful locomotives to pull the heavier loads and increased number of cars hauled. In 1930, the CB&Q ordered eight 4-8-4 locomotives (Nos. 5600-5607) from the Baldwin Locomotive Works and classified them as O-5. Of the first six O-5s had fireboxes burning lignite coal while the last two took bituminous coal. No. 5607 had a booster that added 13,200 lbs (5,987 kg) tractive effort. One of the locomotives was reported to have pulled an 82-car mail train on October 17, 1944. Nos. 5600, 5602, 5604, 5605 and 5606 were fitted with Security circulators and reclassified as O-5A.

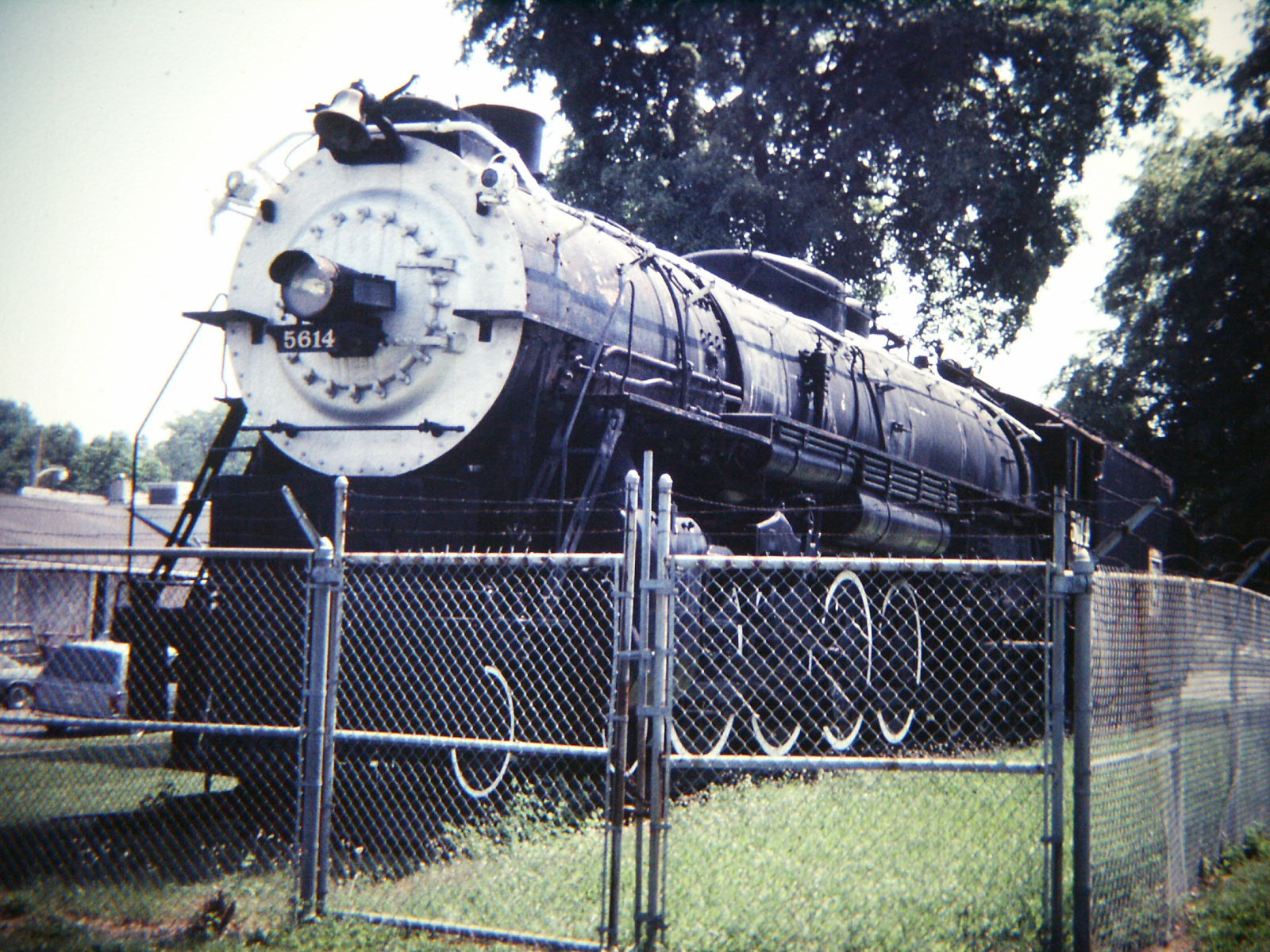
Locomotive 5614 on static display in St. Joseph, Missouri, 1985

Between 1936 and 1940, the CB&Q built their own versions of the O-5, following the success of the class, and they were classified as O-5A. Nos. 5609, 5618, 5619, 5620 were fitted with Security circulators and 5610 received thermic syphons. The last 15 O-5s (Nos. 5621-5635) were fitted with roller bearings on every axle, lightweight rods, all-weather vestibule cabs and a solid pilot. Although, the O-5A locomotives were also built with abnormal design features; the seatboxes inside the cabs were positioned too low, and the boilers were humpbacked beyond the sandboxes. Nos. 5614, 5620, 5626, 5627, 5629, and 5632 were converted to burn oil later in their service lives and were reclassified as O-5B. The O-5 class locomotives were capable at traveling at speeds as high as forty-five miles per hour while hauling 125 loaded cars.

By 1954, as the CB&Q invested in adding diesel locomotives to their roster, the O-5's were reassigned to pull freight trains in certain divisions; some O-5's were reassigned to run between Galesburg and Clyde, Illinois, North La Crosse, Wisconsin, and Pacific Junction, Iowa; other O-5's were reassigned to operate in the Lincoln-Omaha divisions in Nebraska and Iowa. As the railroad invested in adding EMD SD9 roadswitchers throughout the mid and late 1950s, the usefulness in the O-5's diminished, and most of them were put into storage, while those that remained in service were solely relegated to operate east of Lincoln, Nebraska. For two weeks in January 1957, eight O-5A locomotives were loaned to the Grand Trunk Western (GTW), in response to the GTW leasing some of its 4-8-4's to its parent company, the Canadian National, during a locomotive fireman strike on the Canadian Pacific. In July that same year, all six of the O-5B locomotives were removed from storage to operate in the Lincoln-Omaha divisions, in response to several diesel locomotives being transferred to serve that month's Nebraska wheat harvest. After the Lincoln-Omaha divisions were dieselized in November 1957, all of the remaining O-5 locomotives were removed from revenue service.

=== Excursion service and No. 5632 ===
Between 1955 and 1959, five of the O-5 class locomotives (numbers 5600, 5618, 5626, 5631, and 5632) were used to pull occasional excursion trains for the CB&Q, prior to their retirement. Beginning in 1960, No. 5632 was being used to pull additional excursion trains for the CB&Q's steam program, and this lasted until November 1, 1964, when the locomotive hauled its last train before its flue time expired. No. 5632 was subsequently disassembled for repairs, but by 1966, the railroad got a new president, Louis W. Menk, who ended the program, and the repairs on 5632 were halted. The locomotive was sold to steam engine caretaker Richard Jensen, who moved it to the Chicago and Western Indiana Roundhouse for storage. In 1969, No. 5632 was moved to a scrapyard, but it derailed on a curve and was later scrapped in November 1972.

== Preservation ==
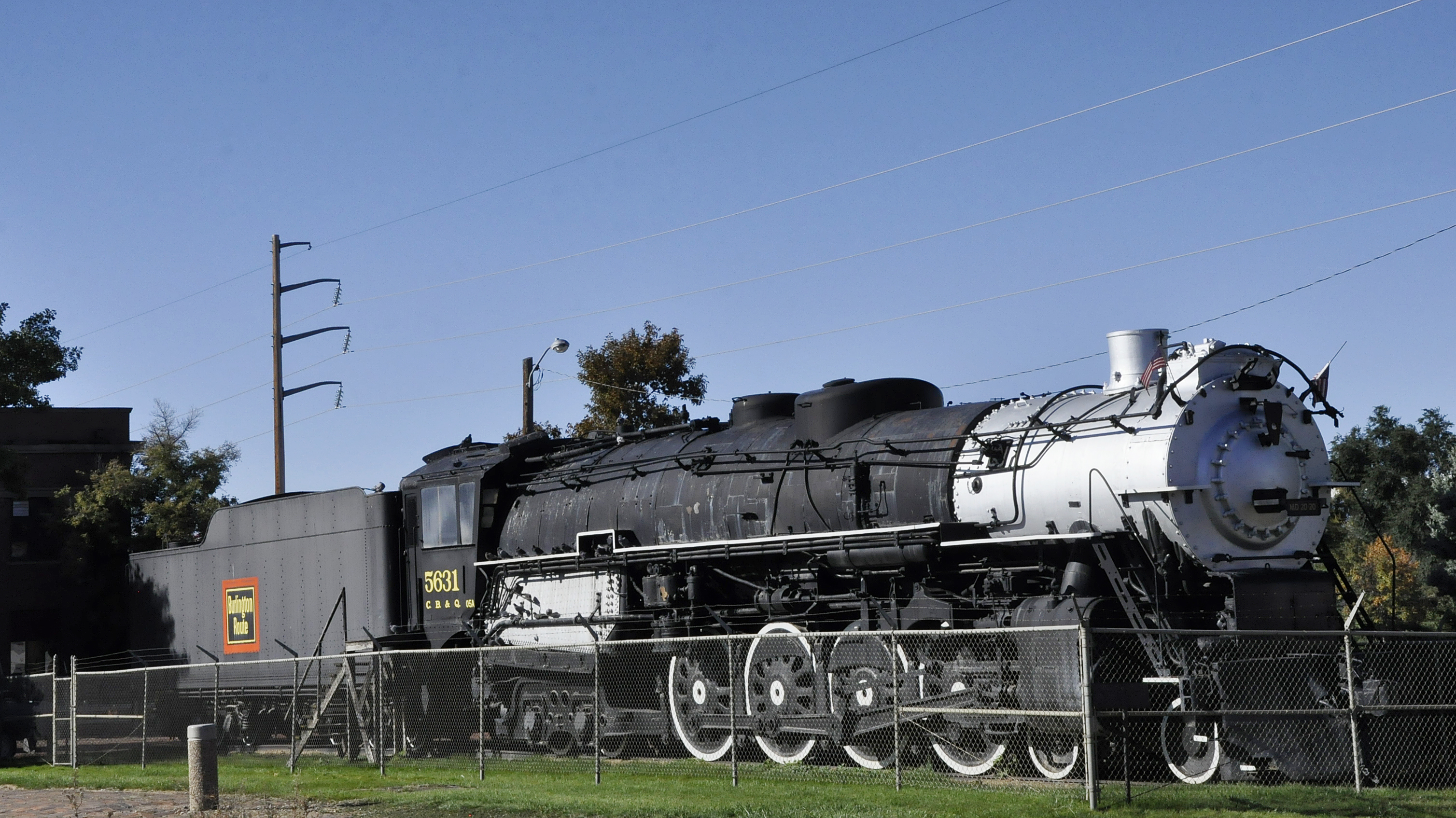
Locomotive 5631 on static display at Sheridan, Wyoming without a headlight

Four of the Burlington Route's "Northerns" have been preserved, all of which are of the O-5A/B batch.

- #5614 is on display at Patee Park in St. Joseph, Missouri.
- #5629 is on display at the Colorado Railroad Museum in Golden, Colorado.
- #5631 is on display at a depot in Sheridan, Wyoming.
- #5633 is on display at the Douglas Railroad Interpretive Center in Douglas, Wyoming.

== Roster ==
Number	Baldwin serial number	Date built	Disposition	Notes
5600	61443	August 1930	Sold for scrap.	Pulled the CB&Q's first excursion train from Chicago to Aurora, Illinois on July 3, 1955.
5601	61444	August 1930	Sold for scrap.	
5602	61496	September 1930	Sold for scrap.	
5603	61497	September 1930	Sold for scrap.	
5604	61498	September 1930	Sold for scrap.	
5605	61499	September 1930	Sold for scrap.	
5606	61522	October 1930	Sold for scrap.	
5607	61523	October 1930	Sold for scrap.	Received booster that added 13,200 lbs of tractive effort.
5608	N/A	September 1936	Sold for scrap.	
5609	N/A	September 1936	Sold for scrap.	
5610	N/A	October 1936	Sold for scrap.	
5611	N/A	June 1937	Sold for scrap.	
5612	N/A	June 1937	Sold for scrap.	
5613	N/A	July 1937	Sold for scrap.	
5614	N/A	July 1937	Retired September 1957, on display in a city park in St. Joseph, Missouri.	Converted to oil burning O-5B.
5615	N/A	August 1937	Sold for scrap.	
5616	N/A	August 1937	Sold for scrap.	
5617	N/A	September 1937	Sold for scrap.	
5618	N/A	October 1937	Sold for scrap.	Pulled CB&Q excursion trains between Chicago, Illinois and St. Paul, Minnesota on July 4 and July 6, 1958.
5619	N/A	October 1937	Sold for scrap.	
5620	N/A	October 1937	Sold for scrap.	Converted to oil burning O-5B.
5621	N/A	July 1938	Sold for scrap.	
5622	N/A	August 1938	Sold for scrap.	
5623	N/A	August 1938	Sold for scrap.	
5624	N/A	September 1938	Sold for scrap.	
5625	N/A	March 1940	Sold for scrap.	
5626	N/A	April 1940	Sold for scrap.	Converted to oil burning O-5B. Pulled CB&Q excursion trains between Denver, Colorado Springs, and Fort Collins, Colorado on June 9 and June 10, 1959.
5627	N/A	April 1940	Sold for scrap.	Converted to oil burning O-5B.
5628	N/A	May 1940	Sold for scrap.	
5629	N/A	June 1940	Retired 1956 in Lincoln, Nebraska, on display at the Colorado Railroad Museum in Golden, Colorado.	Converted to oil burning O-5B.
5630	N/A	June 1940	Sold for scrap.	
5631	N/A	July 1940	On display at a depot in Sheridan, Wyoming.	Pulled a CB&Q excursion train from Chicago to Savannah, Illinois on October 6, 1957.
5632	N/A	August 1940	Scrapped in November 1972.	Converted to oil burning O-5B. Used in steam excursion program, until November 1, 1964.
5633	N/A	August 1940	Retired 1956, on display at the Douglas Railroad Interpretive Center in Douglas, Wyoming.	
5634	N/A	September 1940	Sold for scrap.	
5635	N/A	October 1940	Sold for scrap.	

== Bibliography ==
- Corbin, Bernard G.; Kerka, William F. (1960). Steam Locomotives of The Burlington Route (1st ed.). Bonanza Books. ISBN 0-517-26195-2.
- Stowe, J. A. (1966). The Northern and the Mike: A Tale of Two Locomotives. Illinois Railroad Club.
- Stagner, Lloyd (1997). Burlington Route Steam Finale. David City, Nebraska: South Platte Press. ISBN 0-942035-38-0.
