= Baltimore and Ohio Railroad EL-5 class =

Class of American steam locomotives

B&O EL-5 class
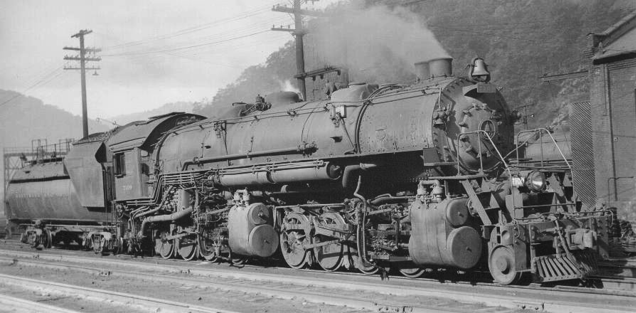
Type and origin
- Power type: Steam
- Builder: Baldwin Locomotive Works
- Build date: 1919–1920
- Total produced: 26
Specifications
- Configuration
  - Whyte: 2-8-8-0
- Gauge: 1,435 mm (4 ft 8 1/2 in)
Career
- Operators: Baltimore and Ohio Railroad
- Numbers: B&O 7145 – 7170
- Retired: 1955
- Disposition: All scrapped

The Baltimore and Ohio Railroad EL-5 class locomotives were a class of 26 articulated 2-8-8-0 "Consolidation Mallet" steam locomotives built by the Baldwin Locomotive Works in 1919–1920, and were large and heavily modified articulated locomotives built for heavy coal drag on the Baltimore & Ohio. The locomotives were in use through World War II and started to be replaced soon after the war by dieselization. The locomotives began retirement in the 1950s with the last unit removed from service in 1955. None of the locomotives were preserved.
