= Type 5 =

Type 5 may refer to:

== Science and technology ==
- Type 5 diabetes, an inherited form of diabetes
- CGMP-specific phosphodiesterase type 5
- Hyper-IgM syndrome type 5
- PDE5 inhibitor, a vasodilator drug

== Military ==
- Type 5 cannon, a Japanese World War II autocannon for aircraft
- Type 5 15 cm AA gun, Japanese anti-aircraft gun
- Type 5 75 mm tank gun
- Type 5 Rifle, alternative name for Type 4 rifle
- Kawasaki Ki-100 (Army Type 5 Fighter) a Japanese land based fighter aircraft of World War II

=== Tanks ===
- Type 5 Chi-Ri medium tank, a Japanese tank
- Type 5 Ke-Ho light tank, a Japanese tank
- Type 5 To-Ku, a Japanese amphibious tank

== Transportation ==
- Peugeot Type 5, a small car
- De Dietrich-Bugatti, type 5 automobile
- Type 5, a British Rail power classification for diesel locomotives
- Cooper Mark II, aka Cooper Type 5, a single seater racing car

== See also ==
- Class 5 (disambiguation)
- Type V
