= Spokane, Portland and Seattle class L-5 =

L-5
Type and origin
- Power type: Steam
- Builder: Schenectady Locomotive Works
- Build date: December 1897
Specifications
- Configuration
  - Whyte: 4-4-0
- Gauge: 4 ft 8 1/2 in (1,435 mm)
- Driver dia.: 69 in (1,753 mm)
- Adhesive weight: 78,000 lb (35.4 t)
- Loco weight: 108,900 lb (49.4 t)
- Fuel type: Oil
- Boiler pressure: 180 lbf/in^{2} (1.24 MPa)
- Cylinders: Two
- Cylinder size: 18 in × 24 in (457 mm × 610 mm)
Performance figures
- Tractive effort: 17,227 lbf (76.63 kN)
Career
- Operators: Spokane, Portland and Seattle Railway
- Class: L-5
- Locale: United States

Spokane, Portland and Seattle Railway Class L-5 was a class of 4-4-0 steam locomotives built in 1897 by Schenectady Locomotive Works.
