= Iron Horse Park =

Railroad repair facility in North Billerica, Massachusetts

Coordinates: 42°34′58.53″N 71°16′0.10″W

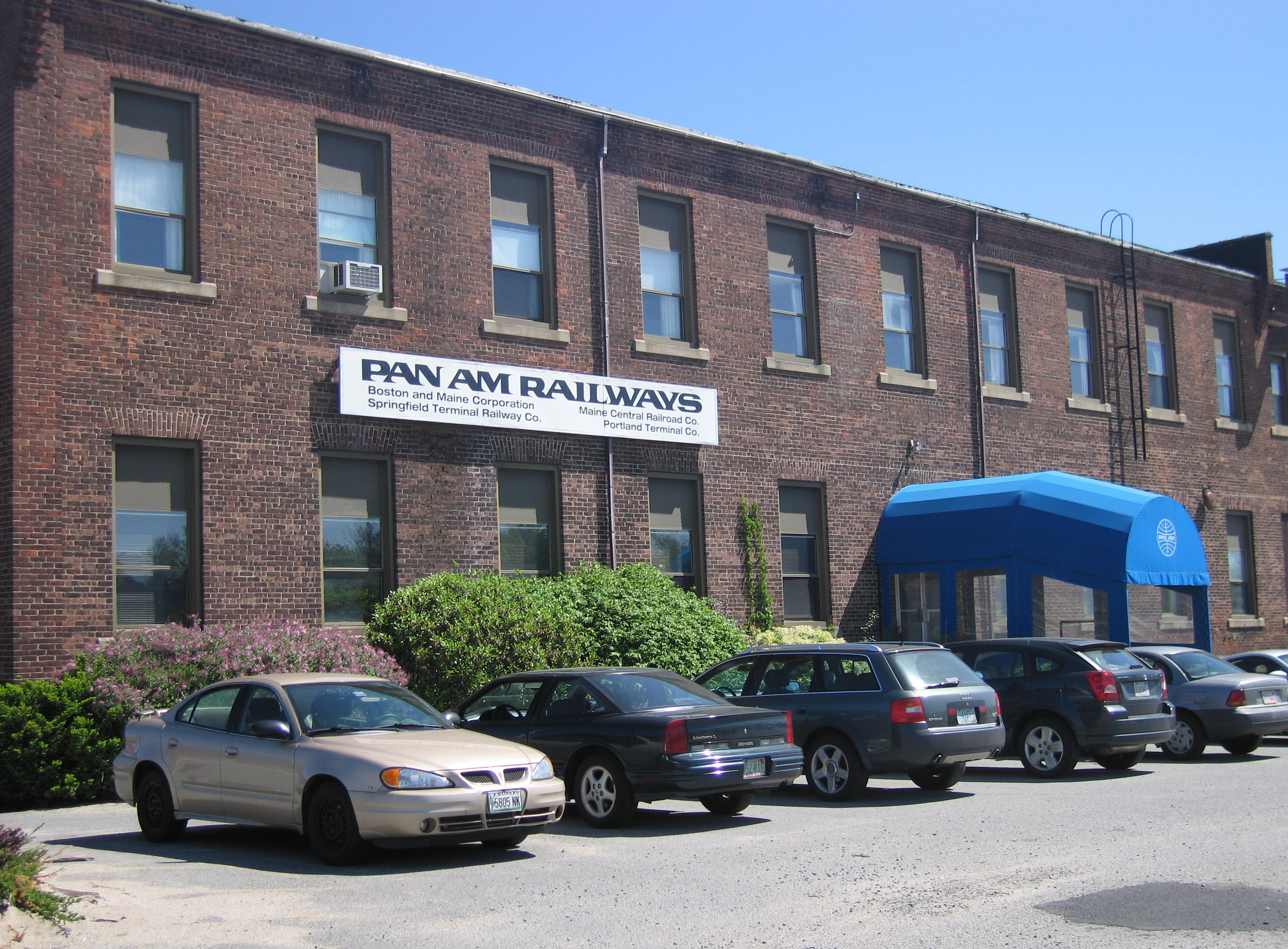
Pan Am Railways headquarters in Iron Horse Park

Iron Horse Park (formerly known as the Billerica Repair Shops) is the name of the former repair facilities of the Boston and Maine Railroad in North Billerica, Massachusetts.

== History ==
In 1913, the Boston and Maine Railroad (B&M) built its repair yards in North Billerica off High Street, which were named the Billerica Repair Shops. This complex expanded into a large industrial park that is now called Iron Horse Park. Pan Am Railways now own the site and still have their main offices in the park, but the old B&M repair yards and buildings are no longer in operation, although the railroad tracks remain in use as there are a couple of rail customers in the park area.

The employees of the Billerica Repair Shops built a small neighborhood behind the old Faulkner Mills along the railroad line, adjacent to the depot, starting in 1904. This neighborhood became known as Garden City because of the large flower gardens the residents would have in their yards. Based on the Garden suburbs in England, Garden City can be considered one of America's oldest suburbs, according to the October 2, 2005, edition of the Lowell Sun. Today, only a few houses still have these gardens, but the old name still remains. Some of the streets in the neighborhood were built on the old track beds of the Billerica and Bedford Railroad where it ran spur lines between the depot, roundhouse, and the loading dock of the old mills.

In the 1980s, the former shops became a Superfund site mostly due to the Johns Manville asbestos operations which began in 1939.

Occasionally, a small freight train will run down the old Billerica and Bedford track from the depot to the Salem Road Crossing and switch onto the park's spur line to deliver and pick up cars from customers, including The Boston Globe's distribution plant, and exit the park onto the main Lowell Line and return to Boston. Iron Horse Park is the dividing line between North Billerica and East Billerica.

In the 2020s, the MBTA began constructing a new commuter rail dispatching center at the location to replace a facility near Alewife station which would then be redeveloped.
