= KUR EC5 class =

Kenya-Uganda Railway EC5 class; Tanganyika Railway GB class; East African Railways 55 class
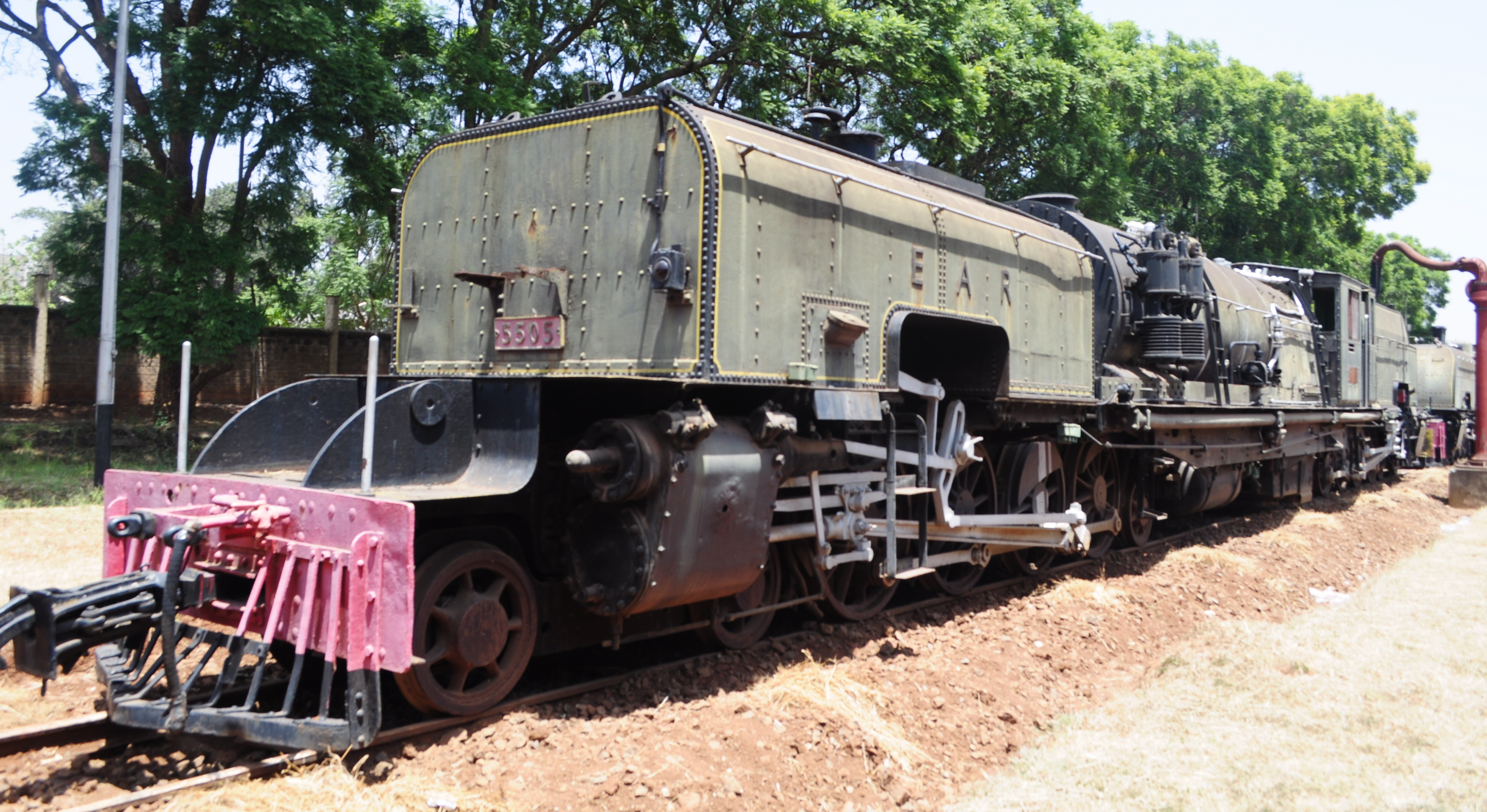
- 5505 at the Nairobi Railway Museum, 2012
Type and origin
- Power type: Steam
- Build date: 1945
- Total produced: KUR EC5 class: 2; TR GB class: 4; EAR 55 class: 2+4+5
Specifications
- Configuration
  - Whyte: 4-8-2+2-8-4 (Garratt)
  - UIC: (2′D1′)(1′D2′) h4
- Gauge: 1,000 mm (3 ft 3 3/8 in)

The KUR EC5 class was a class of 1,000 mm (3 ft 3 3/8 in) gauge 4-8-2+2-8-4 Garratt-type articulated steam locomotives built during the latter stages of World War II by Beyer, Peacock & Co. in Gorton, Manchester, England, for the War Department of the United Kingdom. The two members of the class entered service on the Kenya-Uganda Railway (KUR) in 1945. They were part of a batch of 20 locomotives, the rest of which were sent to either India or Burma.

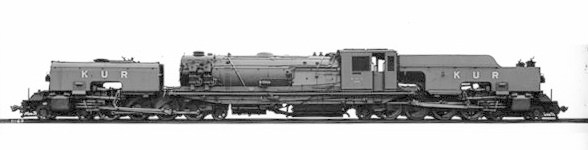
One of the two war department locomotives

The following year, 1946, four locomotives from that batch were acquired by the Tanganyika Railway (TR) from Burma. They entered service on the TR as the TR GB class.

In 1949, upon the merger of the KUR and the TR to form the East African Railways (EAR), the EC5 and GB classes were combined as the EAR 55 class. In 1952, the EAR acquired five more of the War Department batch of 20 from Burma, where they had been Burma Railways class GD; these five locomotives were then added to the EAR 55 class, bringing the total number of that class to 11 units.

== Class list ==
The builders and fleet numbers of each member of the EAR 55 class were as follows:

Builders number	WD number	KUR number	BAR number	WD (India) number	BR number	TR number	EAR number	Notes
7158	74242	120	–	–	–	–	5501	
7159	74243	121	–	–	–	–	5502	
7150	74234	–	690	422	851	750	5503	
7151	74235	–	691	423	852	751	5504	
7157	74241	–	697	–	853	752	5505	Preserved at Nairobi Railway Museum.
7146	74230	–	686	–	854	753	5506	
7155	74231	–	687	–	855/865	–	5507	
7154	74232	–	688	–	856/866	–	5508	
7149	74233	–	689	–	857/867	–	5509	
71??	74238	–	694	–	858/868	–	5510	
7148	74239	–	695	–	859/869	–	5511	

== See also ==
- History of rail transport in Tanzania
- Rail transport in Kenya
- Rail transport in Uganda
