= GCR Class 5 =

Class of British steam locomotives (1897)

GCR Class 5 LNER Class J62
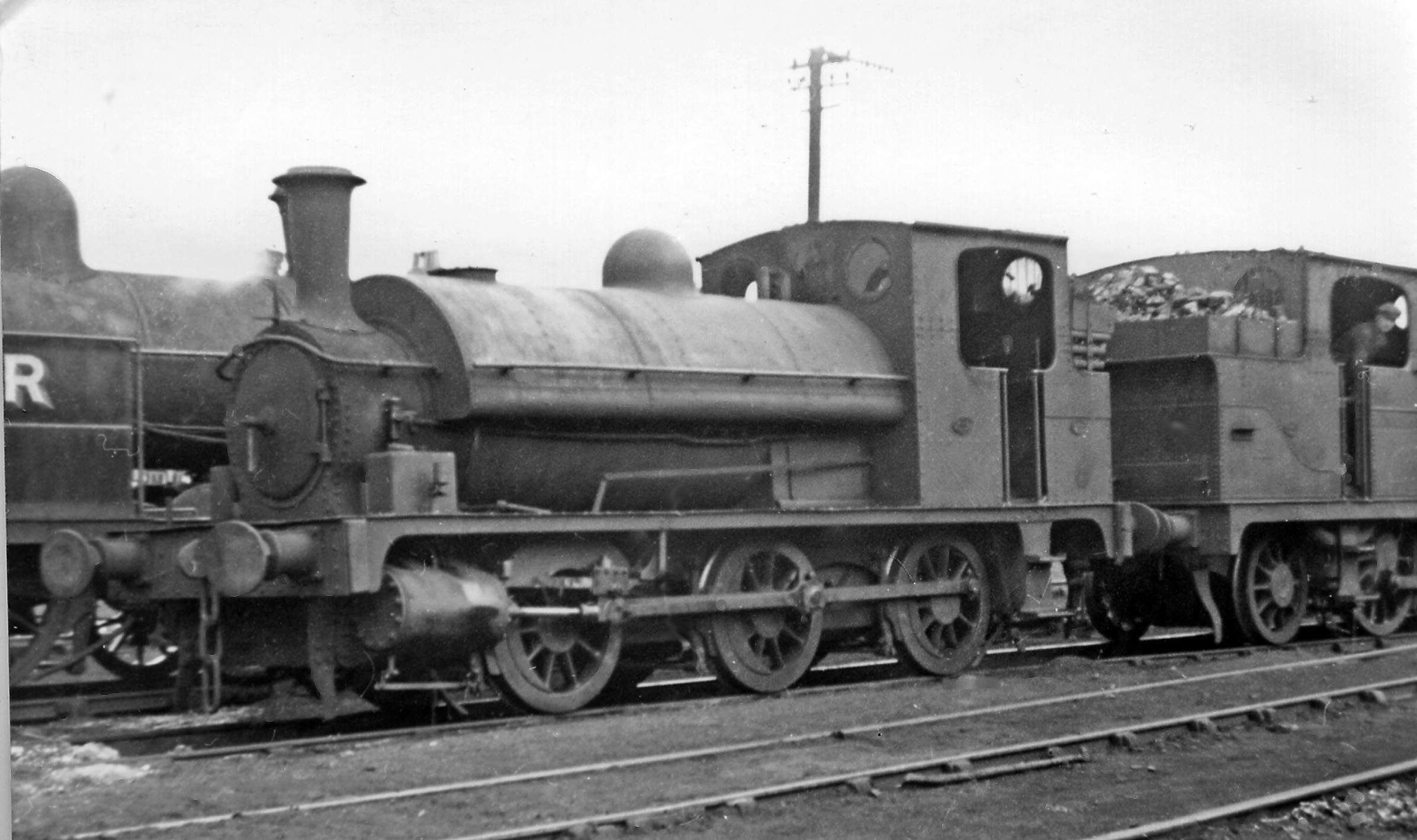
- No. 8201 at Wrexham Locomotive Depot 1947
Type and origin
- Power type: Steam
- Designer: Harry Pollitt (engineer)
- Builder: Gorton Works
- Build date: 1897
- Total produced: 12
Specifications
- Configuration
  - Whyte: 0-6-0ST
  - UIC: C n2t
- Gauge: 4 ft 8 1/2 in (1,435 mm)
- Driver dia.: 3 ft 6 in (1.067 m)
- Wheelbase: 12 ft 0 in (3.66 m)
- Length: 26 ft 11.5 in (8.22 m) over buffers
- Loco weight: 30 long tons 17 cwt (69,100 lb or 31.3 t)
- Fuel type: Coal
- Fuel capacity: 1 long ton 10 cwt (3,400 lb or 1.5 t)
- Water cap.: 600 imp gal (2,730 L; 721 US gal)
- Firebox
  - Grate area: 11.43 sq ft (1.062 m^{2})
- Boiler pressure: 150 psi (1.03 MPa)
- Heating surface: 590 sq ft (55 m^{2})
- Cylinders: Two, outside
- Cylinder size: 13 in × 20 in (330 mm × 508 mm)
Performance figures
- Tractive effort: 10,260 lbf (45.64 kN)
Career
- Operators: Manchester, Sheffield and Lincolnshire Railway; → Great Central Railway; → London and North Eastern Railway; → British Railways
- Class: GCR: 5; LNER: J62
- Nicknames: Dock Tanks
- Locale: Grimsby, Immingham & Mersey Docks
- Delivered: 1897
- Withdrawn: 1935–1951
- Disposition: All scrapped

The GCR Class 5 (LNER Class J62) was a class of twelve 0-6-0ST steam tank locomotives designed by Harry Pollitt (engineer) for work in docks operated by the Manchester, Sheffield and Lincolnshire Railway (MS&LR) later renamed Great Central Railway (GCR).

== History ==
These locomotives were designed by Pollitt for working at Grimsby and other dock locations. (No. 891 was the last engine to be built by the MS&LR, and No. 892 the first engine to be built by the GCR both in 1897.) They passed to the London and North Eastern Railway at the grouping in 1923 and received the LNER classification J62. Withdrawals began in 1935, but there were three examples surviving in 1948 which passed to British Railways ownership. The last example was withdrawn in 1951.

One example (No. 889) was rebuilt in 1903 as an 0-6-2CT but reverted to its original form in 1918 after a collision.

== Bibliography ==
- Allen, D. W.; Boddy, M. G.; Brown, W. A.; Fry, E. V.; Hennigan, W.; Manners, F.; Neve, E.; Proud, P.; Roundthwaite, T. E.; Tee, D. F.; Yeadon, W. B. (November 1970). Fry, E. V. (ed.). Locomotives of the L.N.E.R., part 8A: Tank Engines - Classes J50 to J70. Kenilworth: RCTS. ISBN 0-901115-05-3.
