= Donald J. Russell =

American railroad executive

- Born: Donald Joseph McKay Russell; January 3, 1900; Denver, Colorado
- Died: December 13, 1985 (aged 85); San Francisco, California
- Education: Stanford University, 1917–1920 Loyola University, 1955 (LL.D.)
- Occupation(s): 1920–1941: Surveying, Engineering, Construction 1941: Assistant to President 1941–1951: Vice President 1943: Director 1951: Executive Vice President 1952–1964: President 1964–1972: Chairman of the Board
- Board member of: Trustee Stanford University, Board member of Stanford Research Institute, Regent University of San Francisco, Delta Tau Delta, Sigma Phi Upsilon
- Spouse: Mary Louise Herring
- Children: Ann Russell Miller (daughter)

Donald Joseph McKay Russell (January 3, 1900 – December 13, 1985) was an American railroad executive. He was president of Southern Pacific Railroad from 1952 to 1964 and then chairman from 1964 to 1972. Russell was featured on the cover of Time on August 11, 1961, and Forbes on November 1, 1965.

== Early life and education ==
Russell was born in Denver, Colorado, in 1900. He attended Stanford University, but left in 1918 to enlist in the Royal Canadian Air Force in World War I; during the war, he was badly injured in a plane crash, and subsequently returned to California.

== Career ==
Southern Pacific Service Area by 1918

In 1920, Russell began his career at Southern Pacific as a 45-cent-an-hour timekeeper. From 1923 to 1926, he was in charge of double tracking the railroad line over the Sierra Nevada mountains; in 1926 and 1927, he was in charge of rehabilitation of the railroad line between Grass Lake, California and Kirk, Oregon, and construction of a new railroad terminal at Klamath Falls and Crescent Lake, Oregon.

In 1937 he became assistant to the general manager at Southern Pacific's headquarters in San Francisco; in 1939, he became superintendent of the Los Angeles Division. In this period, he held many executive positions; in 1941, he became assistant to the president of Southern Pacific and subsequently vice president; in 1943, he was promoted to director; in 1951 to executive vice president; and in 1952, he became the organization's president, the youngest since the line's founder, Leland Stanford. On December 1, 1964, he became Southern Pacific's chairman.

One of the most noteworthy events during his tenure was how Southern Pacific handled the so-called "Passenger Problem" during the 1960s. Russell was accused of deliberately sabotaging the service his passenger trains provided so that he could pull Southern Pacific out of the passenger business. Russell said as early as June 1957, "We're going down that road of discontinuing long-haul passenger service with a gradual transition toward the elimination of all passenger service." On the other hand, Robert Jochner, Passenger Department director for Southern Pacific denied this, saying the only reason that Russell downgraded service was not so much to get rid of the passenger trains, but to make sure they made money. Nevertheless, many passenger trains, some very famous, were discontinued under Russell's tenure as president and chairman of the board.

While he was in leadership positions, Southern Pacific began a $3 billion modernization program, which included full locomotive dieselization. Southern Pacific also diversified to non-rail operations, including truck and piggy-back services; petroleum and coal slurry pipelines; and communications services. In 1952, Russell directed rescue efforts for passengers stranded on the City of San Francisco when it was marooned by record snow in the Sierra. Also in 1952, Russell led the reconstruction of 25 miles of line in 25 days after the Kern County earthquake in the Tehachapi Mountains.

Russell also funded research and development; he served as a member of the Stanford University Board of Trustees and was also a long-time board member of the Stanford Research Institute (SRI), and helped connect technical challenges at Southern Pacific with researchers at SRI starting with a project to design a new coupling system in 1954, resulting in the development of the SRI Hydra-Cushion freight car, designed by William K. MacCurdy. Later research would result in the still-used train-tracking TOPS computer system. Russell retired in 1972 and died in 1985.

== See also ==
- List of railroad executives

Preceded by Hale Holden (1932–1939) position then became vacant	Chairman of the Southern Pacific Railroad Board of Directors; 1964–1972	Succeeded by Benjamin Biaggini (1976–1983) position vacant from 1972–1976
