= George R. Henderson Medal =

- Awarded for: Meritorious inventions or discoveries in the field of railway engineering
- Sponsored by: Franklin Institute
- Date: 1924
- Country: United States

The George R. Henderson Medal is an award established by the Franklin Institute in honor of George R. Henderson in 1924, coinciding with a $2,500 fund for the award contributed by his wife. George R. Henderson served on the Franklin Institute's Committee on Science and the Arts from 1912 until 1921. The award was designated to go to individuals who made meritorious inventions or discoveries in the field of railway engineering.

== Notable recipients ==
- 1931, Arthur Newell Talbot, for consideration of his practical development of the railway transition spiral and for his creative guidance of the American Railway Engineering association s tests on structural and track materials for railway building and maintenance.
- 1933, Otho Cromwell Duryea, novel feature embodied in the invention of the Duryea railway-car cushion underframe.
- 1939, Ralph Budd, president of the Chicago, Burlington and Quincy Railroad, distinguished contributions in railroad engineering.
- 1943, Harry M. Pflager, for development of the cast-steel, one piece bed for steam locomotive construction.
- 1950, Paul W. Kiefer, for contributions in the field of railroading.
- 1951, Hermann Lemp, for his contributions to the development of the Diesel Electric locomotive.
- 1952, Alfred Büchi, Swiss engineer and inventor, an authority on Diesel engines.
- 1954, C. Levon Eksergian, outstanding accomplishments in the field of railway engineering.
- 1957, Association of American Railroads, for invention in railway engineering.
- 1959, General Motors Corporation, electro-motive division for developing and mass producing the Diesel-electric locomotive.
- 1964, William K. MacCurdy and William E. Thomford, achievements "in the field of railway impact control and associated car design, with resulting benefits in reducing lading and rolling stock damage".
- 1981, PATCO Speedline, recognized as the outstanding high-speed rail transportation system in America.
