= Pilot Industries =

Pilot Industries was an American company that developed and manufactured fuel and fluid handling systems primarily for the automotive industry. Other products included non-destructive test systems and injection molding equipment. Established in 1977, Pilot's corporate headquarters were in Ann Arbor, Michigan, with technical centers in Dexter, Michigan and in the UK. Manufacturing facilities were located in Dexter, Michigan (2 plants); Manchester, Michigan; Clare, Michigan; Reed City, Michigan; Sterling Heights, Michigan; North Vernon, Indiana; Born, Netherlands; and Saltillo, Mexico.

Among the companies they made parts for were Ford, General Motors, Harrison Radiator Corporation, and Chrysler. A large percentage of the parts were fuel lines for Ford's F-150 and Ranger.

== History ==
Pilot was a plastic extrusion co. Until they acquired R&C Fabricators, Big Rapids, Mi, which was a metal tubing manufacturing co. in 1990.

Due to heat issues with the extruded nylon fuels line supplied to Ford by Pilot, Ford insisted Pilot develop metals manufacturing capability in order to retain their current supplier contracts.

With the addition of metals capabilities Pilot retained the Ford contracts, and Pilot Metal products grew from $100,000 in sales in 1991 to over $35m in sales by 1998. It was not until the mid 1990s that PCap was able to be developed, based on the profitability and success of the Metals Div.

Pilot Industries rose to success based on its patented PCAP tubing under the name of Ed Krause, developed by a team of individuals. PCAP is a multi-layered tubing with Teflon being the inner layer, and prevented fuel vapor from escaping through the walls of the tubing, important for emissions regulations.

On January 31, 2002, the company was purchased out of bankruptcy by Cerberus Capital Management, a private equity firm, and later that year sold to Martinrea International.
