= Pony car =

American car classification

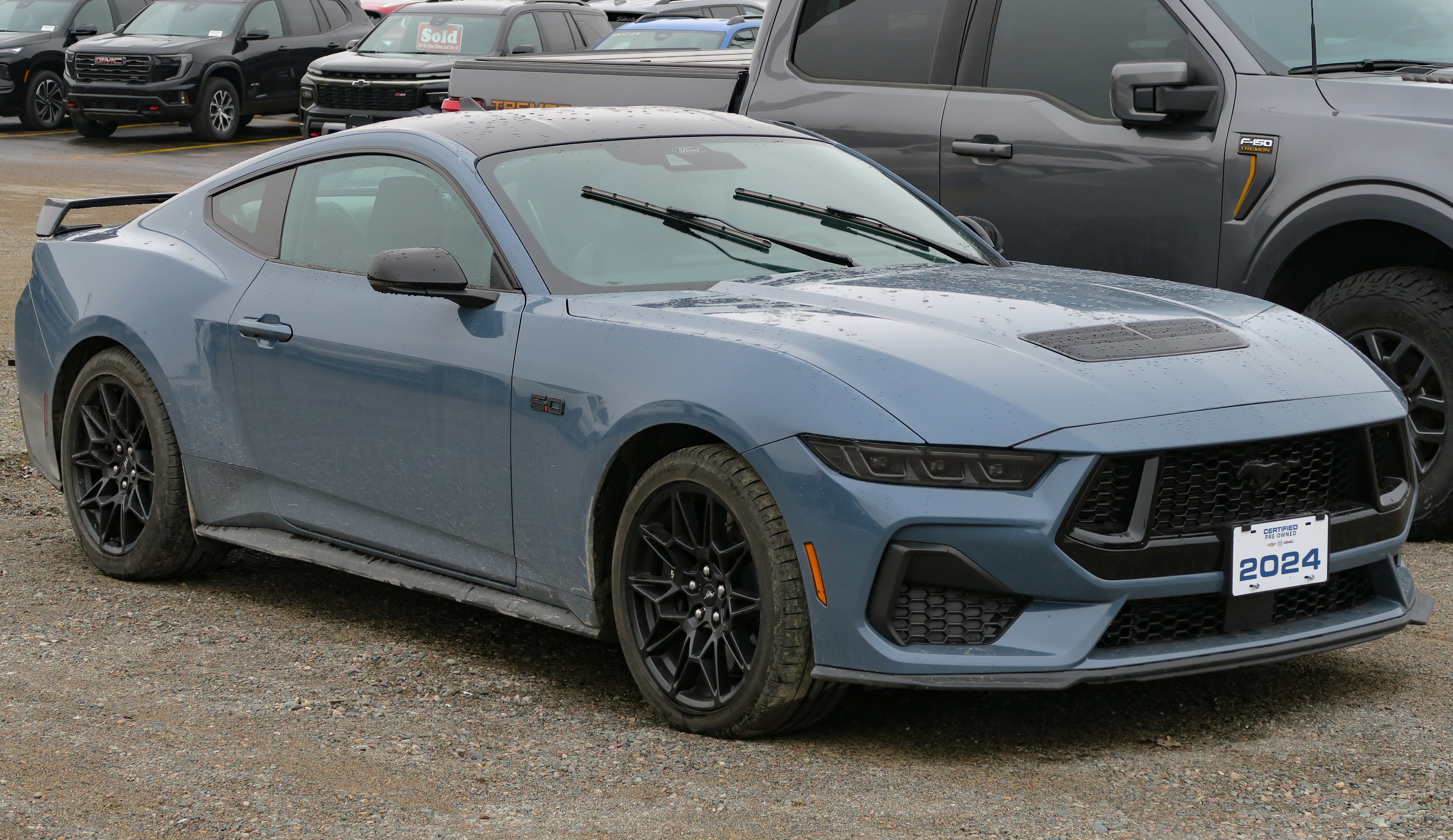
Ford Mustang

Pony car is an American car classification for affordable, compact, highly styled coupés or convertibles with a "sporty" or performance-oriented image. Common characteristics include rear-wheel drive, a long hood, a short deck, bucket seats, room for four, a wide range of options to individualize each car and use of mass-produced parts shared with other models. The popularity of pony cars is largely due to the launch of the Ford Mustang in 1964, which created the niche and term.

There is much debate among enthusiasts about the exact definition of a pony car, and what differentiates the vehicle from a muscle car. The general consensus is that pony cars are smaller and more homogeneous in their form than muscle cars. A few intermediate-size vehicles, such as the Dodge Challenger, may be considered to belong to both categories.

== History ==
=== 1960–1963: Predecessors ===
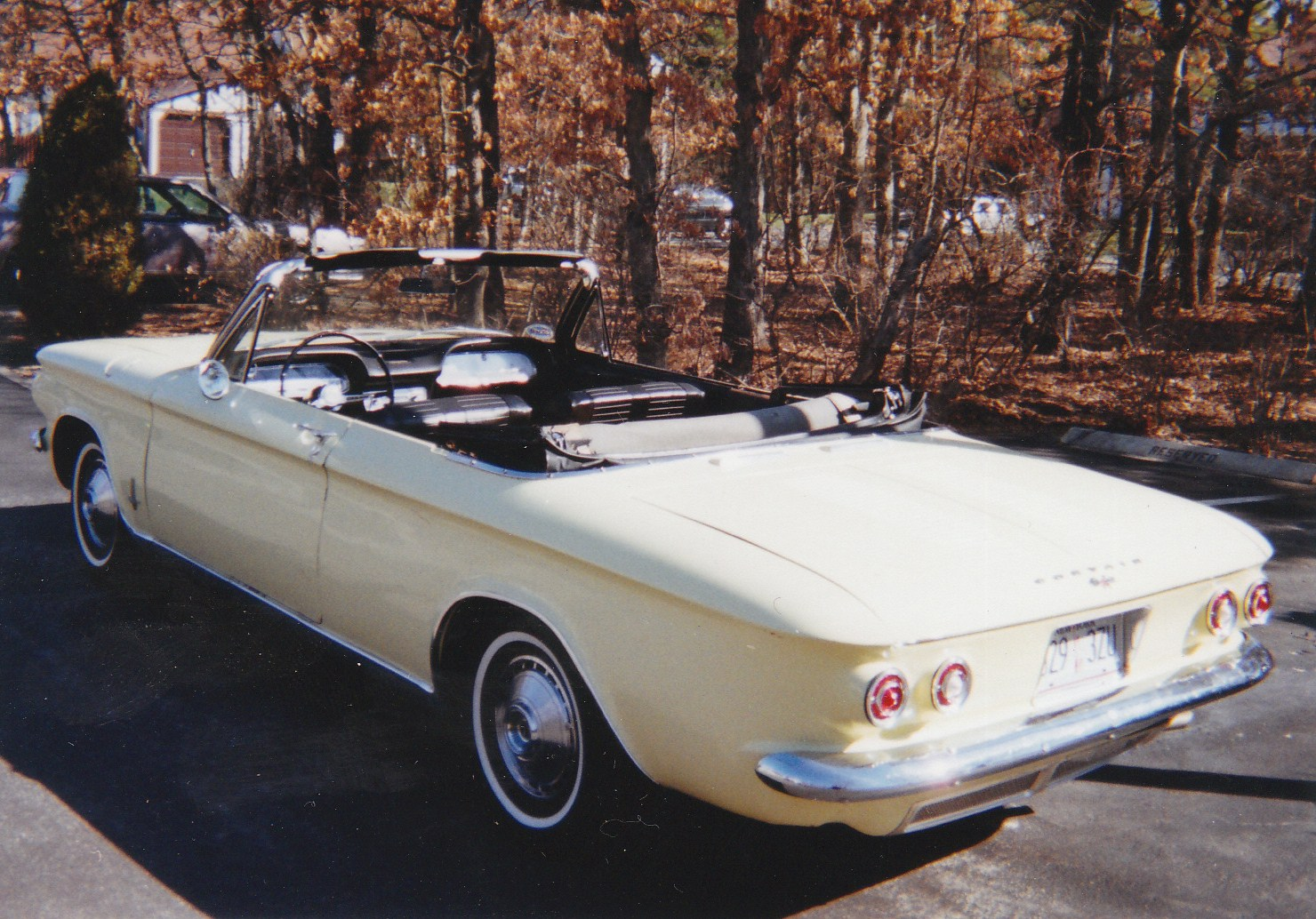
1964 Chevrolet Corvair Monza

In the early 1960s, Ford, Plymouth, and AMC began noticing the rising interest in small, sporty cars, and the increasing importance of younger buyers. In order to convince the management of Ford to approve a small, sporty car for production, the Budd Company built a prototype two-seat roadster called the XT-Bird. The XT-Bird was built using the compact car chassis of the Ford Falcon with a modified 1957 Ford Thunderbird body. Ford rejected the proposal, preferring to design a four-seat sporty car instead which would expand its sales volume.

The Budd Company then approached American Motors Corporation (AMC) with the Budd XR-400 prototype, which was based on a 1962 AMC Ambassador two-door with a shortened chassis and the body moved 16 in (406 mm) rearward to allow for a longer hood (bonnet). The automaker's "management expressed interest in a new car with a sports flair" and work on the AMC Rambler Tarpon, a 2+2 coupe with an elongated fastback roof, began in early 1963.

Examples of production cars that included sporty and youthful appeal include the 1960 Chevrolet Corvair. Initially positioned as an economy car, the Corvair's plusher-trimmed and sportier Monza model sold around 144,000 units by 1961. The Corvair Monza's bucket seats and floor-mounted transmission shifter started a trend toward these features being offered in cars ranging from compacts to full-size cars. Competing models inspired by the Corvair Monza included the Ford Falcon Futura and Futura Sprint models and the Rambler American 440-H and Rogue models. Most sporty compacts were powered by the same economical six-cylinder engines as their more mundane platform counterparts, but in some cases, optional V8 engines were available along with four-speed manual transmissions.

=== 1964–1966: Initial pony cars released ===
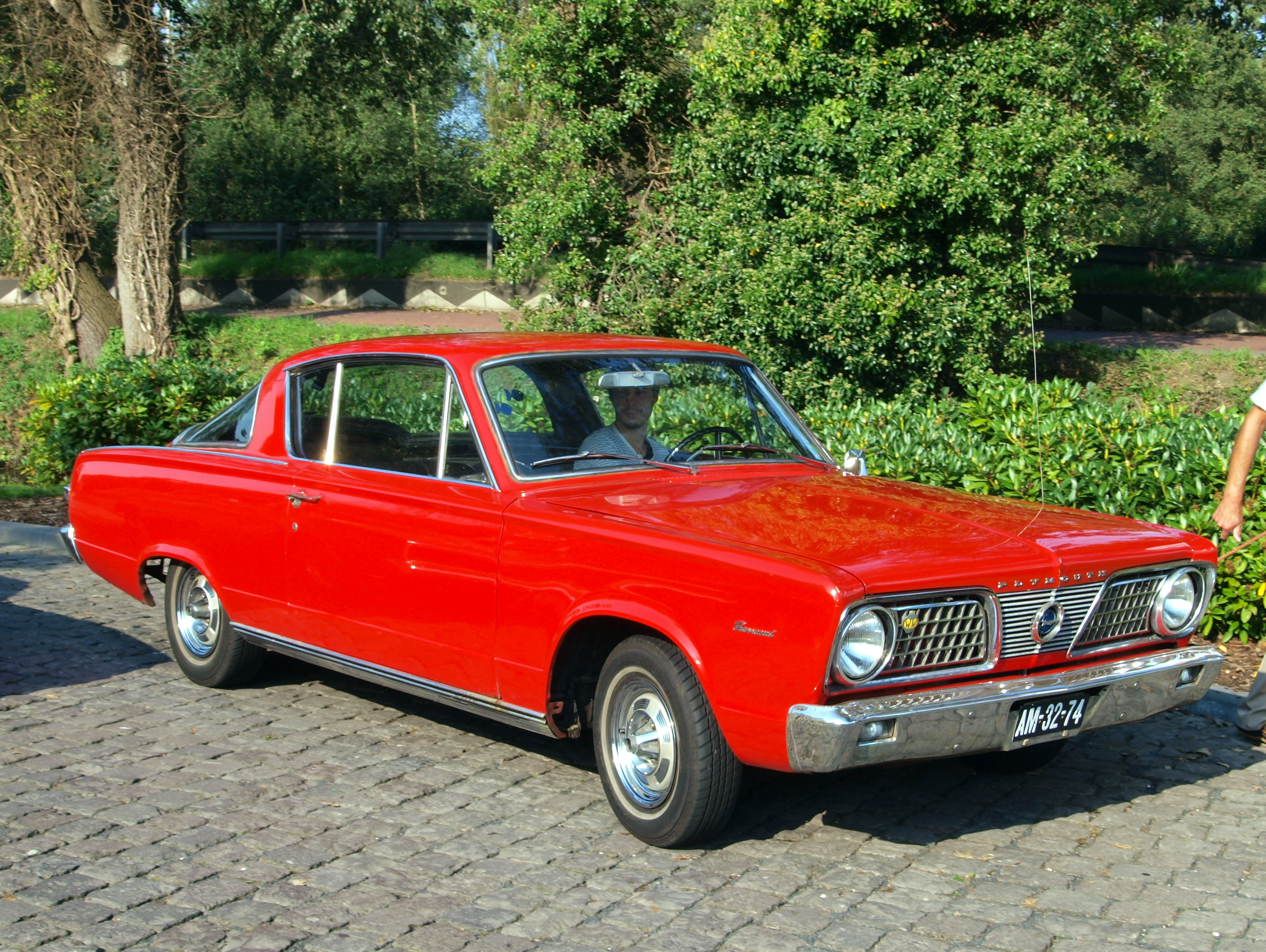
1966 Plymouth Barracuda

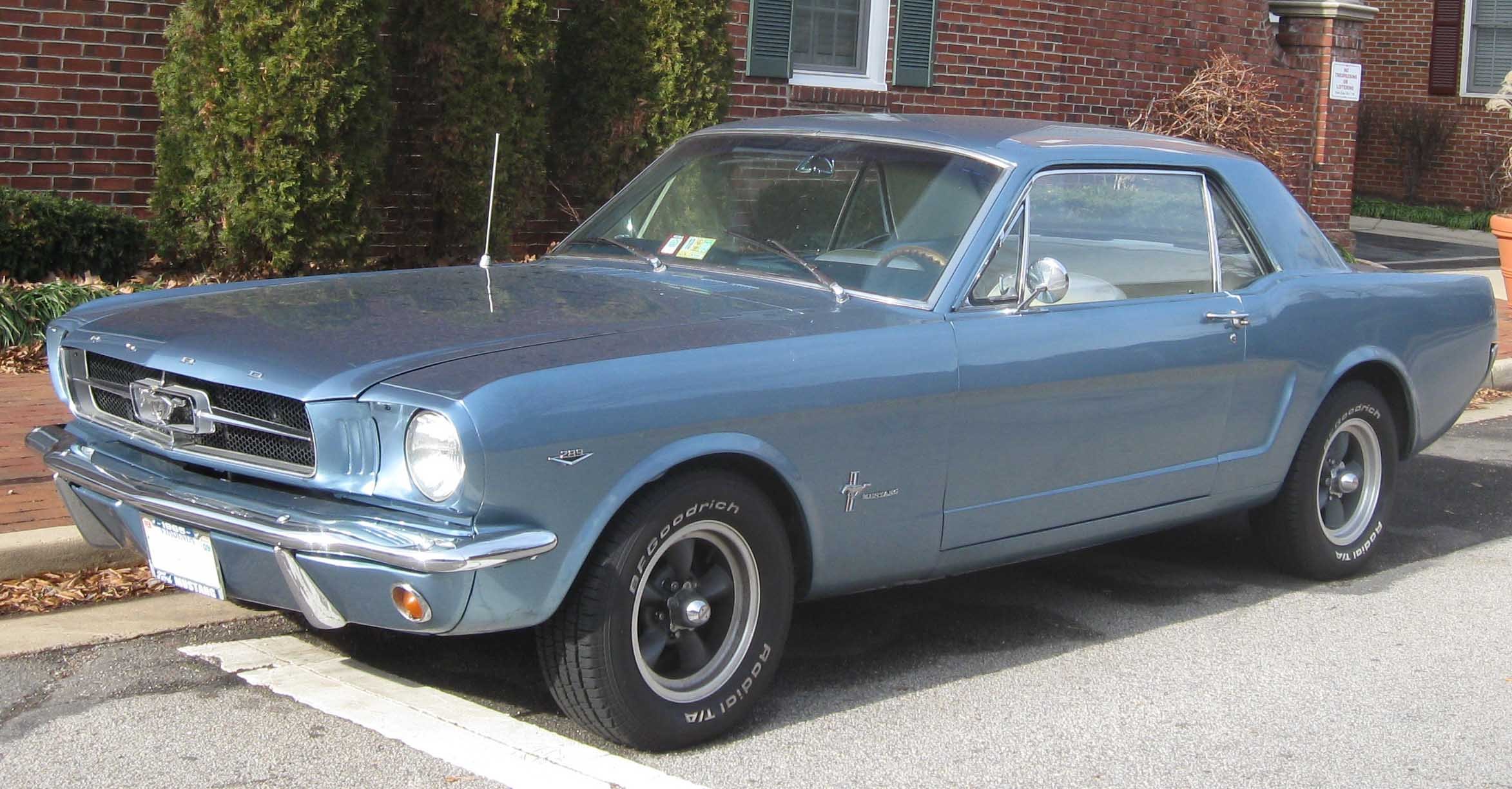
1965 Ford Mustang

The first entry into what would become known as the “pony car” marketplace was the Plymouth Barracuda, which went on sale on April 1, 1964 (two weeks before the Ford Mustang). The Barracuda was released as a fastback coupe, based on the platform of the Plymouth Valiant compact car. Chrysler's precarious financial situation meant that there was a limited development budget for the Barracuda, which led to a compromised design. The Barracuda was criticized for having insufficient distinction from the Valiant and the styling drew mixed reactions. As a result, Barracuda sales were a fraction of the Mustang's.

At the Ford Motor Company, executive Lee Iacocca had commissioned studies that suggested a market for a unique-looking, affordable sporty car. This led to the development of a sporty 2+2 car based on the Ford Falcon platform, launched on April 17, 1964, as the 1965 Ford Mustang. Sporting a long hood and short deck, it was offered as a two-door coupé and convertible. In its base specification, the drivetrain was typical of an economy car: a 170 cu in (2.8 L) six-cylinder engine with a three-speed manual transmission. The US$2,368 base price included bucket seats, carpeting, floor shifter, sport steering wheel, and full-wheel covers. However, desirable options such as V8 engines, a four-speed manual gearbox, air conditioning, and power steering could increase the price by up to 60%, which made such versions very profitable for Ford.

The Mustang was an enormous success, with first-year sales forecasts of 100,000 units being shattered on the first day, when Ford dealers took orders for 22,000 vehicles, forcing the company to immediately increase production. The extended model year sales totaled 618,812 Mustangs. The Mustang broke all post-World War II automobile sales records, "creating the 'pony car' craze soon adopted by competitors."

The 1965 Mustang provided the template for the new class of automobiles. The term "pony car" to describe members of its ranks was coined by Car Life magazine editor Dennis Shattuck. The characteristics of a pony car were generally defined as:

- A sporty compact car for the masses, that could carry four people
- Long hood, short deck profile, and "open mouth" styling
- Affordable base price (under US$2,500 – in 1965 dollar value)
- Wide range of options to individualize each car
- Manufactured using mass-produced parts shared with other models
- Youth-oriented marketing and advertising

While most pony cars were produced with economical six-cylinder or small V8 engines, more powerful V8 engines and performance packages consistent with the “sporty car” image were offered. The most extreme models saw limited sales and were largely limited to drag racing, road racing, or motorsport homologation purposes.

=== 1967–1970: Segment expands ===
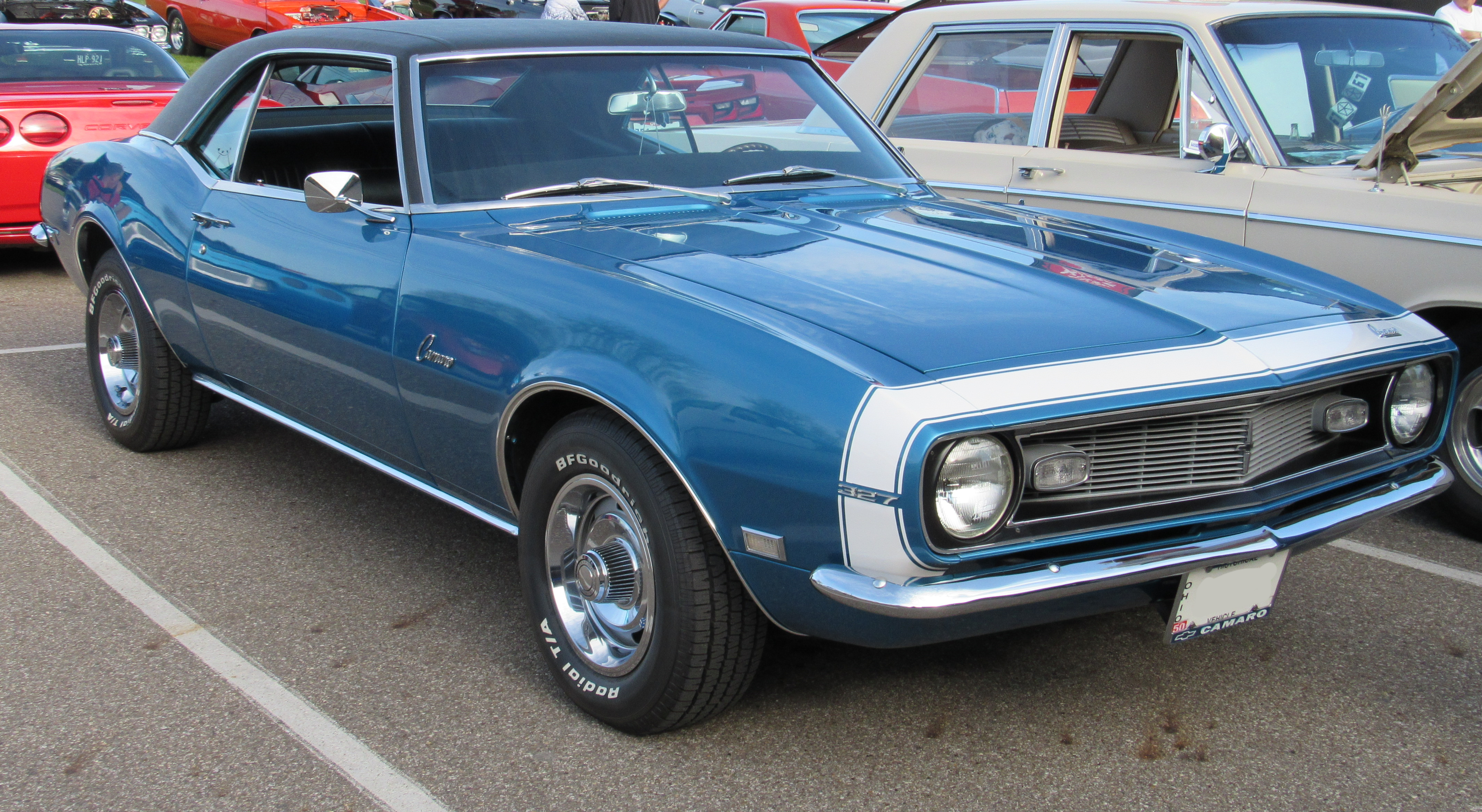
Chevrolet Camaro, introduced for the 1967 model year

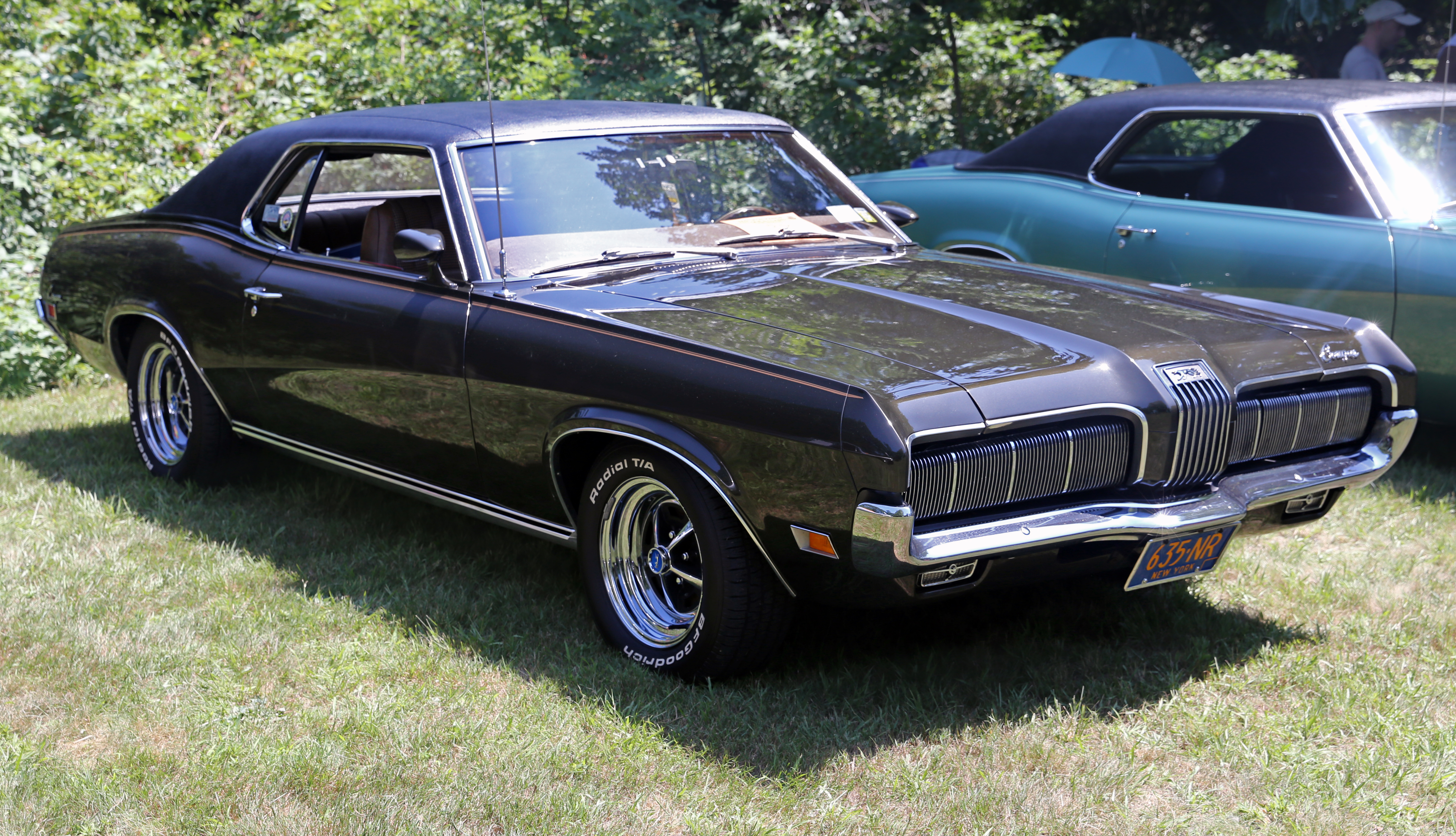
Mercury Cougar, introduced for the 1967 model year

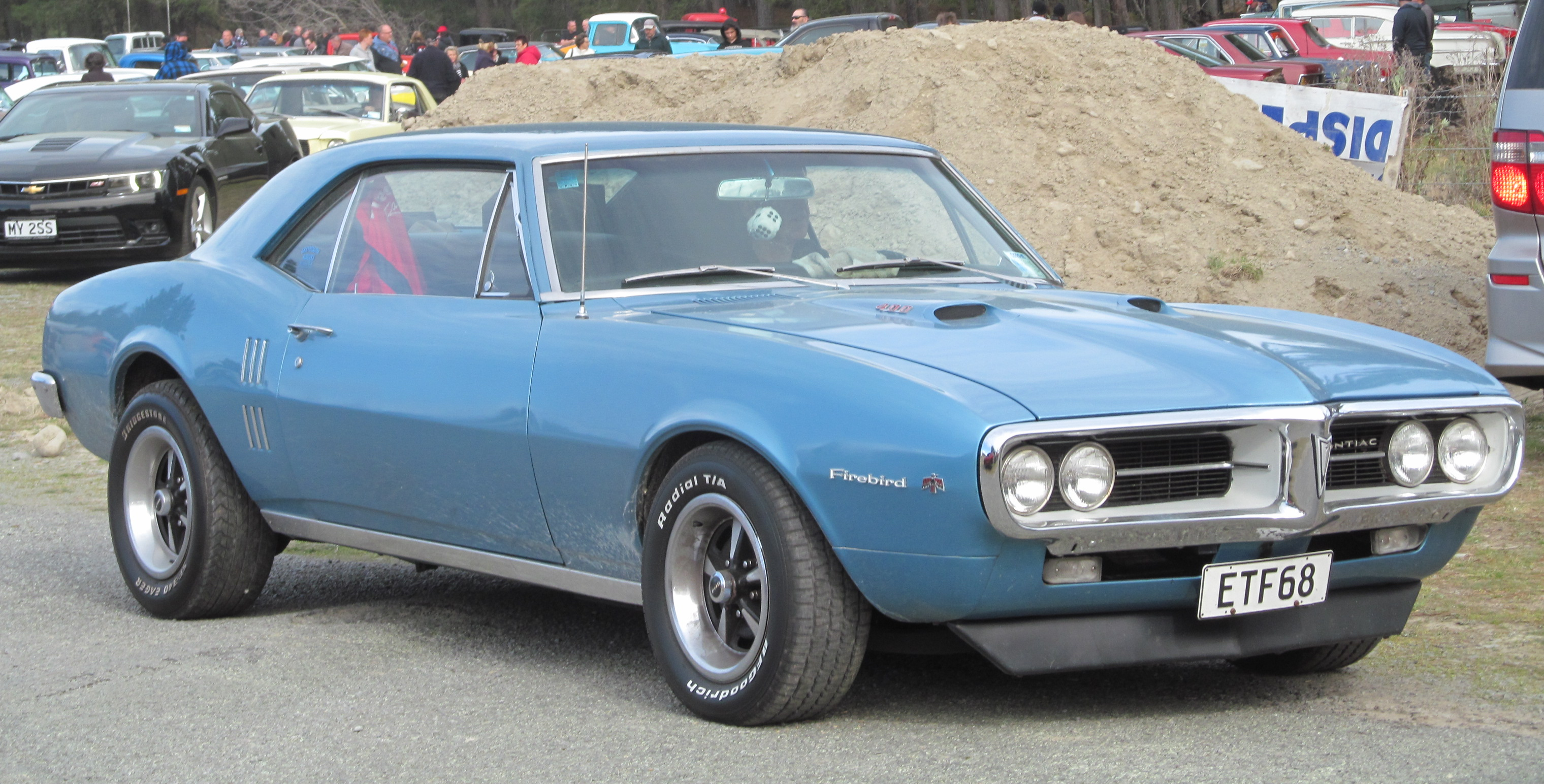
Pontiac Firebird, introduced for the 1967 model year

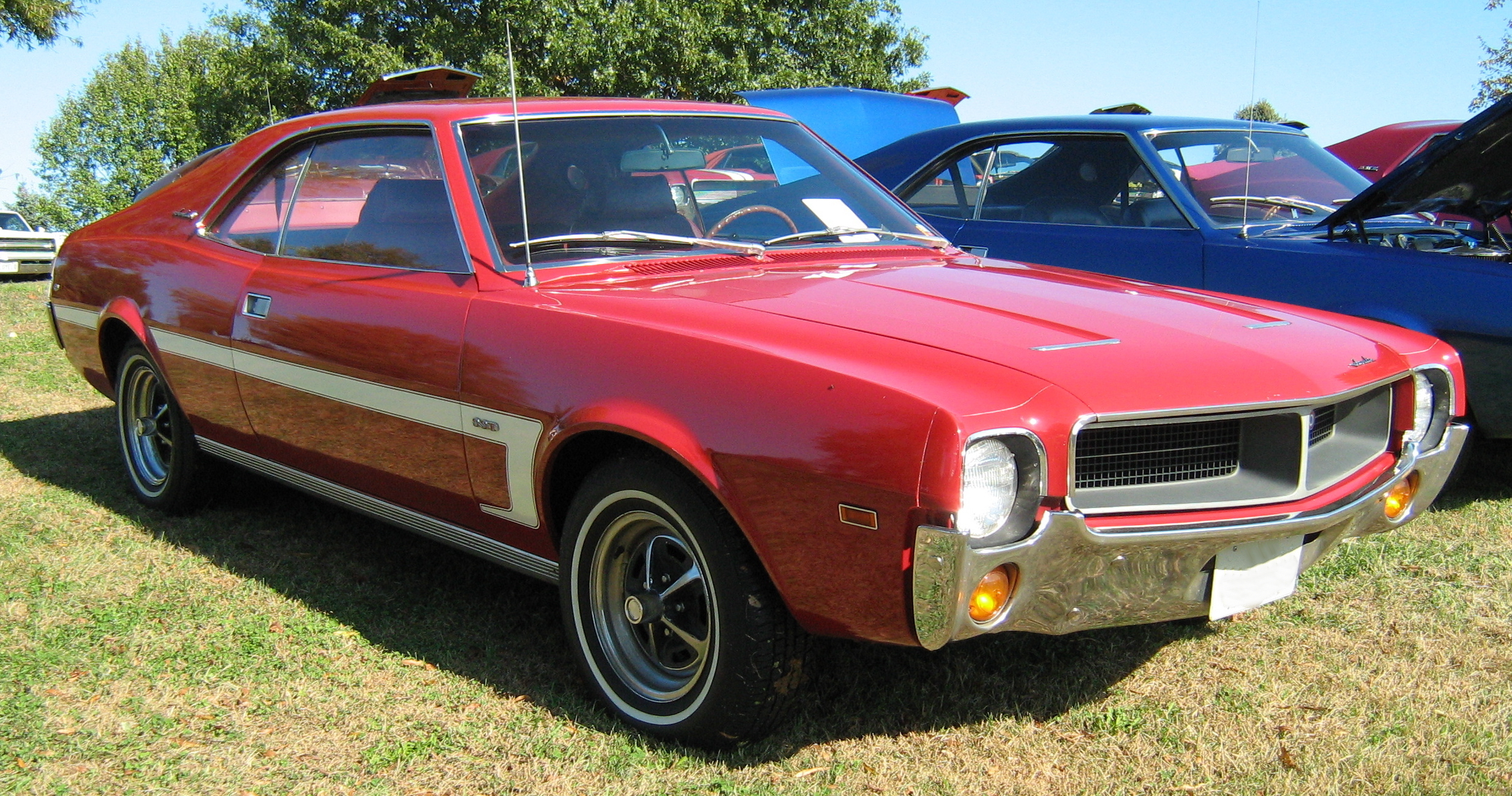
AMC Javelin, introduced for the 1968 model year

Initially, General Motors believed that the restyled 1965 Chevrolet Corvair (a rear-engined compact car) would be an adequate challenger for the Mustang. Initially successful, sales of the Corvair tanked in 1966 due to an infamous handling issue, and as a result, the more conventional front-engine, Nova-based Chevrolet Camaro was introduced for the 1967 model year. A few months later, the Camaro-based Pontiac Firebird was introduced.

The Mustang was redesigned for the 1967 model year and became the basis for the upscale Mercury Cougar on a longer wheelbase.

American Motors introduced its first pony car in 1967 with the 1968 model year Javelin. The car was described as a "roomy, comfortable, peppy and handsome example of a so-called pony car, the type of automobile that's showing up more and more on US highways."

In 1969 the 1970 model year Dodge Challenger joined the already crowded pony car segment. The Challenger was essentially an enlarged Barracuda.

The pony car market segment was maturing and all four domestic automakers were building versions of the long hood/short deck template that Ford had developed. The term pony car applied to all versions of these nameplates, from base models to the high-performance muscle car models, developed in league with factory supported racing to gain a marketing edge. The competition between the manufacturers was so fierce that the introduction and rollout of Trans-Am Series racing from 1966 to 1972 is described as a battle in "The Pony Car Wars".

While sales were strong throughout the end of the 1960s, pony cars' greater value was in generating brand loyalty, particularly among the crucial youth market. In 1970 Car and Driver reported that while very few pony car drivers bought a second, around 50% purchased another model from the same manufacturer. Even so, by as early as 1969 sales were beginning to slide, dropping to 9% of the total market from a peak of 13% in 1967.

Directly inspired by the Ford Mustang, Ford of Europe began production of the Ford Capri in 1968 (using the Cortina MkII platform and driveline and a few components from the Escort), while GM Europe introduced the Opel Manta and Vauxhall Firenza. In April 1970, the Capri began to be imported from Europe and was sold in Lincoln-Mercury dealerships.

The success of the Mustang also inspired the creation of the Toyota Celica compact coupe, which was released in 1970. Toyota had earlier introduced the 1967 Toyota 1600GT 2-door hardtop and installed a DOHC I4 cylinder engine with dual carburetors and a 5-speed manual transmission. Like the Mustang, the Celica was built using the platform of an economy car; although the Celica was 23 inches (580 mm) shorter than the Mustang and did not offer a V8 engine. Several Japanese automakers sold compact coupes in the United States as smaller competitors to pony cars. However, no Japanese manufacturer produced a pony car.

=== 1971–1975: Larger cars, declining sales ===
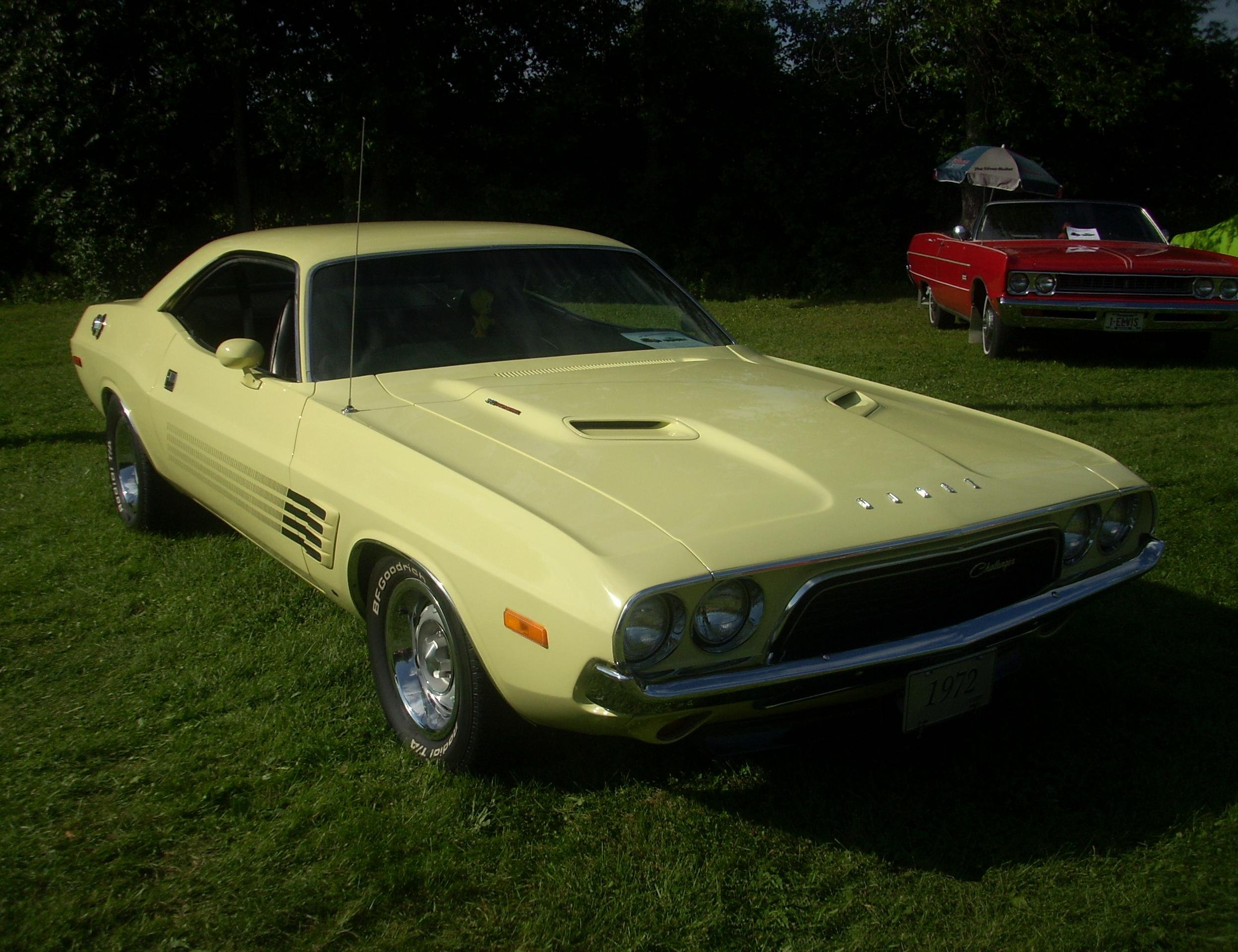
1972 Dodge Challenger

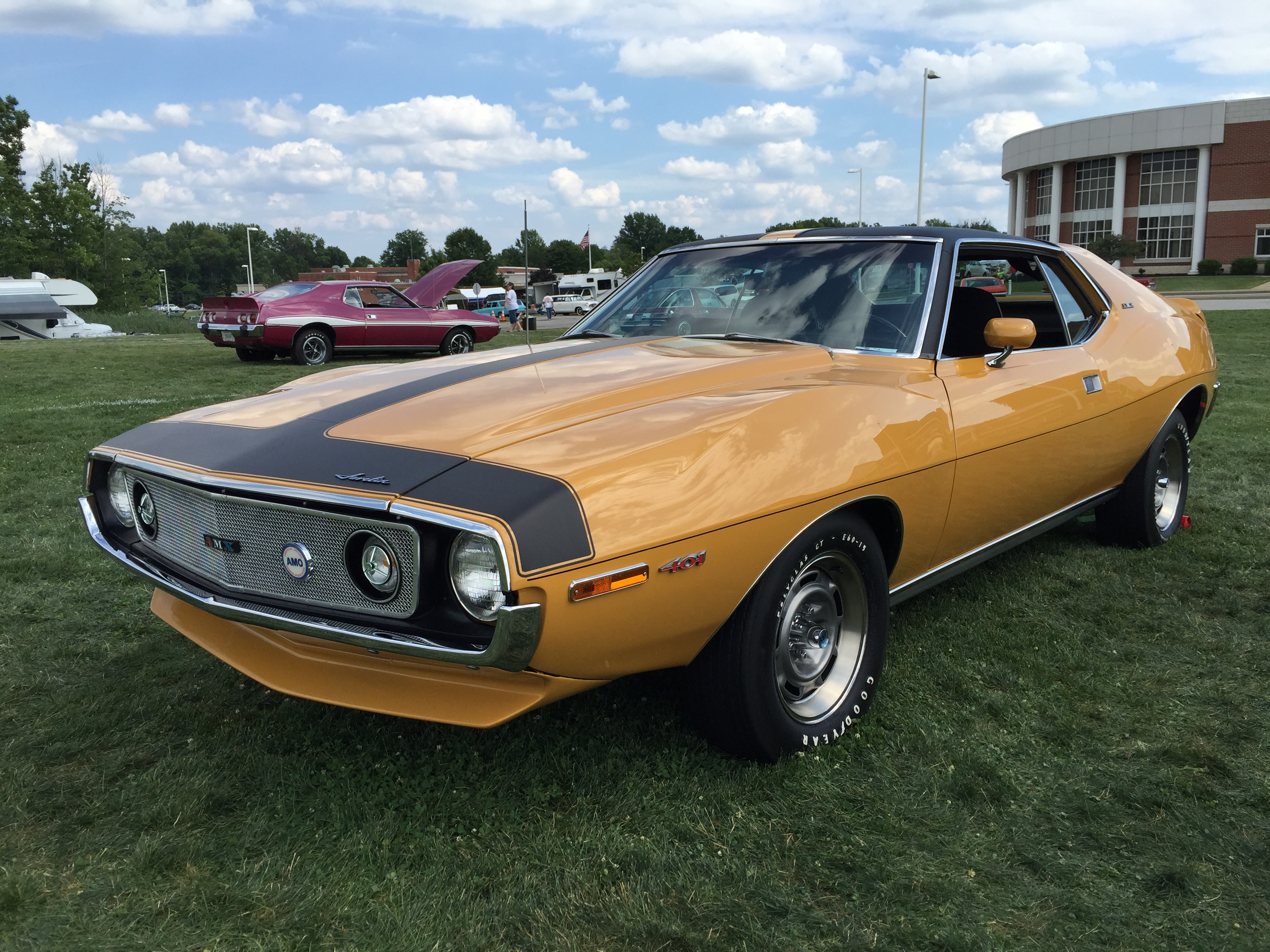
1971 AMC Javelin AMX

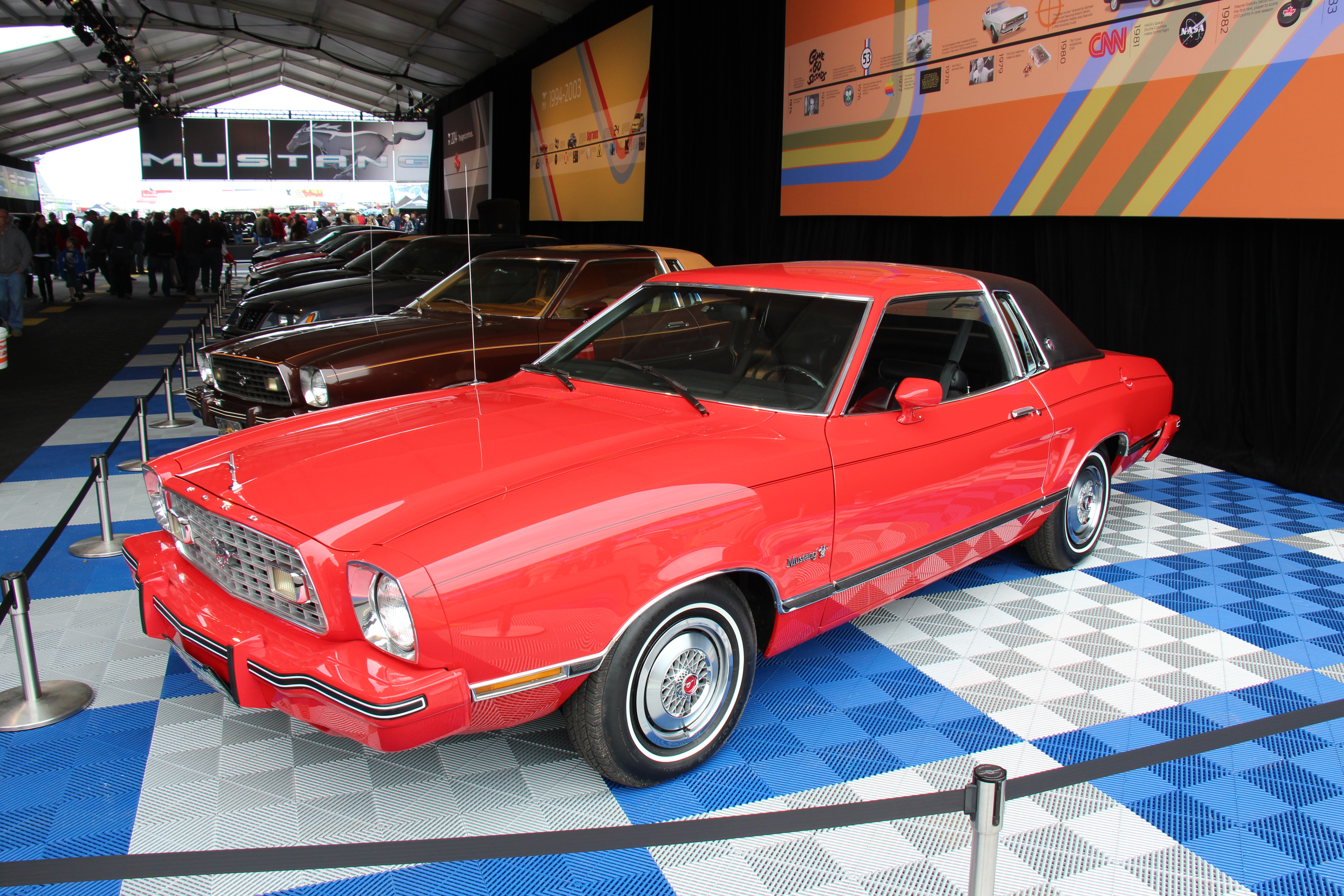
1975 Ford Mustang II Ghia

As with many automobile redesigns, each subsequent generation of the pony cars grew larger, heavier, costlier, and more comfort-oriented. This trend was also influenced by many late 1960s and early 1970s pony car buyers purchasing optional equipment and models with higher prices. Examples of the increasing size and weight of pony cars are:

- The 1970 Dodge Challenger was only slightly smaller externally than the intermediate-sized four-door Dodge Coronet sedan. The Challenger was less than 200 lb (91 kg) lighter than a typical intermediate sedan.
- The 1971 AMC Javelin was 191.8 inches (4,872 mm) long, which is 10 inches (254 mm) longer than the 1965 Ford Mustang.
- The 1973 Ford Mustang was 8.5 inches (216 mm) longer, 5.9 inches (150 mm) wider, and over 600 lb (272 kg) heavier than the original 1965 Mustang.

Big block V8 engines became available in pony cars, which increased straight-line performance but underscored the limitations of the suspension, brakes, and tires. The six-cylinder and lower-specification V8 engines struggled with the increased weight of the pony cars.

By 1970 buyers were moving away from the pony cars, either toward smaller compact cars or the more luxurious personal luxury cars. The pony car market was also hindered by high insurance rates and increased restrictions on performance cars. Since 1968, power outputs of the performance models had been eroding as a result of stricter vehicle emissions controls. By 1972, small imported sports cars were increasing in popularity, and the domestic pony cars were not selling well. Industry observers believed that the Chevrolet Camaro and Pontiac Firebird might be discontinued after the 1973 model year.

The 1973 oil crisis left the large and heavy pony cars out of step with the marketplace. The Mustang, which had grown to become an intermediate-sized car and alienated buyers, was downsized for its second-generation; this 1974 Ford Mustang II was marketed as a fuel-efficient model with luxury or sporty trim packages. Inspired by smaller imported sporty cars such as the Toyota Celica and Ford Capri, the new Mustang II was unveiled a few months prior to the 1973 oil embargo. Ford "decided to call it Mustang II, since it was a new type of pony car designed for an era of high gas prices and fuel shortages." To compete with these new sporty subcompacts, General Motors introduced the 1975 Chevrolet Monza and its badge-engineered variants. GM's original pony cars (the Chevrolet Camaro and Pontiac Firebird) were almost canceled, but remained in production.

Chrysler Corporation did not downsize its pony car models, but instead discontinued the Dodge Challenger and Plymouth Barracuda after the 1974 model year. The AMC Javelin was also canceled after 1974. The 1974 Mercury Cougar—originally designed as an upscale version of the Ford Mustang—left the pony car segment, as the vehicle was upsized and marketed in the personal luxury car segment.

=== 1976–2004: Resurgence of popularity and performance ===
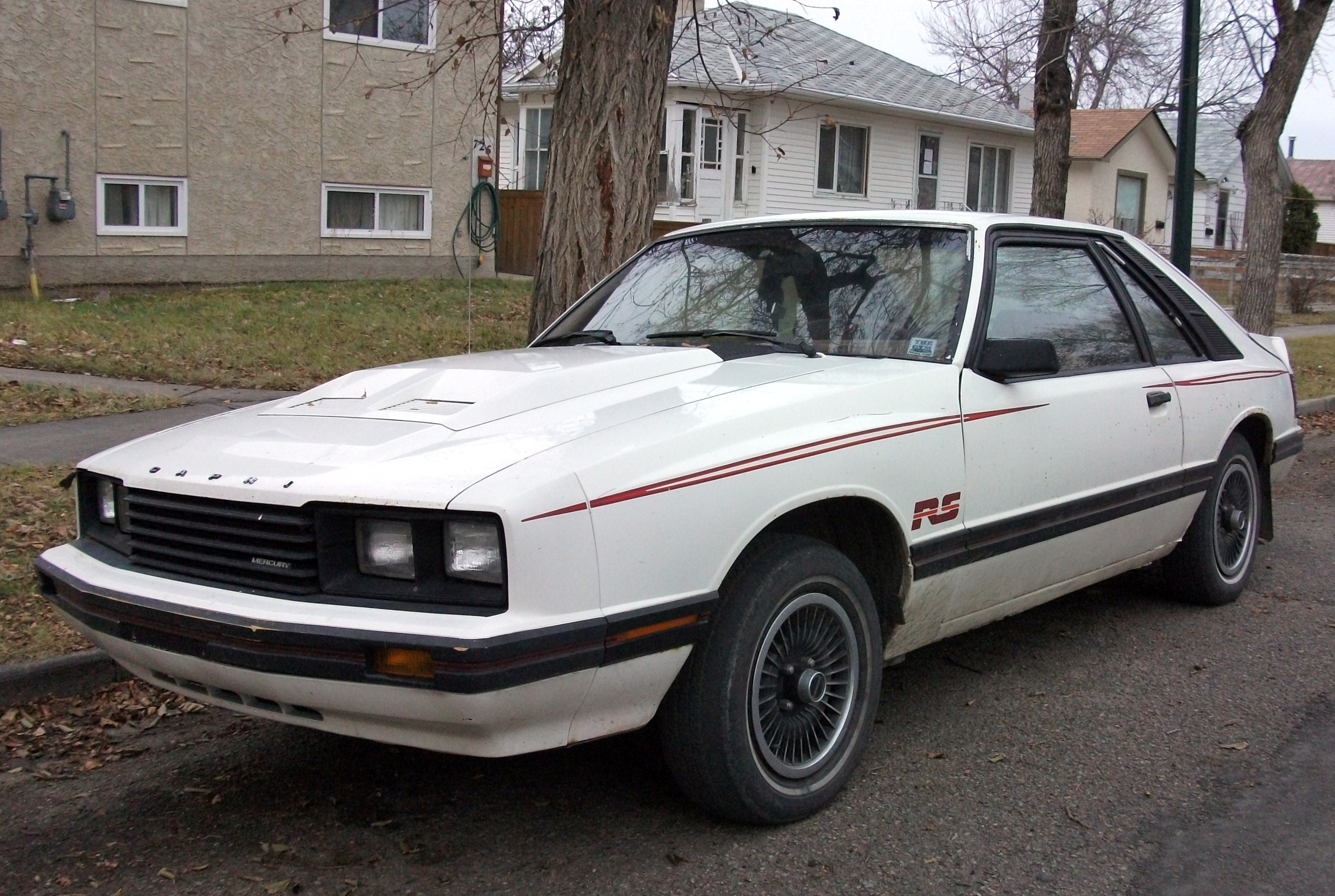
1979–1983 Mercury Capri RS

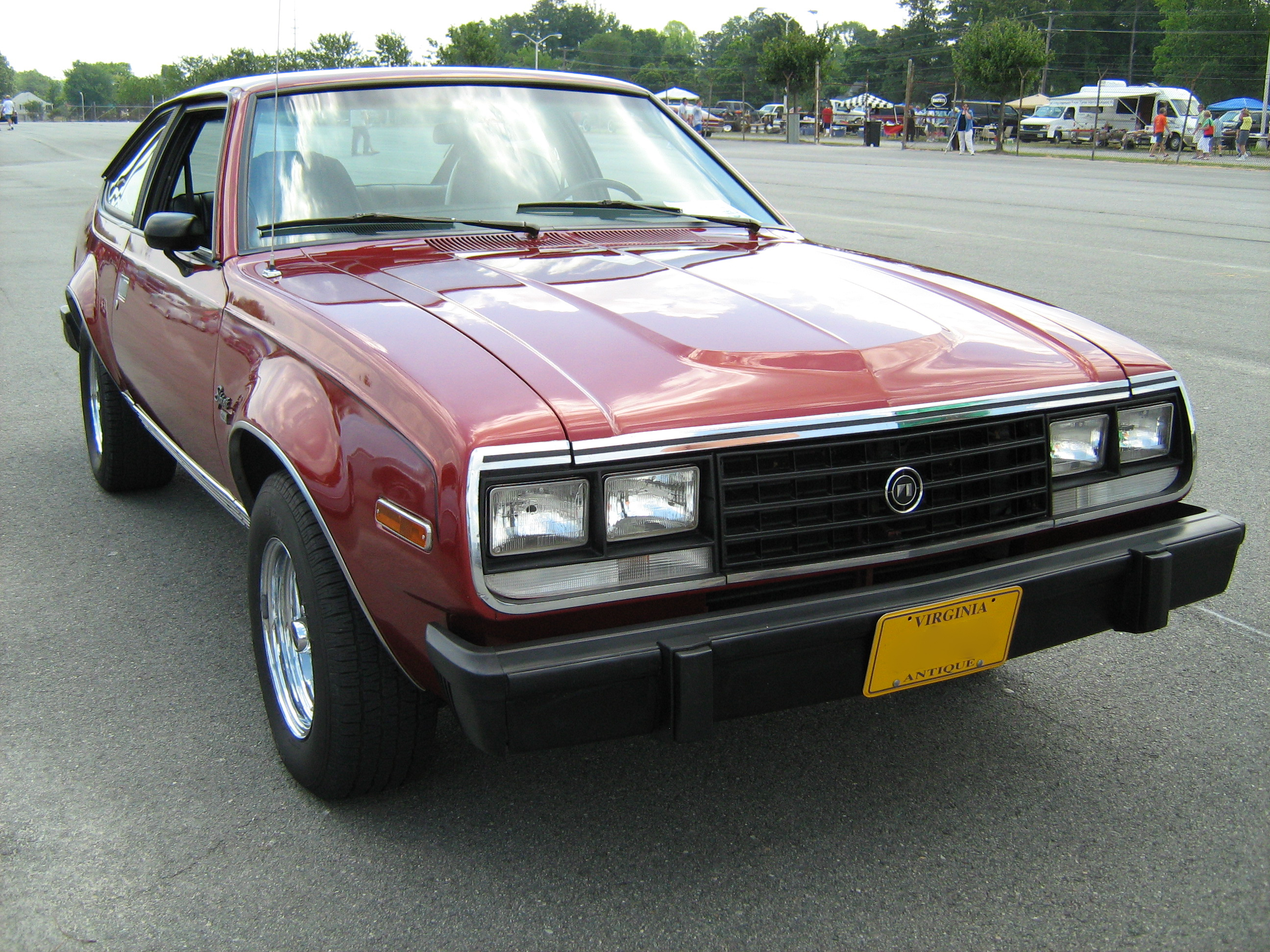
1979 AMC Spirit GT

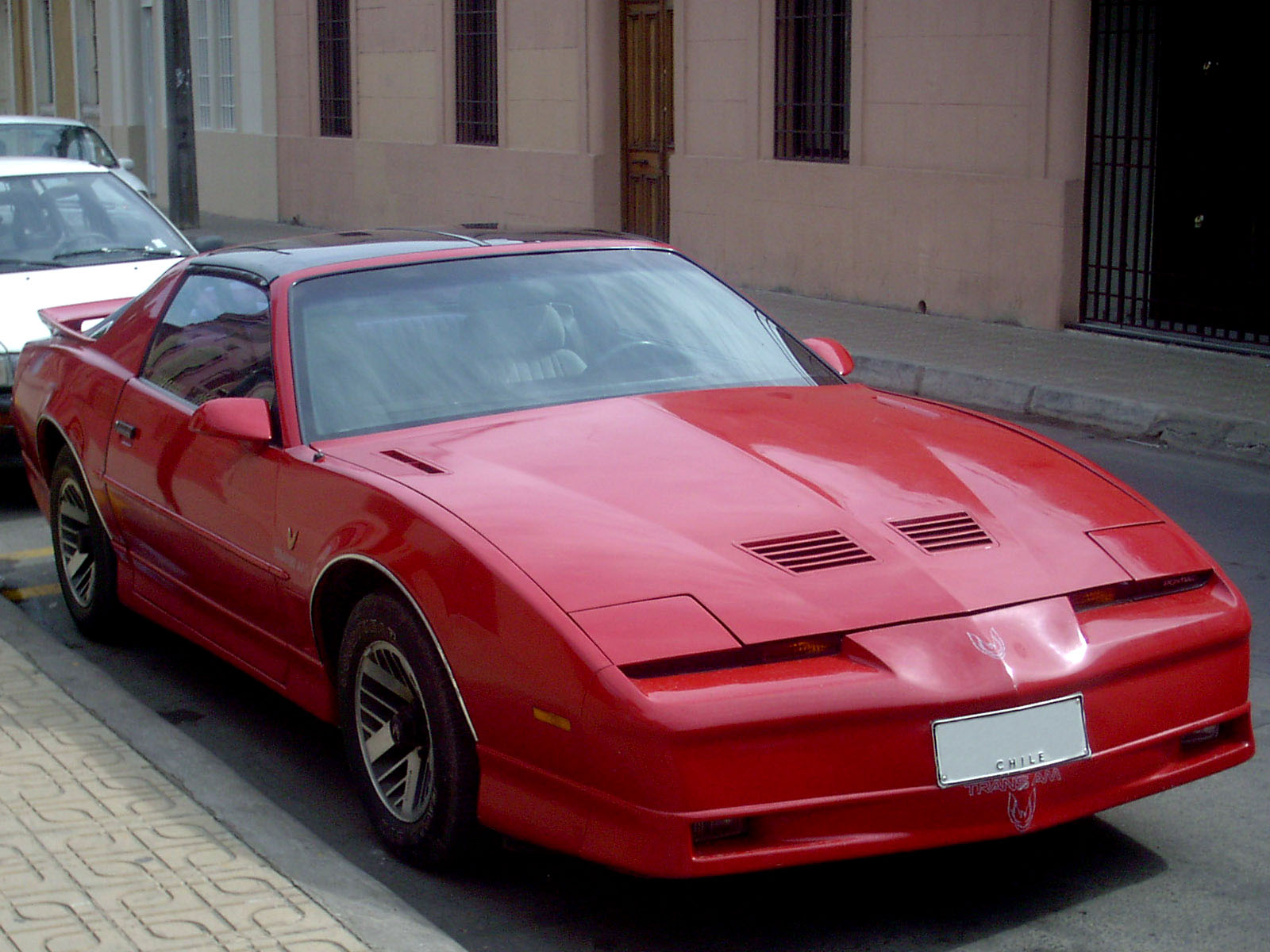
1984 Pontiac Firebird Trans Am

The popularity of pony cars increased in the late 1970s with examples appearing in movies and TV programs like the Pontiac Firebird Trans Am in Smokey and the Bandit, the Pontiac Firebird in The Rockford Files and the Ford Mustang II Cobra II in Charlie's Angels. The "Z28" high-performance option for the Chevrolet Camaro had been discontinued after 1974, however it was resurrected for 1977 due to the popularity of the Pontiac Firebird Trans Am.

The 1979 third generation Ford Mustang was redesigned using the larger Ford Fox platform. The redesigned Mustang also formed the basis of the second generation Mercury Capri, which replaced the European-built first-generation and was now available with a V8 engine.

Chrysler Corporation, beset by financial problems, did not revive the pony car, instead offering smaller coupes such as the Dodge Daytona and Chrysler Conquest (a badge-engineered Mitsubishi Starion) in this market segment.

American Motors Corporation remained absent from the pony car segment, however the 1979 AMC Spirit subcompact was marketed as a competitor to the hatchback versions of the Ford Mustang. The Spirit was available with four-cylinder, six-cylinder, or V8 engines, and the model range included sporty "GT" and "AMX" models. In 1982, the Spirit GT became America's first pony car with a 5-speed manual.

In the early 1980s, concerns about fuel economy prompted Ford to seriously consider replacing the Mustang with a smaller front-wheel drive model (which eventually appeared as the Ford Probe instead). The Chevrolet Camaro and Pontiac Firebird escaped a similar fate with General Motors' front-wheel drive "GM-80" program canceled late in development. Emissions and fuel economy concerns also led the 1982 Chevrolet Camaro and Pontiac Firebird to be available with four-cylinder engines for the first time.

The introduction of fuel-injection on V8 engines in the mid-1980s—such as the Ford "5.0" engine (available in the 1986 Ford Mustang) and the General Motors "LB9" engine (introduced in the 1985 Chevrolet Camaro IROC-Z and Pontiac Firebird Trans Am)—benefitted the pony cars with increased power and fuel economy. However, declining sales and the growing popularity of light trucks and sport utility vehicles ultimately led to the Firebird and Camaro being discontinued after 2002, leaving the Mustang as the only remaining American-built pony car until the 2008 Dodge Challenger was introduced.

=== 2005–present: Retro-style revival ===
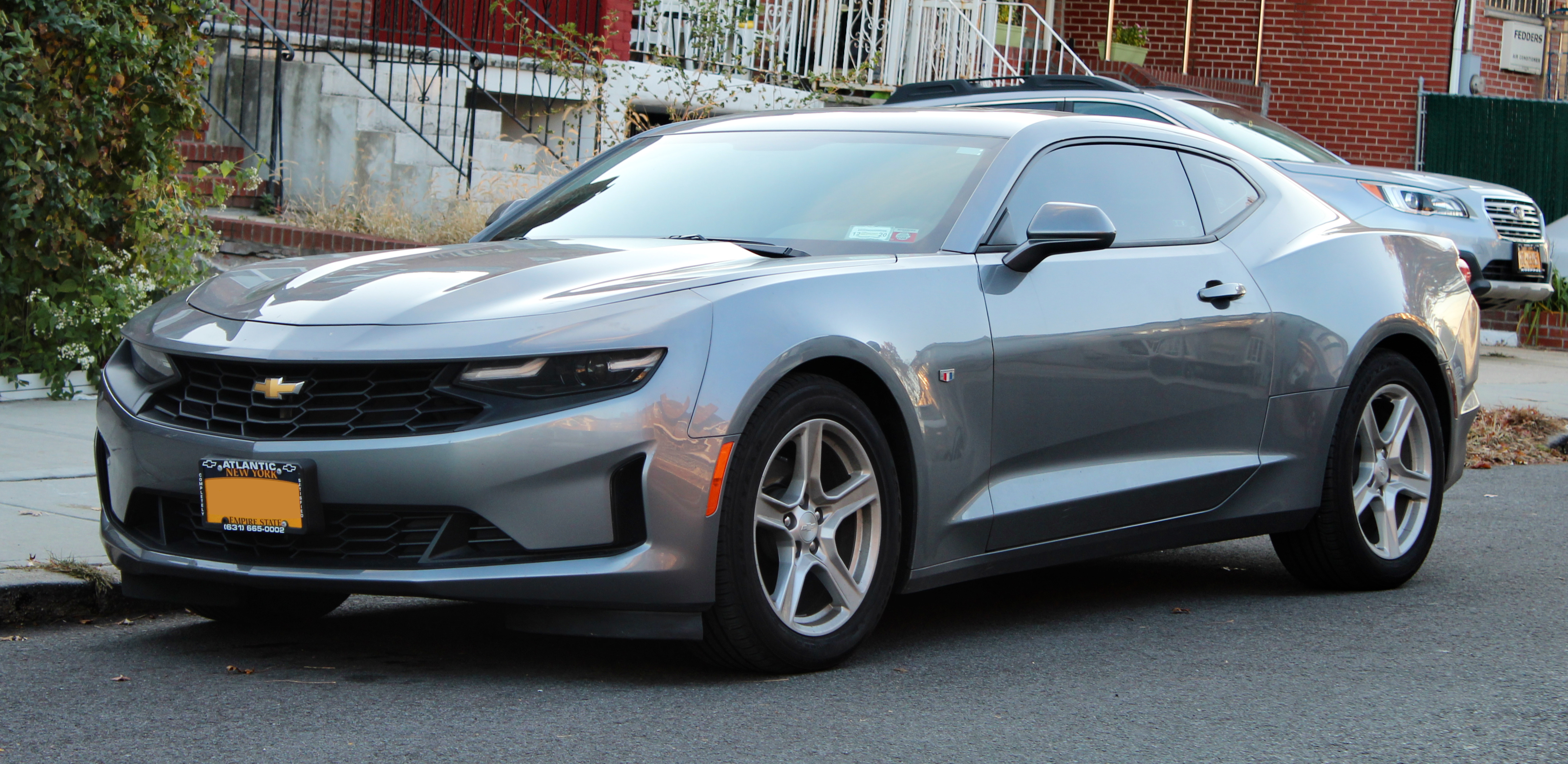
Chevrolet Camaro (6th generation)

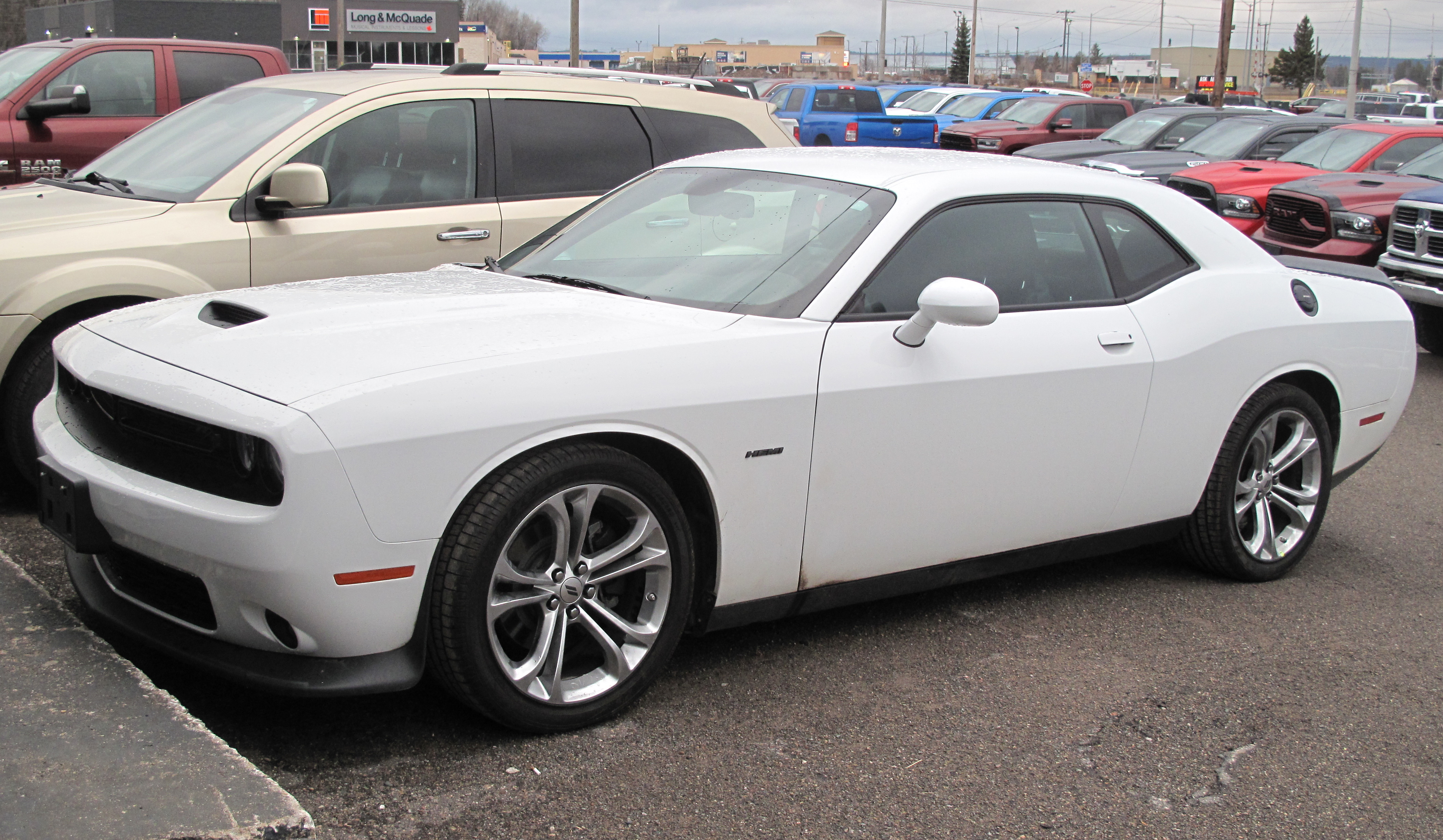
Dodge Challenger (3rd generation)

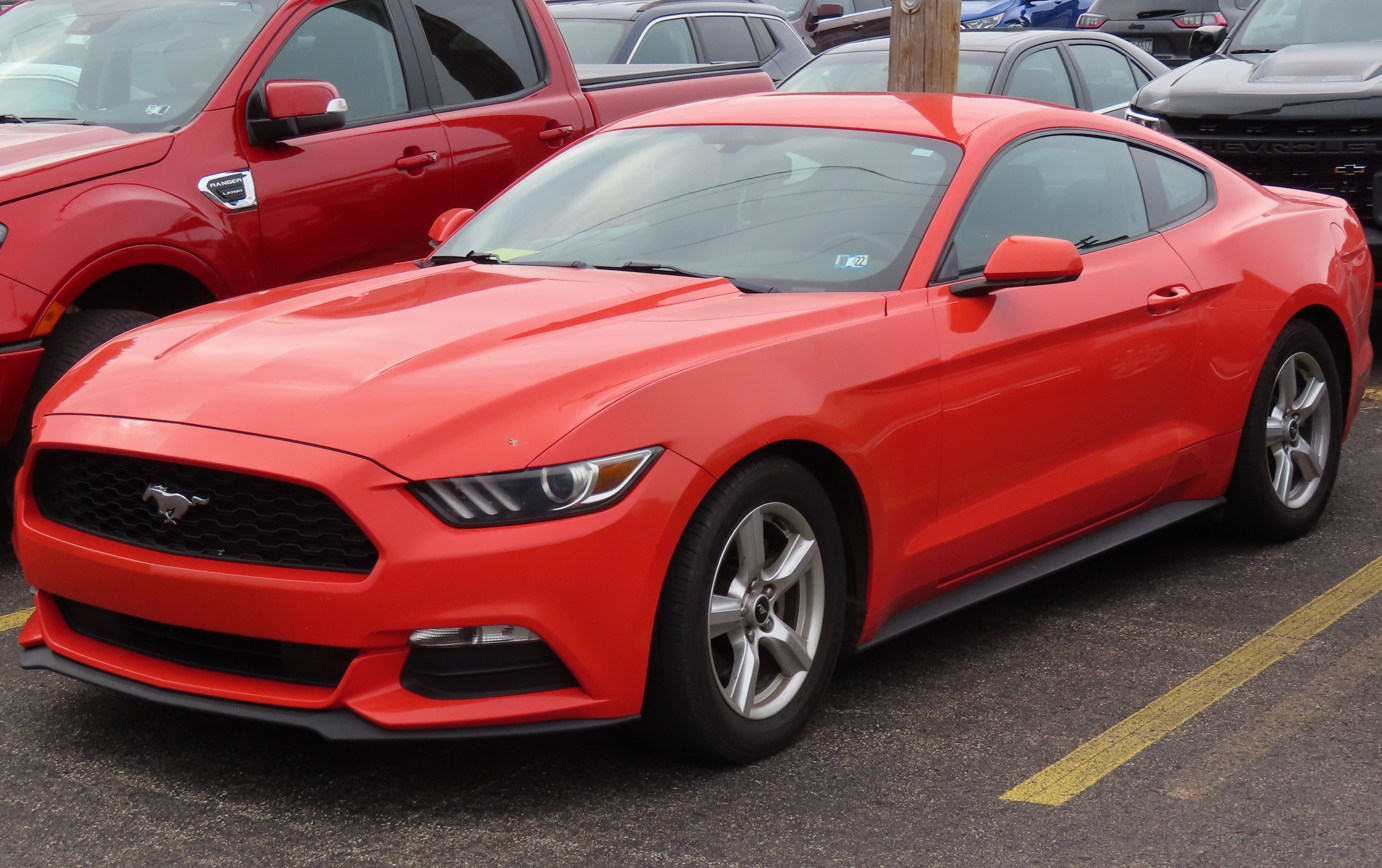
Ford Mustang (6th generation)

Since the 1980s, the dilemma facing car manufacturers in offering pony cars is the lack of mass-produced automobile platforms to use as a basis for building them. Unlike the mid-1960s, the majority of modern compact cars are front-wheel drive with four- or six-cylinder engines, and engineering a dedicated rear-wheel drive performance vehicle platform specifically for a pony car is an expensive proposition.

The 2005 fifth generation Ford Mustang was the sole remaining pony car at the time of its introduction. The success of the Mustang-inspired the 2008 third generation Dodge Challenger to be introduced, followed by the 2010 fifth generation Chevrolet Camaro. Unlike previous pony cars, the Challenger and fifth-generation Camaro were built on the platforms from full-size cars. The Mustang and Camaro were sold in a coupe and convertible body styles, whereas the Challenger was sold only as a coupe.

The next generation of pony cars consisted of the 2015 sixth generation Ford Mustang and the 2016 sixth generation Chevrolet Camaro in 2015. The Mustang was the first pony car with independent rear suspension, a turbocharged four-cylinder engine, and right-hand drive required for specific export markets. The sixth-generation Camaro was downsized from a full-sized platform to a mid-sized platform more in line with its traditional size.

The first all-wheel drive pony car was the V6-powered 2017 Dodge Challenger GT.

The seventh generation Mustang debuted in 2024. The new generation is very similar to the sixth generation in size, configuration, and options, though it does contain a new trim title the "Dark Horse".

The sixth-generation Camaro will be discontinued at the end of the 2024 model year. However, Chevrolet has stated, "This is not the end of Camaro's story."

The current Dodge Challenger and Charger are expected to be discontinued after the 2023 model year, and replaced with a new, fully electric, retro-styled Charger Daytona, which will most likely be a 2-door coupe similar to the current Challenger. Ford plans to debut the fully electric eighth-generation Mustang in 2028, and GM is considering an electric Camaro coupe as well.

== Vehicles ==
- AMC Javelin (1968–1974)
- Chevrolet Camaro (1967–2002; 2010–2023)
- Dodge Challenger (1970–1974; 1978–1983; 2008–2023)
- Ford Mustang (1965–present)
- Mercury Capri (1979–1986)
- Mercury Cougar (1967–1973)
- Plymouth Barracuda (1964–1974)
- Pontiac Firebird (1967–2002)

== Motor racing ==
There was much competition among the performance versions of the early pony cars, resulting in racing on the street, drag strip, and professional race circuits.

This grew so fierce between manufacturers that Trans-Am Series racing was formed and hotly contested from 1966 to 1972, described as a battle in "The Pony Car Wars".

The 2000s pony car revival also saw a renewed focus on motor racing, beginning with the NASCAR Xfinity Series (then called the "Nationwide Series") in 2010, where the Dodge Challenger and Ford Mustang silhouette racing cars were introduced. Modern pony cars have also competed in the Rolex Sports Car Series, SCCA World Challenge, and the Michelin Pilot Challenge. The Ford Mustang and Chevrolet Camaro have been homologated for Group GT3 racing, and the Ford Mustang was homologated in 2017 for SRO GT4 racing. Pony cars like the Dodge Challenger, Ford Mustang, and Chevrolet Camaro are still used today in the NASCAR Pinty's Series.

== See also ==
- Coupé
- Muscle car
- Sports compact
