= Ann Russell Miller =

American socialite (1928–2021)

Mother Ann Russell Miller O.Carm
- Born: Mary Ann Russell; October 30, 1928; San Francisco, California, US
- Died: June 5, 2021 (aged 92); Des Plaines, Illinois, US
- Other names: Mary Joseph of the Trinity
- Occupations: Socialite, Carmelite nun
- Children: 10
- Father: Donald J. Russell

Ann Russell Miller, O.Carm (October 30, 1928 – June 5, 2021) was an American socialite who left her wealth behind to become a Carmelite nun known as Sister Mary Joseph of the Trinity.

== Early life ==
Mary Ann Russell was born in San Francisco on October 30, 1928. Her father, Donald J. Russell, chaired Southern Pacific Railroad. Her mother was Louise Herring Russell.

She was an only child after the death of her sister Donna when she was young.

== Personal life ==
Russell had dreams of becoming a nun, but instead fell in love and married Richard K. Miller on June 15, 1948. Richard was an heir to the Folger coffee fortune. He was also the grandson of Christian Otto Gerberding "C.O.G." Miller, the founder of Pacific Lighting Corporation, which eventually became Pacific Gas and Electric Company; Richard eventually rose to the vice presidency of that company. She and Richard had a total of ten children.

She became a prominent socialite in San Francisco, holding a spot on 22 organization boards and donating money to various causes. According to a 2005 feature in the San Francisco Chronicle she was friends with Loretta Young, Nancy Reagan, and Phyllis Diller. She held frequent parties at her nine-bedroom San Francisco mansion, and spent her days smoking, drinking champagne, playing cards and travelling around the world on scuba diving trips. Even so, she was a devout Christian and made a pact with her husband that when one of them died, the other would join a religious order. When her husband died of cancer in 1984, Corky Bowles invited her to join him on his yacht, and proposed. She refused as she had already made up her mind that she now belonged with the Carmelite nuns.

On her 61st birthday in 1989, Miller announced she would be entering a convent, left her mansion overlooking San Francisco Bay before it was sold to a member of the band Metallica. She threw a party at the San Francisco Hilton for 800 guests. She wore a flower crown, and carried a helium balloon with the words "Here I am", so that people could find her in the crowd of 800 attendees. She gave away all of her possessions, and boarded a plane the following day to join the Sisters of Our Lady of Mount Carmel based in Des Plaines, Illinois. She announced that "The first two-thirds of my life were devoted to the world. The last third will be devoted to my soul."

Her children's reactions were mixed.

Miller remained in the convent for the rest of her life, rarely seeing her family. According to one of her sons, Mark Miller, "She was kind of an unusual nun. She didn't sing very well. She was frequently late to her required duties around the convent. She threw sticks for the [community] dogs, which was not allowed. Also, she was my mother."

== Death ==
Miller died after complications from a stroke on June 5, 2021, aged 92. She was buried on the grounds of the convent in Des Plaines, Illinois, and her family had a private funeral for her.
