= William K. MacCurdy =

American engineer

- Scientific career
- Workplaces: SRI International; Evans Products Company

William K. MacCurdy was an American engineer at SRI International that developed the Hydra-Cushion freight car for Southern Pacific in 1954. Cushioned rail cars based on his design are still the standard.

== Career ==
MacCurdy joined SRI International in 1952 with a background in shipbuilding; he was previously a naval architect. Donald J. Russell connected Southern Pacific with SRI in 1954, and asked them to design a new rail coupling; in particular, Southern Pacific was concerned with the draft gear, the part that connects the couplings to the rolling stock. In MacCurdy's design, the coupler has an extended connection to the center of the railway car, combined with interleaved fingers at each end of the railway car helping to absorb some of the effects of acceleration.

The theory was tested in December 1954 by modifying an existing car with the technology (initially known as the "Hydra-friction") in Sacramento and placing it into relatively difficult service; the car greatly exceeded expectations. The second iteration, bearing the more widely known name of Hydra-Cushion, was introduced in April 1956, and Southern Pacific built and deployed an additional 350 of these cars in summer 1957. The average damage to freight was reduced to 1/25th of previous values.

MacCurdy left SRI to become chief research engineer in the Transportation Equipment Division of the Evans Products Company, which licensed proprietary Hydra-Cushion technology from Southern Pacidic in 1957.

== Legacy ==
In 1964, MacCurdy and Southern Pacific's William E. Thomford received the Franklin Institute's 1964 George R. Henderson Medal for achievements "in the field of railway impact control and associated car design, with resulting benefits in reducing lading and rolling stock damage". In 1967, Railway Age noted that "The 10th anniversary of the cushion-underframe... has to be one of the most significant anniversaries in the annals of the industry."
