= Budd XR-400 =

Concept car designed by the Budd Company for AMC

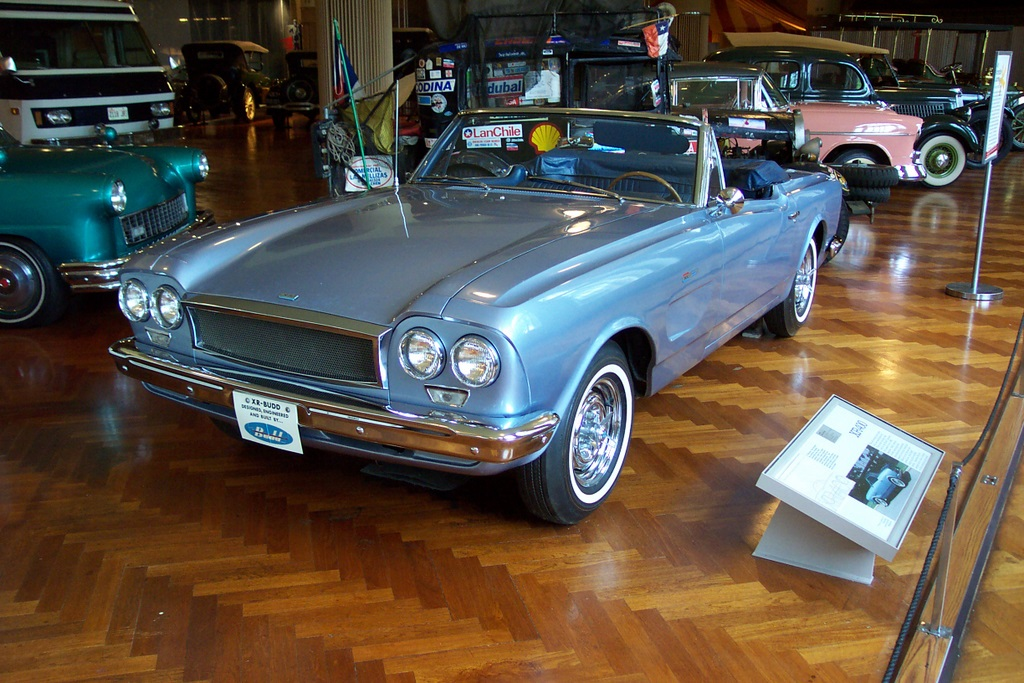

Overview
- Manufacturer: Budd Company

Body and chassis
- Class: Concept car
- Body style: Sports car
- Layout: FR layout

Powertrain
- Engine: 327 cu in (5.4 L) V8
- Transmission: 3-speed automatic

Dimensions
- Wheelbase: 108 in (2,743 mm)

The XR-400 is a fully operational concept car. A "sporty" youth-oriented convertible, it was built in 1962 by the Budd Company, an independent body builder in Detroit, Michigan, for evaluation by the fourth largest U.S. automaker at the time, American Motors Corporation (AMC).

== Origin ==
The XR-400 was developed and constructed by the Automotive Division of the Budd Company. The "X" stood for experimental, and the "R" stood for Rambler. The trunk lid featured Rambler lettering as the intended customer of the car.

The objective of this car was to entice AMC to expand into a new market segment with a low-cost Rambler-based "sports convertible." The Budd Company was a long-time supplier of tooling, parts, and bodies to automakers. Budd also worked with Nash Motors, AMC's predecessor company, to develop the 1941 Nash 600, the first unibody (unitized) automobile body in the United States in 1940, the predecessor of the modern mass-produced car.

Examples of Budd's experiments include the first all-plastic-bodied automobile developed for Studebaker in 1954. This prototype logged thousands of test miles on public roads. Its contracts included the manufacture of Thunderbird bodies for Ford starting in 1955 through 1957. In 1962, Budd proposed to replicate the original two-seat Thunderbird design on a Ford Falcon platform, but Ford rejected the idea. Budd's XT-Bird idea was then redeveloped using an AMC platform and shown to AMC.

Budd's existing business with AMC would increase if the automaker continued development of this concept vehicle. Budd wanted to supply bodies and major sub-assemblies to the automaker for a production version of the new car. Budd estimated that the new model could be available for public sale by October 1963, six months ahead of the Ford Mustang.

== Design ==
The XR-400 was built starting with a two-door 1962 Ambassador chassis. To keep costs down, Budd engineers kept the front of the unit body with the suspension in its existing position, but moved the floor pan 16.24 in (412 mm) rearward and shortened it by 14.3 in (363 mm). The result was a longer front end and a shorter passenger area. The engine's position was lowered by two inches (51 mm) with new rear mounts. The radiator was moved down 3.5 inches (89 mm). The fan blades were shortened, as was the oil-filler neck. The air cleaner was relocated, the exhaust system was reshaped, and the gas tank was new.

The XR-400's long nose was achieved by extending the front section and adding a cowl behind it that held the battery. The car was styled by Budd with a relatively clean and uncluttered body, giving little indication of its Rambler sedan origin. A double crease in the beltline suggested a family relationship to the contemporary styling of Rambler's large-sized cars.

The proposed model was a true 2+2 (two front bucket seats plus limited-use seats for two back passengers), sleek, steel-blue convertible with a long hood and a short, stubby rear deck. The XR-400's long 108-inch (2,743 mm) Ambassador wheelbase and truncated overhangs gave it athletic proportions. At the same time, the top-up appearance suggested a close-coupled two-seater sports car. Classic sports car touches included a hood line that sloped lower than the front fenders, doors that had a dip in their top, and simulated air extractors behind the front wheels.

Power for the XR-400 was supplied by a standard Ambassador two-barrel 250 hp (186 kW; 253 PS) 327 cu in (5.4 L) AMC V8 engine. The engine bay could accommodate any of AMC's I6 or V8 engines. The transmission was an automatic (not typical of sports cars for that time) controlled through a floor console-mounted shift lever. Braking was provided by an experimental front disc brake system.

The interior used AMC's front seats and many other hardware items. In classic sports car fashion, the driver had all controls and a complete set of instruments (speedometer, tachometer, as well as gauges for fuel, water temperature, amperes, and oil pressure) that mounted directly ahead of a three-spoke wood-rimmed Nardi (brand) steering wheel.

Budd's sales pitch to AMC included pioneering a market "presently untapped by any other manufacturer" with a car that "unlike anything else on the road, it would attract widespread attention, provide your dealers with both a new profit area and morale-builder, and offer unusual advertising and sales promotion opportunities."

== Expectations ==
The experimental convertible was publicly exhibited at the 1964 meeting of the Society of Automotive Engineers (SAE). The press release stated that the concept shows how modifying Rambler Ambassadors results in:

"... A brand new type of car—one designed specifically to take over a healthy segment of the new car market presently untapped by any American manufacturer...."

Automotive press reports stated that such a new model could have appeared in AMC dealer showrooms, thus establishing a market segment at least six months before Ford's similar Mustang started the "pony car" market. Unfortunately, AMC turned down the idea. There were several reasons for this decision, including:

- American Motors' President George W. Romney, who cemented the company as a maker of compact cars, left the company in February 1962 to run for governor of Michigan.
- The new model needed more interior space to compete successfully with other sporty compact cars already on the market, such as the Chevrolet Corvair Monza and the Pontiac Tempest Le Mans.
- American Motors was developing entirely new models for 1963, and this was a significant capital drain. Entering an entirely new market segment with an unproven car could be risky.
- The automaker was working on a new compact fastback concept car called the Rambler Tarpon, which used the soon-to-be-introduced third-generation Rambler American platform.

== Legacy ==
The Budd Company kept the only prototype model, but later renamed it "XR-Budd," and used it for marketing purposes. The Rambler lettering on the rear of the trunk lid was removed, while the stamped steel road wheels with full wheel covers were upgraded to chrome-plated reverse wheels with exposed lug nuts. Budd sold the prototype to The Henry Ford Museum in 1997. It is now at the museum and also displayed at major classic car shows.
