= Kirk, Oregon =

Unincorporated community in the state of Oregon, United States

- Unincorporated community
- Location within Oregon Location within the United States
- Coordinates: 42°44′57″N 121°49′45″W
- Country: United States
- State: Oregon
- County: Klamath
- Elevation: 4,528 ft (1,380 m)
- Time zone: UTC-8 (Pacific (PST))
  - Summer (DST): UTC-7 (PDT)
- ZIP code: 97624
- Area codes: 458 and 541
- GNIS feature ID: 1144638

Kirk is an unincorporated community in Klamath County, Oregon, United States. It was named for Methodist minister Jesse Kirk as well as a train station in the area. Its post office operated from 1920 to 1948.
