= Martinrea =

Canadian auto parts manufacturer

Coordinates: 43.777476°N 79.545744°W

Martinrea International Inc.
- Type: Public
- Traded as: TSX: MRE
- Industry: automotive parts
- Founder: Fred Jaekel; Nick Orlando; Rob Wildeboer
- Headquarters: Vaughan, Ontario, Canada
- Key people: Pat D'Eramo (President and CEO); Robert P. Wildeboer (Executive Chairman); Fred Di Tosto (Chief Financial Officer)
- Revenue: CAD$3.9 Billion (2017)
- Number of employees: 14,000+
- Website: www.martinrea.com

Martinrea International Inc. is an auto parts manufacturer based in Vaughan, Ontario. It operates in North America, Europe and Asia. Martinrea serves as a supplier for General Motors, Toyota, and Ford.

== History ==
Royal Laser Tech Corporation was formed under the Canada Business Corporations Act in 1998. A business with only a few employees, it provided and laser trimmed metal store fixtures and fabrications. Rob Wildeboer, Fred Jaekel, President of Cosma, and Nick Orlando, Vice President of Cosma finance joined Royal Laser Tech in August 2001 and focused new business on supply to original equipment manufacturers in the automotive industry.

=== Expansion by acquisition ===
- Rea International. In April of 2002, Royal Laser Tech Corporation purchased Rea International, a fluid system business, and automatically became a tier one supplier for General Motors.
  In June of 2002, Royal Laser Tech Corporation changed its name to Martinrea International Inc.
- Pilot Industries, fuel systems purchased 2002
- Corydon, Indiana, plant bought for Icon Metal Forming in February 2005.
- Depco International injection moulding and roll-formed metal products purchased 2006
- Thyssen-Krupp Budd: In November 2006, Martinrea International received the approval of US antitrust authorities to buy the North America body and chassis operations of Thyssen-Krupp Budd.
- SKD Automotive Group, 2009
- Honsel, manufacturer of aluminum engine blocks, transmission cases, suspension and other automotive parts, located in Meschede, Germany. 2011
- Metalsa, in March 2020, Martinrea International Inc. announced the acquisition of the Structural Components for Passenger Cars operations of Metalsa S.A. de C.V.
