= Budd Company =

American manufacturing company

The Budd Company
- Type: Private
- Industry: Rail transport, automobile, aviation
- Founded: 1912 (114 years ago)
- Defunct: 2014 (12 years ago)
- Fate: Bankruptcy
- Successor: Bombardier Transportation
- Headquarters: Philadelphia, Pennsylvania, United States
- Area served: Worldwide

- Edward G. Budd Manufacturing Company
- U.S. National Register of Historic Places
- U.S. Historic district
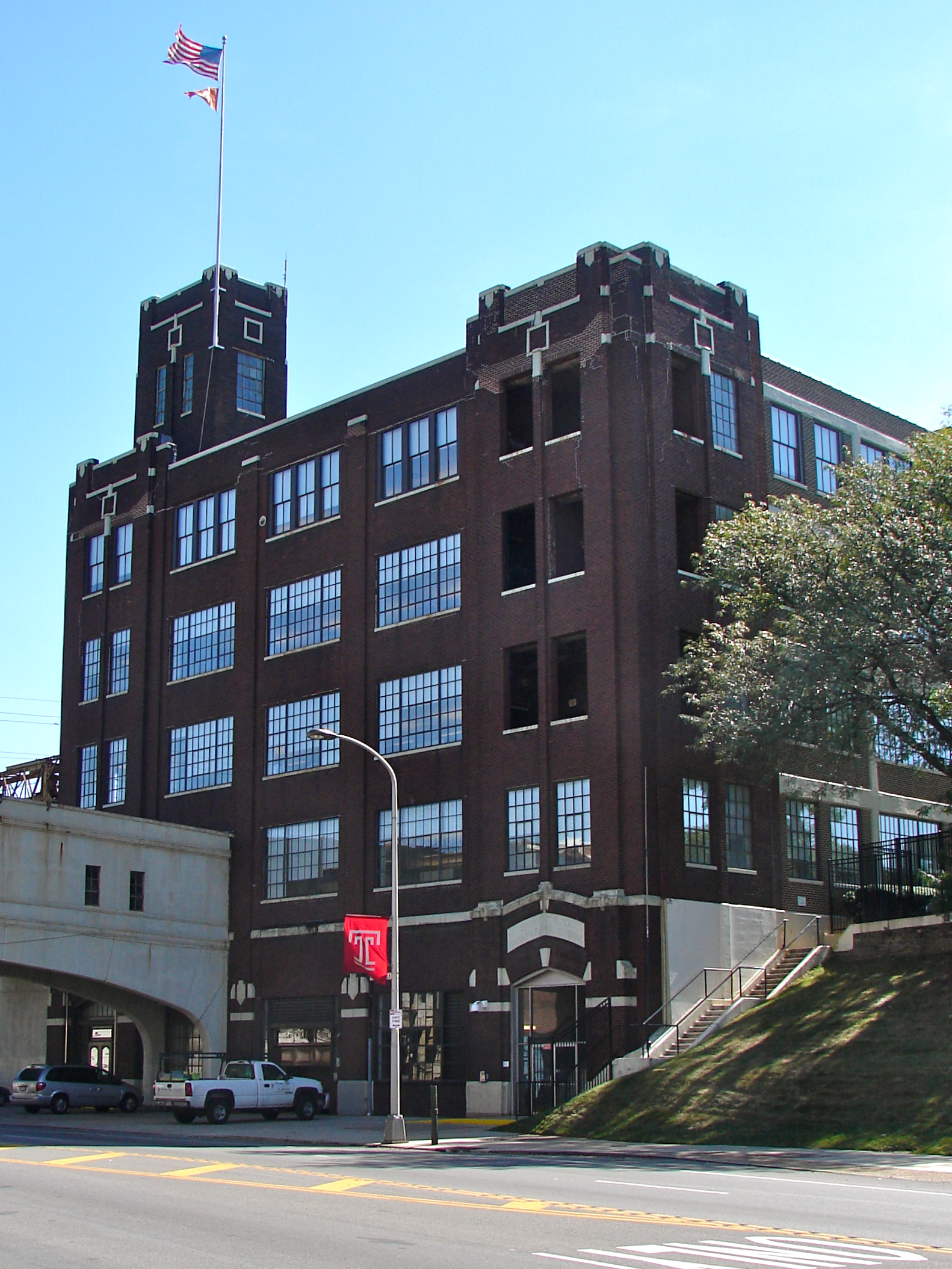
- The Budd manufacturing facility in Philadelphia

- Location within Philadelphia Location within Pennsylvania Location within the United States
- Location: 2450 W. Hunting Park Ave., Philadelphia, Pennsylvania, United States
- Coordinates: 40°00′29.6″N 75°10′08.7″W
- Area: 70 acres (28 ha)
- Built: 1917
- Architect: Giffels & Vallet, Inc.; Albert Kahn & Associates
- Architectural style: 20th Century Industrial
- NRHP reference No.: 07001328
- Added to NRHP: December 27, 2007

The Budd Company was a 20th-century metal fabricator, a major supplier of body components to the automobile industry, and a manufacturer of stainless steel passenger rail cars, airframes, missile and space vehicles, and various defense products.

The company was founded in 1912 in Philadelphia by Edward G. Budd, whose fame came from his development of the first all-steel automobile bodies in 1913, and his company's invention of the "shotweld" technique for joining pieces of stainless steel without damaging its anti-corrosion properties in the 1930s.

The Budd Company became part of Budd Thyssen in 1978, and in 1999 a part of ThyssenKrupp Budd. Body and chassis operations were sold to Martinrea International in 2006. No longer an operating company, Budd filed for bankruptcy in 2014. It currently exists to provide benefits to its retirees.

== Automobiles ==
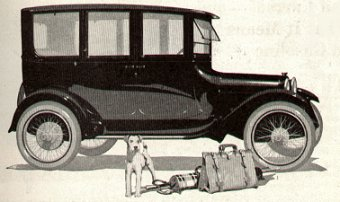
First all-steel sedan by Edward G Budd Manufacturing Company of Philadelphia for John and Horace Dodge

Edward G. Budd developed the first all-steel automobile bodies. His first major supporters were the Dodge brothers. Following discussions which began in 1913, the brothers purchased from Budd 70,000 all-steel open touring bodies in 1916. They were soon followed by an all-steel Dodge sedan.

Budd Company jointly founded, and from 1926 to 1936, held an interest in The Pressed Steel Company of Great Britain Limited (Cowley, England), which built bodies for Morris Motors and others, and Ambi-Budd (Germany), which supplied Adler, Audi, BMW, NAG and Wanderer; and earned royalties from Bliss (who built bodies for Citroën and Ford of Britain). The Budd Company also created the first "safety" two-piece truck wheel, used extensively in World War II, and also built truck cargo bodies for the US military.

Following the introduction of the "unibody" Citroën Traction Avant in 1934 using its technology, Budd developed North America's first mass-produced unibody automobile, the Nash 600. In the mid-1980s, Budd's Plastics Division introduced sheet moulding compound, a reinforced plastic in sheet form, suitable for stamping out body panels in much the same way, and as quickly as sheet metal equivalents are made. The Pontiac Fiero has some exterior SMC body parts manufactured by Budd Plastics – such as quarter panels, roof skin, headlamp covers, and trunk lids.

== Railroads ==
=== Passenger cars ===
From the 1930s until 1987, the Budd Company was a leading manufacturer of stainless steel streamlined passenger rolling stock for a number of railroads; many of these were known, at least colloquially, as "silverliners".

==== Early years ====
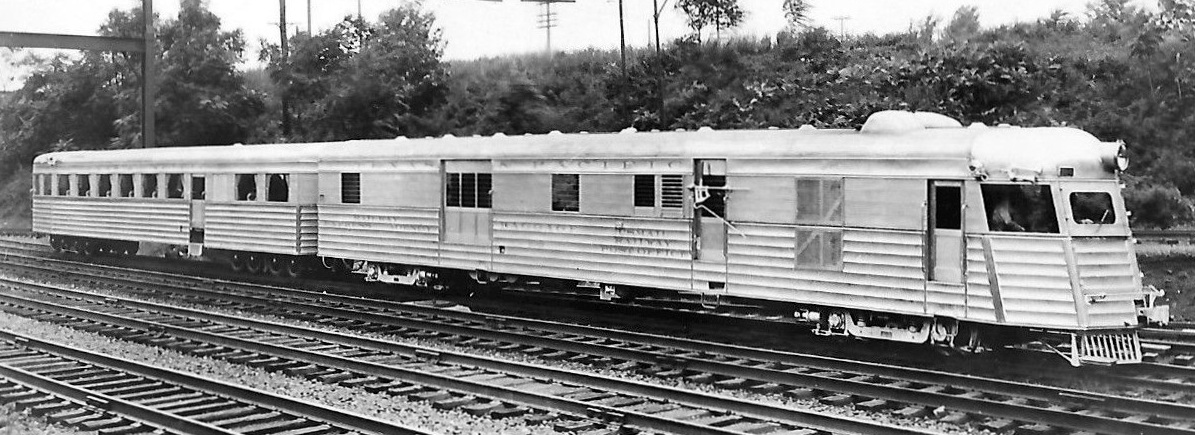
Silver Slipper

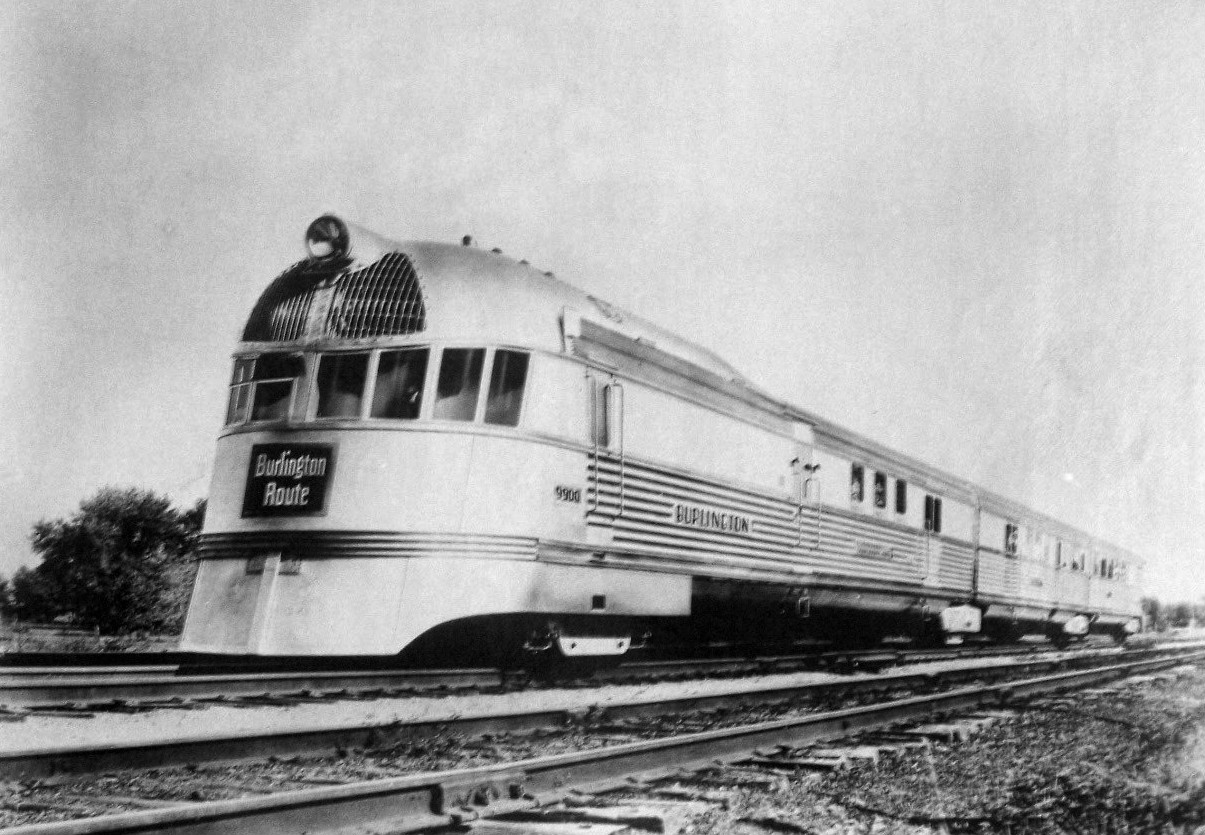
Pioneer Zephyr

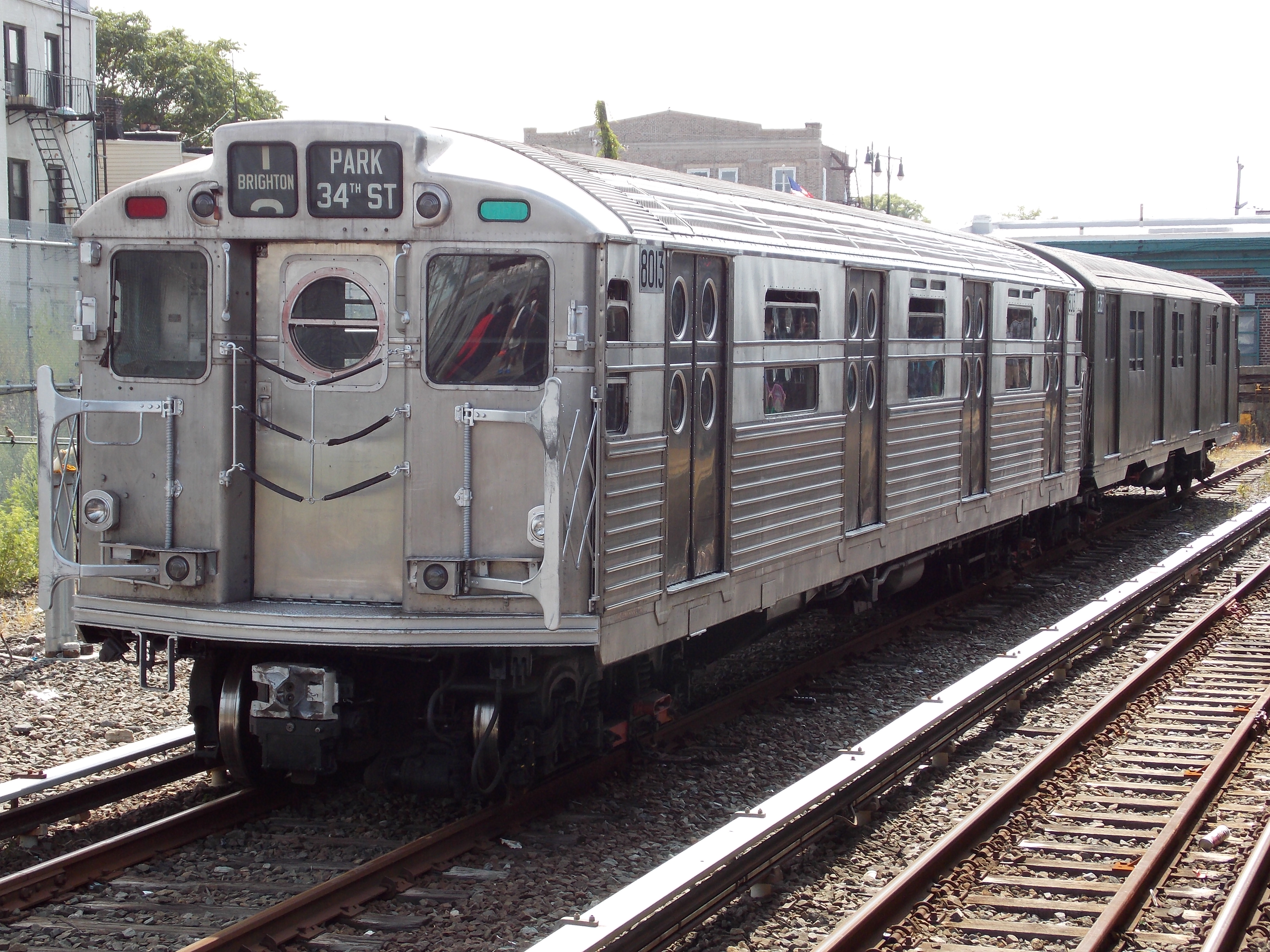
R11 subway car

After briefly dabbling with French Michelin rubber-tired technology ("Michelines" and the Silver Slipper), they built the Pioneer Zephyr for the Chicago, Burlington and Quincy Railroad in 1934, the first of several integrated streamliner trainsets. The General Pershing Zephyr of 1938 pioneered the use of disc brakes on railroad passenger cars. Budd built thousands of streamlined lightweight stainless steel passenger cars for new trains in the US in the 1930s through the 1980s.

In 1949, Budd built ten prototype stainless steel R11 subway cars for the New York City Board of Transportation; these were intended for the Second Avenue Subway.

In the late 1940s, the Chicago, Burlington and Quincy Railroad sought a way to increase capacity on commuter trains serving Chicago, Illinois, without having to add more cars. Chicago Union Station charged railroads by the length of each train. Budd proposed coaches that were taller than the typical lightweight passenger car while keeping the streamlined car's length of 85 feet but with double the capacity of cars. To address the issue of the conductor collecting tickets without having to climb stairs, the upper level was designed with its center portion open so that the conductor could reach the tickets from upper-level passengers. Rows of individual seats on each side of the car provided the increase in seating capacity.

The unique design of the upper level's open center section led to the cars being called Gallery Cars. Burlington approved the design and ordered 30 cars. These cars, built as Budd lot 9679–041, were delivered between August 1950 and January 1951 and not only marked a change in how the commuters were handled but were the first cars in commuter service to have air conditioning. The Burlington retrofitted its earlier cars with air conditioning once the new cars entered service.

With the first of the new commuter cars in service on the Burlington, the Atchison, Topeka and Santa Fe Railway also approached Budd to improve their rolling stock. In September 1952, the Santa Fe placed an order for two two-level prototypes, Budd's Lot 9679–129. Carrying the numbers 526 and 527, they were delivered in July 1954, at which time both were placed into service for evaluation.

These prototypes had seating on both levels, stairs on one end to provide access to single-level cars, a stairway at the center of the car for access to toilets on the lower level, and a side door for passenger access. The lower floor also contained various mechanical and pneumatic equipment that otherwise would be mounted below the floors of single-level cars.

With the two Hi-Level prototypes in service proving to not only meet the needs of line but also being popular with passengers, the Santa Fe again approached Budd with the idea of building additional two-level cars.

Budd developed another generation of cars for Santa Fe in five different configurations: step-down coaches like the two prototype cars, convertible coaches which could have one end of the car converted from the high level on both ends to a step-down car as needed, coaches with both ends of the car having the end door at the upper level's height to provide access to adjoining passenger cars, and dining and lounge cars (with kitchens on the lower level) with partially glassed-in roofs similar to the Big Dome lounge cars that were also built by Budd and delivered around the time the prototype Hi-Level cars were built.

The order for additional cars was placed in March 1955 for 10 68-seat step-down coaches (delivered between December 1955 and January 1956 and numbered 528 to 537), 25 72-seat Hi-Level coaches (delivered between January and April 1956 numbered 700 to 724), six 60-seat bar/lounge/news-stand coaches with 26-seat lower-level lounges (delivered between May and June 1956), and six 80-seat dining cars (delivered between June and August 1956 numbered 650 to 655).

With these cars delivered, the Santa Fe re-equipped the El Capitan, the only coach train operated between Chicago and Los Angeles, and assigned some to the Chicago–Galveston, Texas, Texas Chief line. An additional 12 step-down coaches, numbered 538 to 549, and 12 convertible coaches, numbered 725 to 736, were ordered in November 1962 and delivered between December 1963 and April 1964.

==== Later years ====
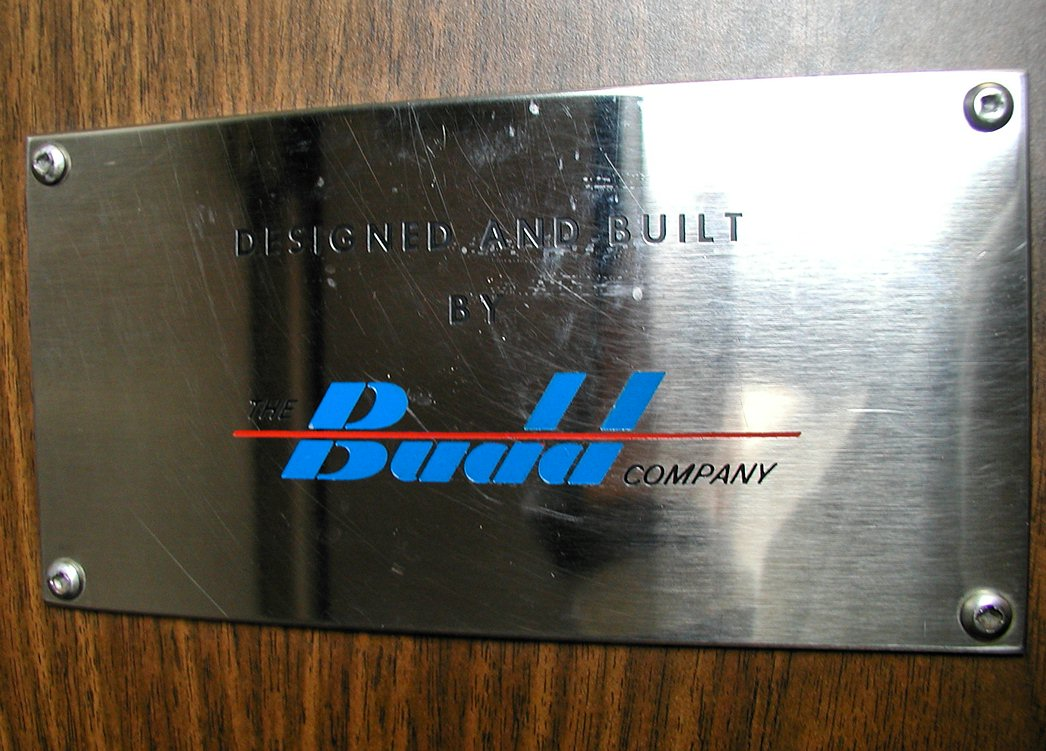
The Budd company logo on the builder's plate in a Metro-North Railroad M3 railcar.

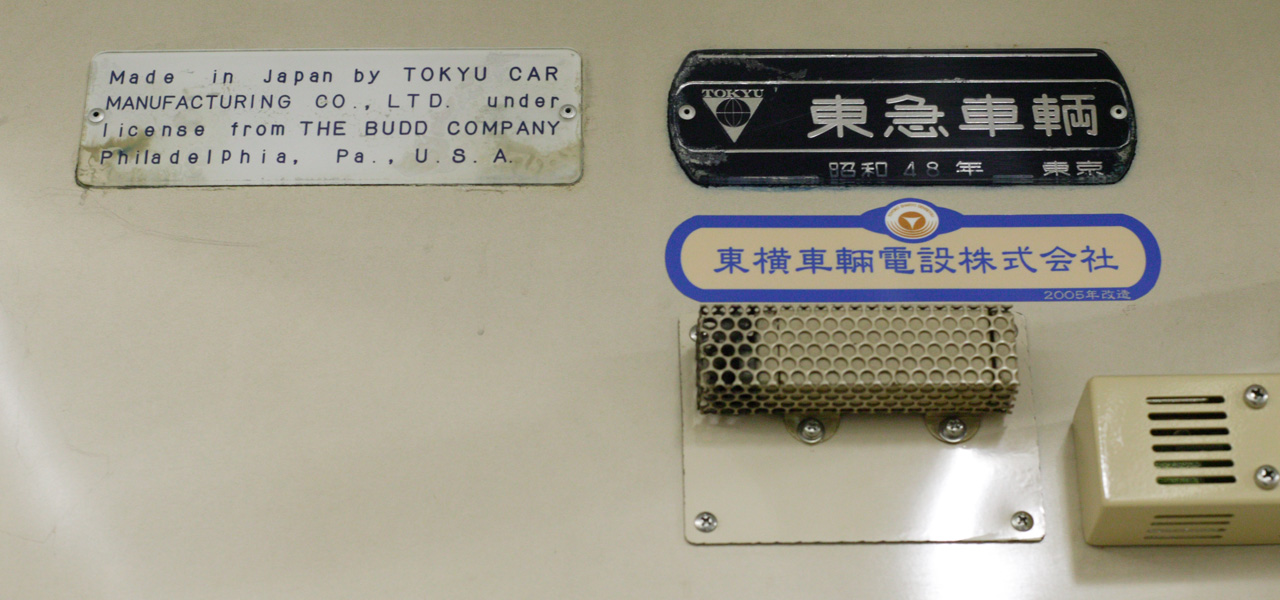
The Budd company license plate in a Tokyu Car Corporation railcar.

Budd continued to build gallery passenger cars for Chicago-area commuter service on the Burlington Route (and Burlington Northern after the merger), Rock Island, and Milwaukee Road lines during the 1960s and 1970s; most of these cars are still in service on today's Metra routes. The Santa Fe cars were the inspiration for the Amtrak Superliner and Superliner II which ply the rails on many different routes today, though they were not a product of Budd.

Stainless steel Budd cars originally built for the Canadian Pacific Railway's 1955 train The Canadian are still in service with Via Rail Canada. Since 1951, two formations of six Budd cars operated by Ferrobaires have run a weekly service called "El Marplatense" from Buenos Aires to the ocean-side city of Mar del Plata in Buenos Aires Province, Argentina; they were originally built for the Chesapeake and Ohio Railway.

Budd-patented processes and designs were also used in Brazil (by Mafersa), France, and Belgium after World War II to construct SNCF electric-powered multiple-unit cars, push-pull suburban trainsets, Wagons-Lits [CIWL] sleeping cars and even SNCF Class CC 40100, a small class of four-current six-axle high speed electric locomotives for Trans Europ Express service between Paris, Brussels, and Amsterdam and SNCB class 56 EMU.

In Japan, the Tokyu Car Corporation became the licensee of the Budd process and made stainless steel commuter cars like its Series 7000. Mafersa continued to manufacture cars based on Budd designs, building 38 for Virginia Railway Express between 1990 and 1992, some now at Shore Line East. Canadian Vickers and Avco built cars and incomplete kit shells (for GE) under Budd license, including the 1980 PATCO Series II cars, Metro-North M-2 Cosmopolitan, and the Arrow II/III/Silverliner IV MUs.

Budd also issued a licence to Australian manufacturer Commonwealth Engineering in Sydney in the late 1950s and 1989 for a variety of projects including the monocoque self steer V set double-decker interurban electric multiple units considered by many to be one of the world's most advanced double-decker designs. Budd's extensive research into the use of stainless steel carries on today in consulting businesses like Bay Rail.

=== Rail Diesel Car ===
In 1949, Budd introduced the Rail Diesel Car (RDC), a stainless steel self-propelled "train in one car" which expanded rail service on lightly populated railway lines and provided an adaptable car for suburban service. More than 300 RDCs were built, and some are still in service in Canada, the United States, Cuba, and Saudi Arabia. Similar but shorter cars were built under license by Mafersa in Brazil using the Budd Pioneer construction methods first used in 1956 on some of the later commuter cars, such as the Milwaukee Road gallery cars that operated out of Chicago and electric multiple unit (EMU) high-speed cars that operated between Washington, D.C., and New York City. The final few RDC cars were built by Canadian Car & Foundry under license from Budd.

=== Electric multiple units ===
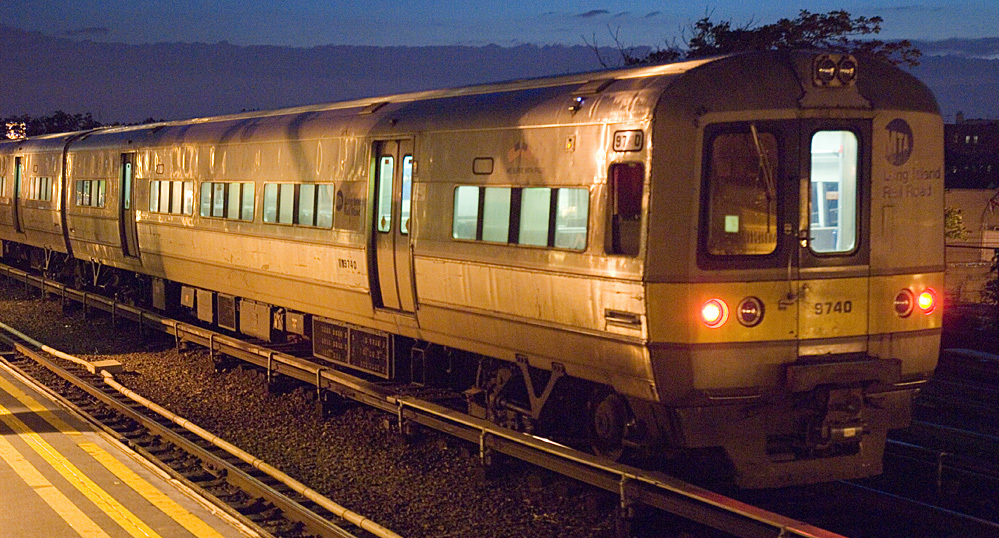
A Budd M1 train on the Long Island Rail Road.

In the late 1950s, Budd built the prototype Pioneer III. When re-designed and outfitted with electrical propulsion and end cabs as EMU coaches, six were purchased by the Pennsylvania Railroad for medium-distance use in its electrified territory. In 1963, they became known as Silverliner I cars when their use was supplemented by the Silverliner II, which used an improved Pioneer III body. They were placed into Philadelphia-area commuter rail service on the PRR and Reading Company lines.

Budd was contracted in 1966 by the PRR and the U.S. Department of Commerce's Office of High-Speed Ground Transportation (prior to the establishment of USDOT) to build the original Metroliner multiple unit cars for luxury high-speed service on the Northeast Corridor. The 50 original cars were delivered in 1967–69. An additional 11 coaches were built for SEPTA but were not put into service until 1972 by Amtrak. The Metroliners have been either retired, rebuilt into coaches without the cabs, or de-powered and used as cab cars.

The Silverliner II had a top speed of 90 mph (140 km/h) but ran at up to 100 mph (160 km/h) when the PRR used them on its Philadelphia-Harrisburg service. The Metroliner EMU cars operated at 110 to 125 mph (201 km/h), but every car was tested to at least 160 mph (260 km/h), although breakdowns in the system led Amtrak to derate them to 90 mph (140 km/h). Since their retirement from regular service, Amtrak has used them as cab-coaches.

=== Subway cars ===
In 1960, Budd manufactured the first stainless steel production subway cars for Philadelphia's Market–Frankford Line. 270 M-3 cars were jointly owned by the City of Philadelphia and the Philadelphia Transportation Company, (later known as SEPTA). Some rail enthusiasts nicknamed the cars "Almond Joys" because the four hump-shaped ventilators on the roof evoked the candy bar's shape.

There were 46 single units and 112 "married" pairs. The pairs were a "mixed marriage" because the odd-numbered car came with General Electric motors and equipment and was permanently coupled to the even-numbered car, which had Westinghouse motors and equipment. One car in this fleet was air conditioned.

These cars were replaced with more modern, air-conditioned M-4 units from 1997 to 1999. Some cars were transferred to the Norristown High Speed Line in the early 1990s. The cars had to be re-trucked, because the Norristown line is standard gauge (4' 8½") while the Market-Frankford line is Pennsylvania trolley gauge (5' 2½").

Industrial historian Jonathan Feldman has concluded that Budd, along with other "old-line" suppliers of subway cars, "lacked advanced systems-integration know-how and the skills required to manage complex electrical systems and electronics. Each of these firms had built railroad and subway cars, but modern subway cars became increasingly complicated. Like aircraft and automobiles, they became platforms for electronics."

== Transportation innovations ==
=== Aviation ===
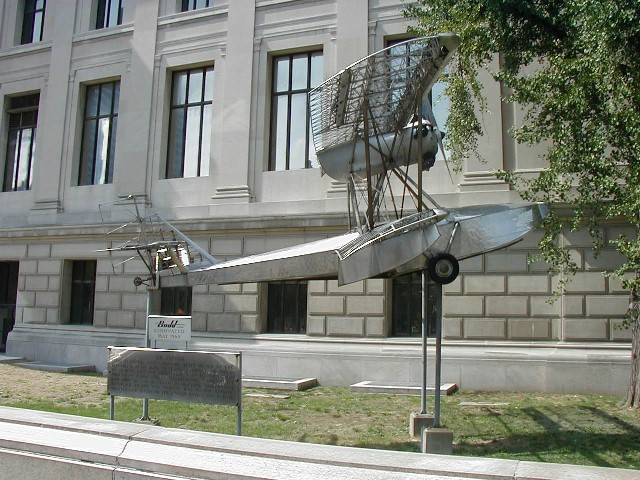
The Budd BB-1 Pioneer in front of the Franklin Institute

In 1930, the company made its first foray into the aviation industry by signing contracts to manufacture aircraft wheels and stainless steel wing ribs. Enea Bossi joined the company as the head of stainless steel research to supervise the design and construction of a four-seat biplane amphibian aircraft, the Budd BB-1 Pioneer. It was the first built with a stainless steel structure. This was the first aircraft for the Budd Company and made its first flight in 1931. Built under Restricted License NR749, its design utilized concepts developed for the Savoia-Marchetti S-56 and was powered by a single 210 horsepower (160 kW) Kinner C-5 five-cylinder radial engine.

The stainless steel construction process for the BB-1 was patented in 1942. At the time, stainless steel was not considered practical and only one was built. It logged about 1,000 flying hours while touring the United States and Europe. In 1934, this plane was stripped of its fabric covering and lower wing, and mounted outside the Franklin Institute in Philadelphia. The plane was memorialized in the children's book Spirited Philadelphia Adventure by Deirdre Cimino.

During World War II, Budd designed and built the RB-1 Conestoga transport airplane for the United States Navy using stainless steel in many places instead of aluminum. Only 25 were built but after the war, 14 found their way to the fledgling Flying Tiger Line.

=== Automobiles ===
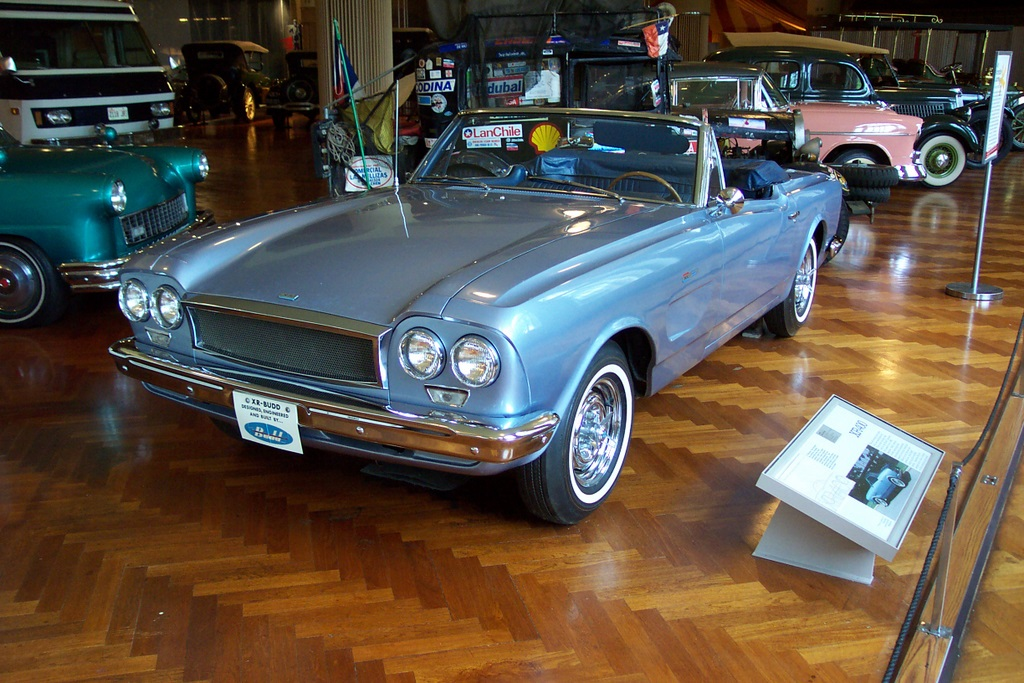
A Budd XR-400 at the Henry Ford Museum

In 1962, Budd produced an operational concept car, the XR-400, for the American Motors Corporation (AMC). It was designed to use AMC's existing chassis but ultimately did not enter production.

Ironically, Budd tried to sell a similar concept to Ford first. In 1961, Budd combined a 1957 Ford Thunderbird body with a 1961 Ford Falcon chassis to produce a sporty convertible. Ford chose to develop its entry into this segment, the Mustang, on its own Falcon chassis.

In 1965, Budd designed and manufactured a front disc brake system for some Chrysler, Imperial, and full-size Plymouth and Dodge automobiles from 1966 to 1968.

== Divisions and subsidiaries ==
By the end of the 1950s, Budd had the following divisions and subsidiaries:

- Budd Lewyt Electronics, Inc. — special-purpose data processing systems, communications equipment, instrumentation, and environmental control products for electronics.
- Tatnall Measuring Systems Division — physical testing equipment, metal film strain gages, standard and custom load cells, and a unique PhotoStress technique for direct strain measurements.
- Continental-Diamond Fibre Corporation — special high-heat resistant materials for ablation applications, laminated and molded plastics, vulcanized fiber, and bonded mica in the form of sheets, rods, tubes, and tape.
- Defense Division — advanced aerospace and atomic structures, coupling a broad research and engineering capability with extensive prototype and production facilities.
- Nuclear Systems Division — gamma radiography equipment for non-destructive testing of airframes, providing beam, panoramic, and internal exposures in shop and field.
- Electronic Controls Section — monautronic resistance welding controls for the aircraft industry.

== Final years of railcar production ==
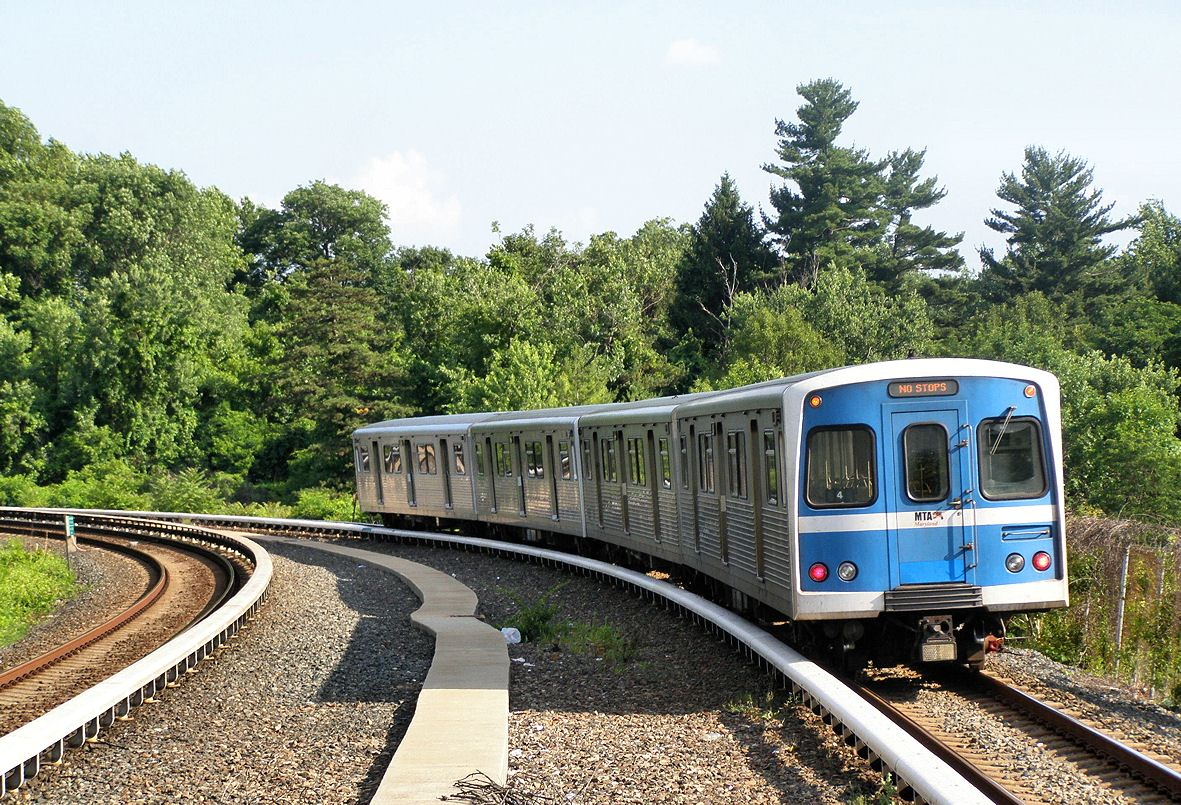
A Budd-built Baltimore Metro Subway train

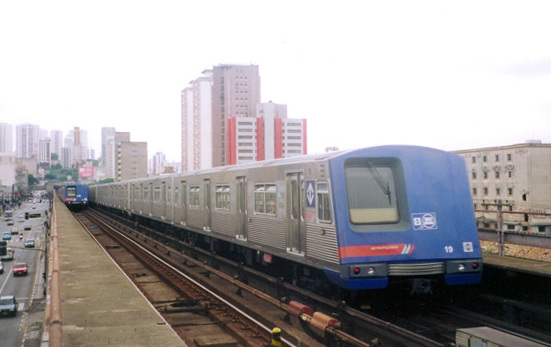
A Budd train built by Mafersa in São Paulo Metro

Budd built two series of "L" cars for the Chicago Transit Authority, the 2200 series (1969–1970). and the 2600 series (1981–1987). They also built the New York City Subway R32 (1964–1965), the first PATCO Speedline cars (1968–1969) and the Long Island Rail Road/Metro-North Railroad M-1/M-3 (1968–1973,1984–1986). The Baltimore Metro and Miami Metrorail cars (1983) were built by Budd and marketed as Universal Transit Vehicles; a similar set of cars (known as the Breda A650) were built by Breda for the Red and Purple lines of the Los Angeles Metro Rail between 1988 and 1997. Stainless steel railcars were also built in Portugal by Sorefame under license.

Amtrak's 492 Amfleet I and 150 Amfleet II cars were built by Budd in 1975–77 and 1981–83. The Metroliner-based Amfleet body was recycled for use in the SPV-2000, a modernized diesel passenger car which was intended as a successor to the RDC but proved to be very problematic. It had only four buyers: (Amtrak, ONCF, Metro-North and Connecticut Department of Transportation) and would mostly be prematurely retired within 15 years due to reliability issues. The fallout from the SPV-2000 furthered the company's decline.

In 1978, as Budd began to phase out its railcar business to concentrate on the automotive industry, it was acquired by Thyssen AG, becoming its automotive division in Europe (Thyssen Automotive) and North America (Budd Thyssen). The CTA 2600 series cars were finished in 1987 and were the last railcars to be built by Budd/Transit America.

In the mid-1980s, Budd reorganized its rail operations under the name Transit America. Nonetheless, on April 3, 1987, Budd ended all railcar production at its Red Lion plant in Philadelphia and sold its rail designs to Bombardier Transportation. Many of its engineers joined the staff of Louis T. Klauder and Associates, a local railway vehicles and systems engineering consulting firm.

=== Modern role in auto industry ===
When Thyssen merged with Krupp in 1999, Budd Thyssen became ThyssenKrupp Budd Co. in North America and ThyssenKrupp Automotive Systems GmbH in Europe. In 2006, ThyssenKrupp sold the majority of Budd's operations. Its body and chassis operations were sold to Martinrea International Inc. The plastics manufacturing and molding operations were sold to Continental Structural Plastics and the aluminum casing company Stahl was sold to Speyside Equity. Its last remaining operation was sold in 2012.

== Preservation ==
Numerous Budd railcars are preserved either by museums or private owners, many of which run them in charter service. Their quality of construction and elegant design have made them highly prized.

=== Pennsylvania ===
The Railroad Museum of Pennsylvania has a number of Budd-built cars in its collection in Strasburg: the 1937 observation car built for the Reading Company "Crusader", a Lehigh Valley Railroad rail diesel car of 1951, and Pennsylvania Railroad 860, a Metroliner snackbar-coach built in 1968.

The Bellefonte Historical Railroad Society has two RDCs in its collection: #5718, built in 1953 for the New Haven Railroad, and #7001, built in 1961 for the Reading Railroad.

The Reading Blue Mountain and Northern Railroad has three operating RDCs, with road numbers 9166, 9167 and 9168.

=== New York ===
A 1949 R11 (8013) and a 1964 R32 pair (3352-53) are in the New York Transit Museum fleet. Another R32 pair (3350-3351) is preserved by Railway Preservation Corp.

=== Indiana ===
The Indiana Transportation Museum maintains a fleet of fourteen closed-window Budd coaches built for the Atchison, Topeka, and Santa Fe. Eight units are currently restored and are used in excursion service, including the Indiana State Fair Train. ITMZ also operates the Silver Salon as a head-end power car.

=== Illinois ===
The Illinois Railway Museum is home to the Nebraska Zephyr articulated train along with several Budd-built passenger cars and a pair of CTA 2200 series cars. Chicago's Museum of Science and Industry has housed the Pioneer Zephyr since its retirement in 1960.

=== California ===
The Western Pacific Railroad Museum at Portola, California, features several Budd cars including the California Zephyr, the dome lounge car Silver Hostel, the diner car Silver Plate, and a Southern Pacific Budd sleeping car.

=== Missouri ===
The National Museum of Transportation in St. Louis now owns former Zephyr diner Silver Spoon as well as the Budd-designed locomotive Silver Charger from the General Pershing Zephyr.

=== Massachusetts ===
Bedford Depot, situated at the northwestern end of the Minuteman Bikeway (formerly the Lexington Branch of the Boston & Maine railroad), has a restored Rail Diesel Car (#6211). The Berkshire Scenic Railway Museum in Adams also has a handful of RDCs, most notably the former B&M 6126.

=== Wisconsin ===
The Mark Twain Zephyr trainset is preserved at the Wisconsin Great Northern Railroad, undergoing restoration to operating condition.

=== Portugal ===
The National Railway Museum at Entroncamento, Portugal, features a pair of Budd cars built in 1940.

=== Argentina ===
There are several Budd coaches, combines, and buffet-diner cars running in the Buenos Aires-Mar del Plata corridor. They are run as a luxury service during the summer months. The coaches and combines are in their original condition while the buffet-diner car had to be partially remodeled after a fire. They were originally purchased by the Chesapeake and Ohio Railroad but were sold before they could be used. Currently the train runs with one combine, three coaches, and a buffet-diner car, pulled by either an EMD GT22 or an English Electric locomotive.

== Wind power ==
In 1939, the Budd company designed and fabricated the stainless steel skin for the blades of the Smith–Putnam wind turbine, the largest in the world for forty years.

== Industrial facilities ==
Budd operated at multiple sites in the Philadelphia area. It had a brick factory in Nicetown. An automobile parts factory on Hunting Park Avenue closed in 2002. Rail car manufacturing was accomplished at the Red Lion Plant at Red Lion and Verree Roads in Philadelphia. The company moved its headquarters from Philadelphia to Troy, Michigan, in 1972. In 2002, the company operated 39 factories with approximately 12,000 employees in North America.

== See also ==
- Joseph Ledwinka
- Slumbercoach
