= Zephyr (train) =

List of trains with the same name

The Pioneer Zephyr is a diesel-powered stream-lined train-set built by the Budd Company in 1934 for the Chicago, Burlington & Quincy Railroad in the United States.

Since then, a zephyr has come to mean an American passenger rail route operated using stream-liner train-set of locomotives or power cars with matching passenger cars. Zephyr rail routes with proper names include:

== Amtrak ==
- Illinois Zephyr, Chicago, Illinois to Quincy, Illinois
- California Zephyr, Chicago, Illinois to Emeryville, California
- San Francisco Zephyr, Chicago, Illinois to San Francisco, California

== Burlington-Rock Island Railroad ==
- Rocky Mountain Rocket, Chicago, Illinois to Denver, Colorado
- Sam Houston Zephyr, Fort Worth to Houston, Texas
- Zephyr Rocket, St. Louis, Missouri to Minneapolis/St. Paul, Minnesota (jointly operated with Chicago, Burlington and Quincy Railroad)

== Chicago, Burlington and Quincy Railroad ==
- Ak-Sar-Ben Zephyr, Lincoln, Nebraska to Chicago, Illinois
- American Royal Zephyr, Chicago to Kansas City
- Denver Zephyr, Denver to Chicago
- General Pershing Zephyr, Kansas City to St. Louis
- Kansas City Zephyr, Kansas City to Chicago
- Nebraska Zephyr, Chicago, Illinois to Lincoln, Nebraska
- Ozark State Zephyr, Kansas City to St. Louis
- Silver Streak Zephyr, Lincoln, Nebraska to Kansas City, Missouri
- Twin Cities Zephyr, Chicago to Minneapolis
- Zephyr Rocket, St. Louis to Minneapolis; jointly operated with Rock Island Railroad

== Other trains ==
- Mark Twain Zephyr, St. Louis, Missouri to Burlington, Iowa; an early articulated trainset
- Minnesota Zephyr, a heritage railroad out of Stillwater, Minnesota
- Rio Grande Zephyr, Denver, Colorado to Ogden, Utah; operated by Denver and Rio Grande Western Railroad
- Texas Zephyr, Denver to Dallas
