= Silver Streak =

Silver Streak may refer to:

== Transportation ==
- "Silver Streak", a nickname for the Pioneer Zephyr
- Silver Streak Zephyr, a passenger train
- "Silver streak" trainspotter's nickname for LNER Class A4 for the original silver color scheme
- Silver Streak (bus), a bus rapid transit system
- AJS Silver Streak, a British motorcycle
- Short Silver Streak, a British aircraft
- SEMTA Commuter Rail, also known as "Silver Streak"

== Entertainment ==
- Silver Streak (character), a comic book character
- Silver Streak (dog)
- Silver Streak (film), a 1976 comedy, action and mystery film
- Silver Streak (ride), an amusement ride
- Silver Streak (Canada's Wonderland), a roller coaster at Canada's Wonderland, Vaughan, Ontario
- The Silver Streak, a 1934 film
- The Silver Streak, a 1945 Terrytoons Mighty Mouse short film

== Other uses ==
- Silver Streak Galaxy, a nickname for NGC 4216

== See also ==
- Silverstreak
- Blue Streak
- Red Streak
- Yellow streak
