= Silver Streak Zephyr =

Train service of the CB&Q railroad

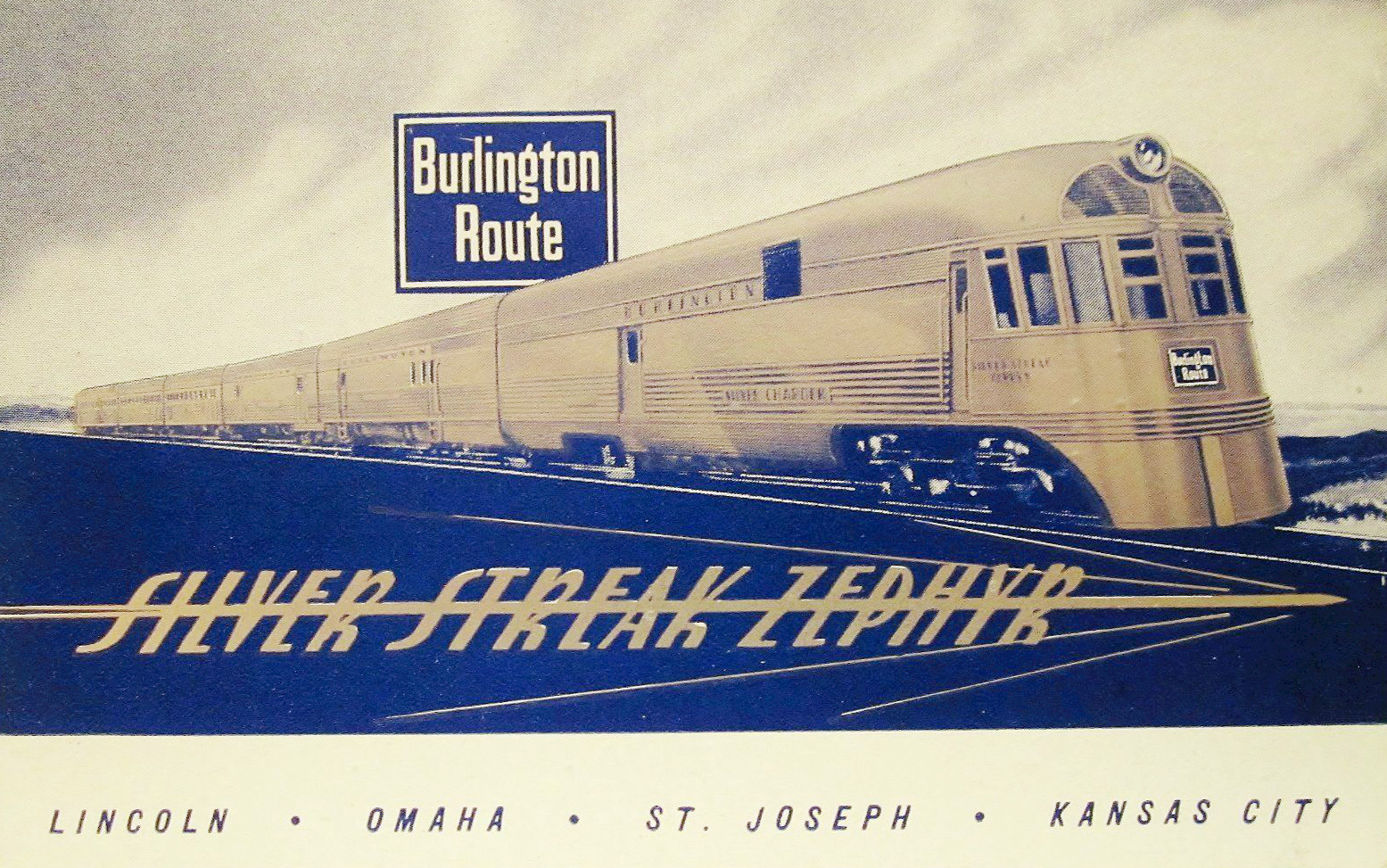
- Postcard depiction of the train.

Overview
- Service type: Daytime inter-city rail
- Status: Discontinued
- First service: April 15, 1940
- Last service: 1959
- Former operator: Chicago, Burlington and Quincy Railroad

Route
- Termini: Lincoln, Nebraska; Kansas City, Missouri
- Distance travelled: 250 miles (402 km)
- Average journey time: Eastbound: 5 hrs 50 min; Westbound: 5 hrs 35 min
- Service frequency: Daily
- Train numbers: Eastbound: 20, Westbound: 21

On-board services
- Classes: Coach and Parlor
- Seating arrangements: Two 52-seat coaches
- Catering facilities: 24 seat diner in Parlor-observation car
- Observation facilities: 22 seat Parlor-observation car

Technical
- Track gauge: 4 ft 8 1/2 in (1,435 mm)

The Silver Streak Zephyr was a train service of the Chicago, Burlington and Quincy Railroad in the American Midwest. It ran from 1940 through 1959.

On April 15, 1940 the Chicago, Burlington and Quincy Railroad inaugurated the Silver Streak Zephyr operating a Lincoln-Omaha-St. Joseph-Kansas City round trip daily. The new train was named Silver Streak Zephyr for the train portrayed in the Paramount Motion Picture The Silver Streak, with the starring role by the Pioneer Zephyr. The CB&Q liked the name and assigned it to the new Zephyr. This was the second Zephyr assigned to this route as the Pioneer Zephyr had operated in this service for some time and had actually outgrown it, when it generated more traffic than it was able to handle.

For power the new five car lightweight streamliner was assigned a new EMD E5A unit developing 2,000 horsepower (1,500 kW) Passengers were obviously pleased with the new Silver Streak Zephyr as ridership showed a marked increase within days of the new trains entry into service. As with the earlier General Pershing Zephyr and Ak-Sar-Ben Zephyr the new Silver Streak Zephyr no longer operated with articulated train sets or for that matter even articulated cars. The Burlington's days of ordering articulated equipment were over and no further cars of that type would ever be contemplated.

Silver Streak Zephyr Consist
9909	SILVER BULLET	EMD E5A 2,000 hp Diesel Passenger Cab Unit
900	SILVER LIGHT	Baggage car
1600	SILVER SHEEN	Baggage 30-foot Railway Post Office car
4703	SILVER GLEAM	52-Revenue seat Coach
4704	SILVER GLOW	52-Revenue seat Coach
300	SILVER SPIRIT	24-seat dining 22-Revenue seat parlor-observation
