= Ozark State Zephyr =

American trainset

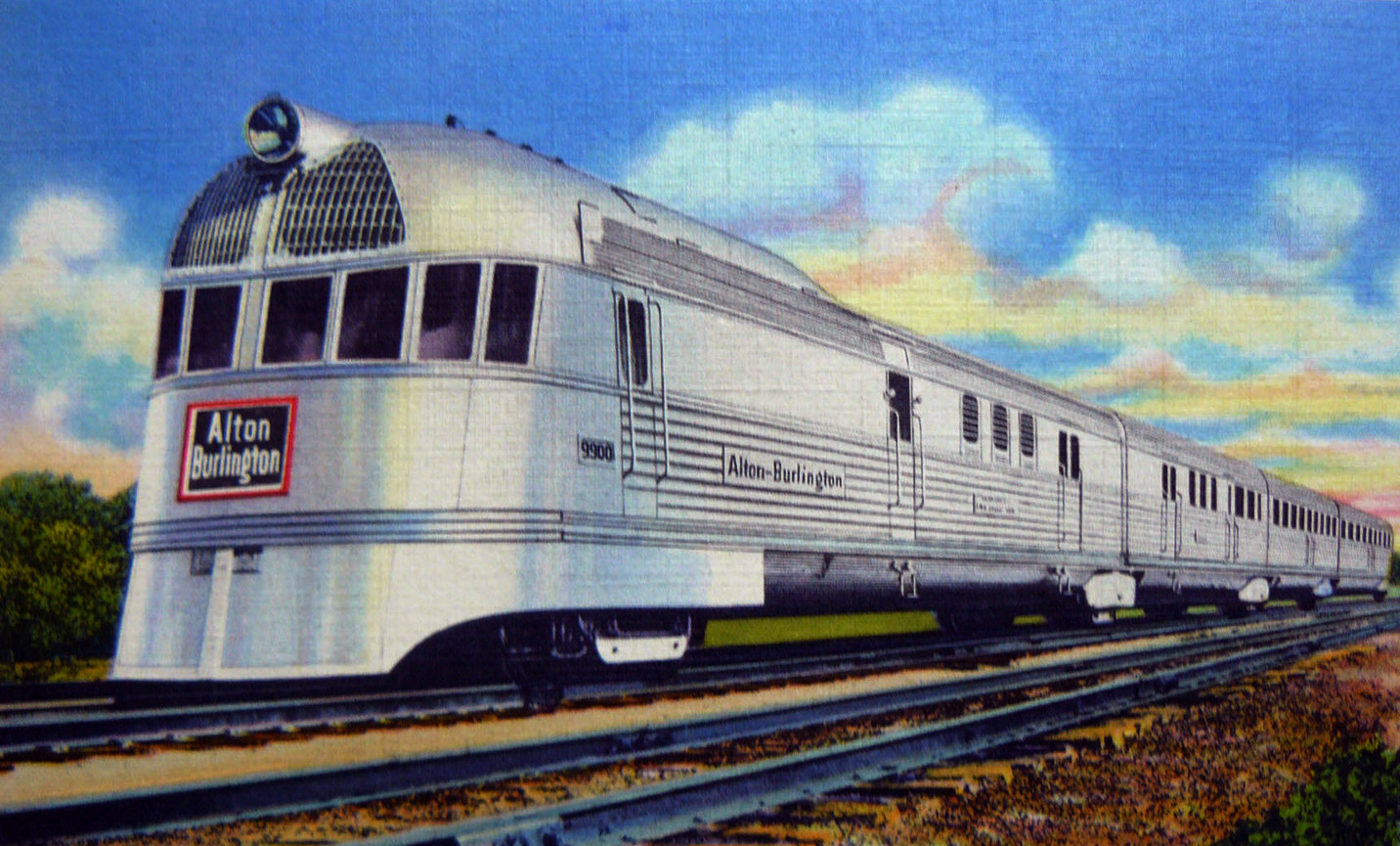
- Postcard of the Ozark State Zephyr; note the front signage indicating the joint Alton-CB&Q operation.

Overview
- First service: December 20, 1936
- Last service: April 30, 1939
- Successor: General Pershing Zephyr; Mark Twain Zephyr

The Ozark State Zephyr was a streamlined passenger train operated by the Chicago, Burlington and Quincy Railroad (CB&Q) and the Alton Railroad (the "Alton") between St. Louis and Kansas City in Missouri, home of the Ozarks. It operated from 1936 to 1939. The Zephyr was one of several short-haul Midwestern routes operated by the CB&Q's then-revolutionary articulated streamlined trainsets, including one of the original Twin Cities Zephyrs.

== History ==
The Ozark State Zephyr, along with the Sam Houston Zephyr, was made possible by the re-equipping of the Twin Cities Zephyrs in 1936, which freed up the original two equipment sets, #9901 and #9902. The train made a single round-trip per day, departing St. Louis for Kansas City in the morning and returning in the evening. It covered the 279 miles (449 km) in 5 1/2 hours. The new service was christened by Mollie Stark, daughter of Governor-elect Lloyd C. Stark, who rode the new train from St. Louis to Kansas City prior to it entering revenue service.

The CB&Q and Alton increased the service to twice-daily in September 1938 with the addition of equipment set #9903, the Mark Twain Zephyr, which was renamed to match existing service. Contemporary advertising referred to the "Morning" and "Afternoon" Ozark State Zephyrs, mirroring the practice already adopted by the CB&Q with the Twin Cities Zephyrs. The new train operated on a reverse schedule, departing Kansas City in the morning and returning in the evening.

The CB&Q and Alton retired the Ozark State Zephyr name on April 30, 1939, with the arrival of the brand-new General Pershing Zephyr trainset. This set assumed the morning Kansas City–St. Louis round-trip, while the Mark Twain Zephyr, its original name restored, handled the morning trip from St. Louis.

== Equipment ==
As originally built by the Budd Company and the Electro-Motive Company for the Twin Cities Zephyr in 1936 #9902 consisted of a power car with baggage section, a buffet-coach with seating for 40, and coach-observation car with seating for 24 in the coach section and 24 in the observation section. The Mark Twain Zephyr consisted of four cars: a power car with railway post office (RPO), a baggage car, a coach-dinette with seating for 20, and a coach-observation car with seating for 40 in the coach section and 16 in the observation section. Both sets were articulated, making it a difficult process to add and remove cars. The relative lack of seating in both consists, and the presence of the RPO in the Mark Twain Zephyr, reflected the CB&Q's belief that mail and express revenue was a better source of income on short-haul Midwestern services than passenger traffic.
