= Blue Streak =

Blue Streak or Bluestreak may refer to:

== Entertainment ==
- Blue Streak (album), a 1995 album by American blues guitarist Luther Allison
- Blue Streak (comics), a secret identity used by three separate Marvel Comics supervillains
- Bluestreak (comics), a superhero character in the Marvel Comics series A-Next
- Blue Streak (film), a 1999 comedy film starring Martin Lawrence
  - Blue Streak (soundtrack), the soundtrack album for the 1999 comedy film Blue Streak
- Blue Streak (Cedar Point), a roller coaster at Cedar Point in Sandusky, Ohio, United States
- Blue Streak (Conneaut Lake), a former roller coaster at Conneaut Lake Park in Conneaut Lake, Pennsylvania, United States
- Bluestreak (Transformers), several robot superhero characters in the Transformers robot superhero franchise.
- BlueStreak (video game), the codename for the upcoming video game LawBreakers by Boss Key Productions

== Transportation and military ==
- Blue Streak (missile), a British ballistic missile
- PSA Airlines (call sign)
- Blue Streak (bus), a former bus network in Seattle, Washington
- Bluestreak, an Indonesian subsidiary of the Goodyear Tire and Rubber Company
- Bluestreak, a New Zealand railcar nickname; See NZR RM class

== Other uses ==
- Bluestreak cleaner wrasse, a species of wrasse

== See also ==
- Blue Streak McCoy, a lost 1920 American Western film
- Blue Steel (disambiguation)
