= Blue Streak (film) =

1999 film by Les Mayfield

- Theatrical release poster
- Directed by: Les Mayfield
- Written by: Michael Berry; John Blumenthal; Stephen Carpenter
- Produced by: Neal H. Moritz; Toby Jaffe
- Starring: Martin Lawrence; Luke Wilson; Dave Chappelle; Peter Greene; Nicole Parker; William Forsythe
- Cinematography: David Eggby
- Edited by: Michael Tronick
- Music by: Edward Shearmur
- Production companies: Columbia Pictures; The IndieProd Company; Original Film; Jaffe Productions
- Distributed by: Sony Pictures Releasing
- Release date: September 17, 1999
- Running time: 93 minutes
- Country: United States
- Language: English
- Budget: $36 million
- Box office: $117.7 million

Blue Streak is a 1999 American buddy cop action comedy film directed by Les Mayfield. Inspired by the 1965 film The Big Job, the film stars Martin Lawrence, Luke Wilson, Dave Chappelle, Peter Greene, Nicole Ari Parker and William Forsythe. Lawrence plays Miles Logan, a jewel thief who tries to retrieve a diamond he left at a police station, whereupon he disguises himself as a detective named Malone and gets paired with real policeman Detective Carlson to investigate burglaries.

The film was shot on location in California. The prime shooting spot was Sony Pictures Studios in Culver City, California.

Blue Streak was released theatrically by Columbia Pictures on September 17, 1999, and opened as the number one movie in North America. Despite receiving mixed reviews from critics, it went on to gross nearly $120 million at the worldwide box office against a $36 million budget. The film's soundtrack album, featuring a number of popular urban/hip-hop artists, was certified gold.

== Plot ==
Jewel thief Miles Logan and his crew—best friend Eddie, getaway driver Tulley, and new recruit Deacon—steal a $17 million diamond during a heist in Los Angeles. During the escape, Deacon betrays the crew, killing Eddie and trying to take the diamond for himself. As the police arrive, Miles hides the diamond inside the air ducts of a building under construction before being arrested. Deacon escapes.

Two years later, Miles is released from prison and tries to reconnect with his girlfriend Janiece, who ends their relationship after learning the truth about his past. Determined to retrieve the diamond, Miles discovers the building where he hid it is now a LAPD station. To gain access, he disguises himself as a pizza deliveryman, steals an access card, and visits his forger uncle, Lou, who helps him create fake police credentials. Assuming the identity of Detective Malone, Miles is mistakenly assigned to the Robbery/Homicide division—located where the diamond is hidden.

While trying to access the ducts, Miles accidentally foils a prisoner escape, gaining praise and a new partner, Detective Carlson. Forced to maintain his cover, Miles begins working cases while continuing his secret search for the diamond. His street smarts and criminal insight help him solve crimes, earning respect from his colleagues and later a promotion.

On their first case, Miles quickly uncovers a staged burglary. On the way back, he and Carlson stumble upon an armed robbery—committed by Tulley. Miles arrests him before he is shot but is then blackmailed: Tulley demands $50,000 to keep quiet about Miles's true identity. Miles attempts to recover the diamond but is interrupted when Carlson grows suspicious. Thinking fast, Miles claims to be working undercover for Internal Affairs. Carlson agrees to keep his secret.

Soon after, the team intercepts a heroin shipment and stores it in the evidence room. Miles locates the diamond but accidentally drops it into a bag of seized heroin. When the FBI requests the heroin for testing, Miles suggests using it in a sting operation. He volunteers to deliver the heroin as bait and secretly frees Tulley to help. However, Deacon also shows up at the drug deal and exposes Miles as a cop. As tensions rise, the LAPD and FBI raid the operation. Deacon escapes with the diamond in an armored truck and heads for the Mexican border.

U.S. agents are forced to halt pursuit at the border, but Miles steals a patrol car and follows Deacon into Mexico. He causes Deacon to crash and offers him a deal: hand over the diamond in exchange for a share. Once Miles has the diamond, he double-crosses Deacon, handcuffing him for the Federales. When Deacon tries to shoot him, Miles kills him, avenging Eddie's death. Miles returns to the border, where the LAPD and FBI demand answers. He claims to be an undercover Mexican officer reporting back to his superiors. Just before crossing, Carlson and Hardcastle stop him. Aware of his true identity but grateful for his help, they let Miles go, and he crosses into Mexico with the diamond, leaving his former life behind.

== Cast ==
- Martin Lawrence as Miles Logan/Detective Malone
- Luke Wilson as Detective Carlson
- Dave Chappelle as Tulley
- Peter Greene as Deacon
- Nicole Ari Parker as Melissa Green
- Graham Beckel as Lieutenant Rizzo
- Robert Miranda as Detective Glenfiddish
- Olek Krupa as Jean LaFleur
- Saverio Guerra as Benny
- Richard C. Sarafian as Uncle Lou
- Tamala Jones as Janiece
- Julio Oscar Mechoso as Detective Diaz
- Steve Rankin as FBI Agent Gray
- Carmen Argenziano as Captain Penelli
- John Hawkes as Eddie
- William Forsythe as Detective Hardcastle
- Octavia Spencer as Shawna
- J. Kenneth Campbell as FBI Section Commander Peterson
- Frank Medrano as Frank

== Reception ==
=== Box office ===
The film opened at #1 with a weekend gross of $19,208,806 from 2,735 theaters for a per venue average of $7,023. It ended its run with $68,518,533 in North America, and $49,239,967 internationally for a total of $117,758,500 worldwide.

=== Critical reception ===
Blue Streak had received mostly mixed reviews. Rotten Tomatoes gives the film a 35% "Rotten" rating based on reviews from 68 critics and an average rating of 4.80/10. The critical consensus reads: "Martin Lawrence lends his comedic touch, but the movie isn't much more than standard action-comedy fare." On Metacritic, the film has a score of 46 out of 100 based on 26 reviews, indicating "mixed or average" reviews. Audiences polled by CinemaScore gave the film an average grade of "A" on an A+ to F scale.

Gene Seymour of the Los Angeles Times described the film by saying that "it starts out like a caper flick that shifts, almost by accident, into an episode from the old Martin TV series [until] eventually, it settles for being a bleached, cluttered photostat of Beverly Hills Cop, if only a bit more clever than the original." Lawrence Van Gelder of The New York Times also compared the film to Beverly Hills Cop, and stated that "in this instance, the buoyancy is only intermittent."

Roger Ebert praised the film, giving it 3 stars out of 4 and writing: "Martin Lawrence is a comic actor with real talent, not always shown to best advantage. Bad Boys (1995), his cop buddy movie with Will Smith, was not a career high point, and it took a certain nerve to make another one. But Blue Streak works."

== Sequel ==
There were plans for a sequel to Blue Streak in the early 2000s, but it did not materialize. In 2000, reports indicated that Blue Streak 2 would reunite Martin Lawrence and Luke Wilson in a buddy cop format similar to 48 Hrs. Around the same time, Lawrence signed a two-picture, $20 million-per-film deal with Columbia Pictures, which included plans for a sequel. In early 2001, it was reported that screenwriter Steve Carpenter had submitted a script for the sequel. However, the project stalled and was later cited among a number of comedy sequels that were planned but never produced.

A legacy sequel was officially announced on October 25, 2024, with Martin Lawrence set to reprise his role and Sony Pictures attached to produce.

== Remakes ==
The 2002 Hindi film Chor Machaaye Shor starring Bobby Deol was an unauthorized remake of Blue Streak. The storyline of the 2008 Indian Telugu language film Blade Babji, starring Allari Naresh and Sayali Bhagat was inspired by this film which was then remade in Tamil as Kasethan Kadavulada (2011) and in Kannada as Kiladi Kitty (2012). The film was also remade in Persian as Loneh Zanbor (2017).

== See also ==
- The Big Job, a 1965 film with a similar plot
- Blue Streak
