= Blue Steel =

Blue Steel or blue steel may refer to:

== Science, technology and engineering ==
- Blue steel, a tempering color of steel
- Bluing (steel), a process in which steel is partially protected against rust
- Martensite, a crystalline form of steel
- Iron(II,III) oxide, a black oxide that may form when iron is heated
- Blue Steel (missile), a British Cold War nuclear missile

== Film ==
- Blue Steel (1934 film), 1934 western starring John Wayne
- R.O.T.O.R., a 1987 science fiction/action film also known as Blue Steel
- Blue Steel (1990 film), American action thriller film directed by Kathryn Bigelow
- Blue Steel Pose, Derek Zoolander's trademark look in Zoolander and Zoolander 2

== Other uses ==
- Blue Steel, canceled DC video games by Factor 5
- Blue Steel guitar strings, made by Dean Markley Strings
- Tar Heel Blue Steel, a basketball team

== See also ==
- Steel blue, a shade of blue that resembles blue steel
- Blue Stahli, a Detroit, Michigan-based electronic rock project (Stahl is a Germanic root word for steel)
- Arpeggio of Blue Steel, a 2014 manga and anime series
- Marking blue, a dye used in metalworking to aid in marking out rough parts for further machining
- Engineer's blue, for the purposes of layout or flattening, respectively, which is also referred to as bluing
