= General Pershing Zephyr =

American trainset

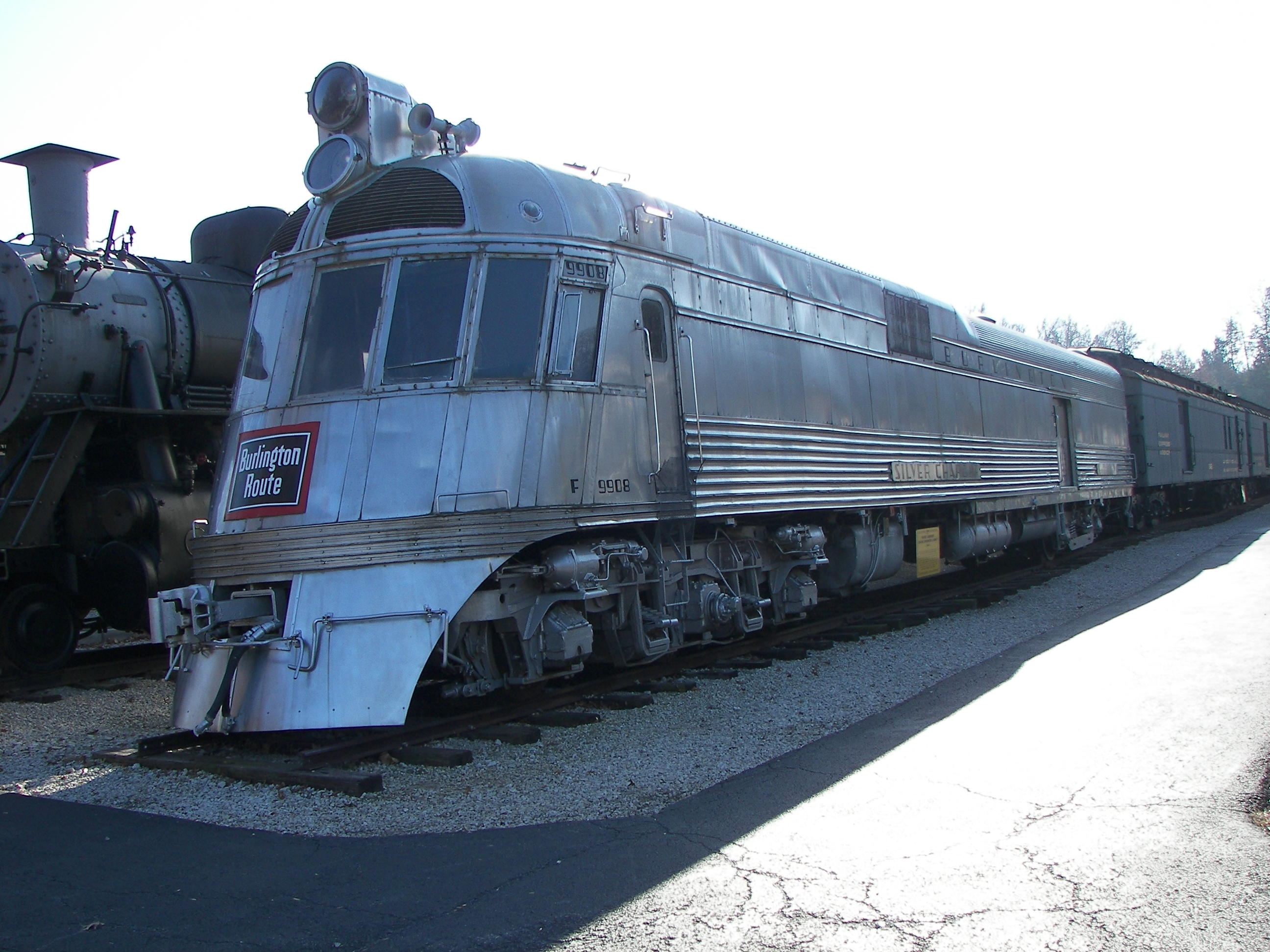
9908 Silver Charger on display in 2008

The General Pershing Zephyr was the ninth of the Chicago, Burlington & Quincy Railroad's Zephyr streamliners, and the last built as an integrated streamliner rather than a train hauled by an EMD E-unit diesel locomotive. It was constructed in 1939 with bodywork and passenger cars by Budd Company and diesel engine, electric transmission, power truck, and other locomotive equipment by General Motors Electro-Motive Corporation. Because its intended Kansas City to St Louis route passed near the birthplace and boyhood home of famous World War I General John J. Pershing, the train was named after him. The power car was named Silver Charger, after Pershing's horse Charger, while the passenger cars were named after United States Army badges of rank—Silver Leaf, Silver Eagle, and Silver Star.

The train replaced the Ozark State Zephyr, which had been inaugurated three years earlier. In September, 1938, a second set was added, the 9903, which had previously served as the Mark Twain Zephyr running between Burlington, Iowa and St Louis via Samuel Clemens' birthplace of Hannibal, Missouri. The Ozark State service inaugurated operating out of Kansas City in the morning and St Louis in the afternoon, with the second trainset alternating. The new equipment took over the original schedule, while the alternate timing was renamed the Mark Twain Zephyr (despite not operating through Hannibal).

Unlike previous Zephyrs, the General Pershing Zephyr was completely non-articulated; each car was self-contained and joined to the next by couplers, rather than shared trucks. The inflexibility of the articulated layout had been recognized; it was hard to lengthen, shorten, or replace parts of the train. The route did not require a high-capacity train nor a powerful locomotive, so the General Pershing Zephyr returned to the pattern of the first Pioneer Zephyr, being a power/baggage car and three trailers. Budd also fitted disc brakes, the first such practical installation to railroad passenger cars.

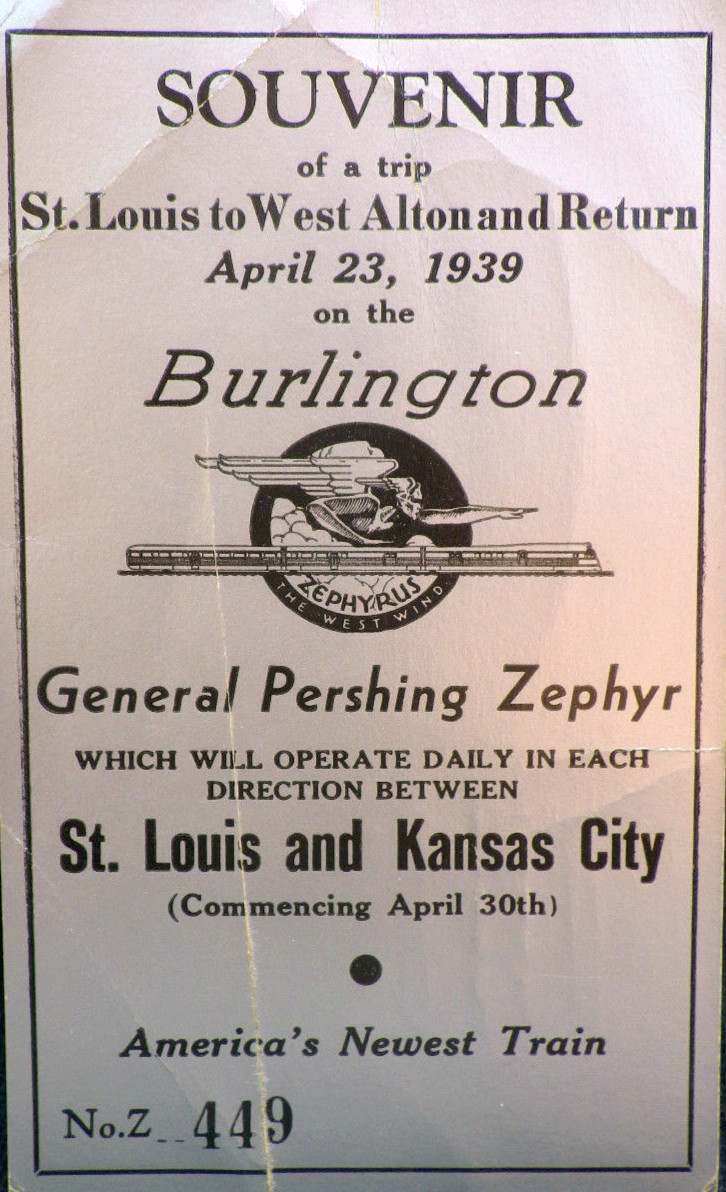
Ticket from the train's trial run between St Louis and Alton, Illinois on April 23, 1939. It entered regular service between Kansas City and St Louis on April 30, 1939.

The power car, 9908 Silver Charger, was unique. It utilized a single new EMC 567 V-12 engine developing 1,000 hp, rather than the pair used in the contemporary EMC E3. It had one Martin Blomberg-designed E-unit A1A passenger truck at the front, with powered outer axles and a center idler axle, and an unpowered trailing truck, giving it the unusual wheel arrangement of A1A-2. This made it mechanically half of an E3. The back half of the power car was a baggage area. This made it similar to special power-baggage units built by EMD for the Colorado Springs section of the Chicago, Rock Island & Pacific Railroad Rocky Mountain Rocket, though the latter had a carbody and E-3/E-6 styling by EMD. The "Silver Charger" was the last power unit built by Budd with the unique "Zephyr"/"Flying Yankee" shovelnose styling. It also carried sleeping cars. The train was number 32 when eastbound and number 33 when traveling west.

The train ran its assigned route until the United States entered World War II, during which time the trainset ran on many different routes. As 9908 Silver Charger could be detached from its trainset, it continued in service hauling other trains after the rest of the streamlined trainset was withdrawn. In this form it lasted in service until 1966, following which it was donated to the National Museum of Transportation in St Louis.

Traveling between Kansas City and St Louis required the General Pershing Zephyr to operate on tracks owned by the Alton Railroad, officially making them an operating partner. To symbolize this joint administration, the General Pershing Zephyr often sported an "Alton Burlington" nose herald instead of the standard "Burlington Route" seen on most Burlington locomotives.

The diner-lounge-observation car Silver Star was sold to Amax Iron Ore Corporation in 1974 for use on the Mount Newman railway in Western Australia and renamed Sundowner. It was used for many years as passenger accommodation on the fortnightly supply train to the mines. It was also used for VIP and inspection trains. Having last been used in 2003, it was sent to Perth for rebuilding as the nucleus of the Silver Star Cafe in Port Hedland.
