= The Silver Streak =

1934 film by Tommy Atkins

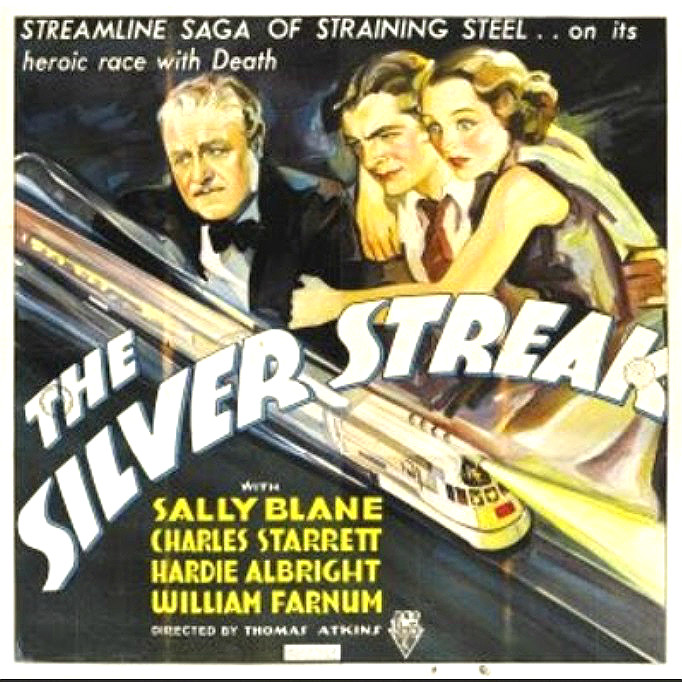
- Theatrical release half-sheet poster
- Directed by: Tommy Atkins
- Written by: H.W. Hanemann; Jack O'Donnell; Roger Whately
- Produced by: Glendon Alvine
- Starring: Charles Starrett; Sally Blane; Hardie Albright; William Farnum; Irving Pichel; Arthur Lake
- Cinematography: J. Roy Hunt
- Edited by: Frederic Knudtson
- Music by: Al Colombo
- Distributed by: RKO Radio Pictures
- Release dates: December 10, 1934 (Premiere-Galesburg, Illinois); December 21, 1934 (US)
- Running time: 72 minutes
- Country: United States
- Language: English

The Silver Streak is a 1934 American black-and-white film drama from RKO, loosely based on the record-setting "dawn-to-dusk" run of the Pioneer Zephyr on May 26, 1934. The film stars Sally Blane, Charles Starrett, William Farnum, and Hardie Albright.

The original Zephyr train was used for the film's exterior shots, while interior scenes were filmed on a Hollywood sound stage. For the film, the "Burlington Route" nameplate on the train's nose was replaced with one that read "Silver Streak". One of the film's promotional items was a small book called The Story of the Silver Streak, illustrated with black-and-white film stills.

In 2006 Con-Cor International, Ltd. produced scale models of the Pioneer Zephyr. A limited number (350 HO scale and 250 N scale) of these bore the film's Silver Streak nameplate instead of the standard Burlington Route nameplate.

== Plot ==
In the face of seriously declining railroad passenger travel, engineer Tom Caldwell presents to the president of the CB&D Railroad, B.J. Dexter, a design for a revolutionary streamlined diesel-electric train that will increase efficiency and lower all costs. Dexter opposes change, however, and the railroad's conservative board of directors agrees with him, rejecting Tom's concept. He quits in frustration. Sure that Tom's theory is sound, Dexter's daughter, Ruth, convinces Ed Tyler, a locomotive manufacturer, to look at Tom's design. Tyler is impressed and initiates immediate construction of the new train. Soon, Tom and his team prepare the newly named Silver Streak for a well-publicized trial run with Dexter and Ruth aboard as passengers.

The new train fails to attain even half of its projected speed of 100 miles per hour (160 km/h), however, and is easily overtaken by a steam-powered freight train hauled by CB&Q Class O-1-a No. 4990, a Class O-1-a 2-8-2 'Mikado' type steam engine. An angry Dexter tells Tyler that all the Silver Streak is good for is an exhibit at the Century of Progress Exposition to help recover his advertising expenses. Tom is baffled by the train's failure since all the engine components worked perfectly during assembly, but Dexter stubbornly insists that the concept will never work. Furious with Dexter's attitude, Tom quarrels with Ruth. Her brother Allen, who supported Tom's idea, tells his father that he is now quitting the railroad to take a job as a civil engineer with the Six Companies, Inc. constructing the Boulder Dam.

Tom and Bronte, the diesel engine's builder, discover that the electrical generator acquired for the Silver Streak has a manufacturing defect. After correcting it, the engine produces even greater power than he had earlier predicted. He tries to telephone Ruth with the good news to reconcile with her, but she has left Chicago to travel by train to California. Ruth discovers en route that infantile paralysis (polio) has broken out among the dam's construction crew and detours to the site only to find that Allen has contracted the disease. When a doctor informs her that Allen will die within 24 hours unless he receives treatment with an iron lung respirator, Ruth telephones her father to have one shipped to the dam by air. Dexter is told that a single iron lung is too heavy for any air transport to carry and cannot be disassembled. Tom and Tyler persuade Dexter to take a gamble on the Silver Streak, as it is now Allen's only hope.

With less than twenty hours to travel 2,000 miles (3,200 km), the Silver Streak is given emergency track clearance all the way after picking up a shipment of seven Drinker Respirators in Chicago. Tom includes Bronte on his crew, unaware that he is now wanted for attempted murder. As radio broadcasts track the progress of the "epic errand of mercy", the Silver Streak breaks records as it races south, against time, through the night. Nearing Boulder City, however, Bronte is revealed to be a wanted fugitive and throws the engine breakers to stop the train so he can escape. Instead, this causes the Silver Streak to run out-of-control at very high speeds. After a struggle, Tom knocks Bronte unconscious and finally regains control of the runaway train just before it arrives (early) at the Boulder City station. After the iron lungs are unloaded on the train platform, Ruth and Tom see each other and reconcile, sealing their relationship with a kiss.

== Cast ==
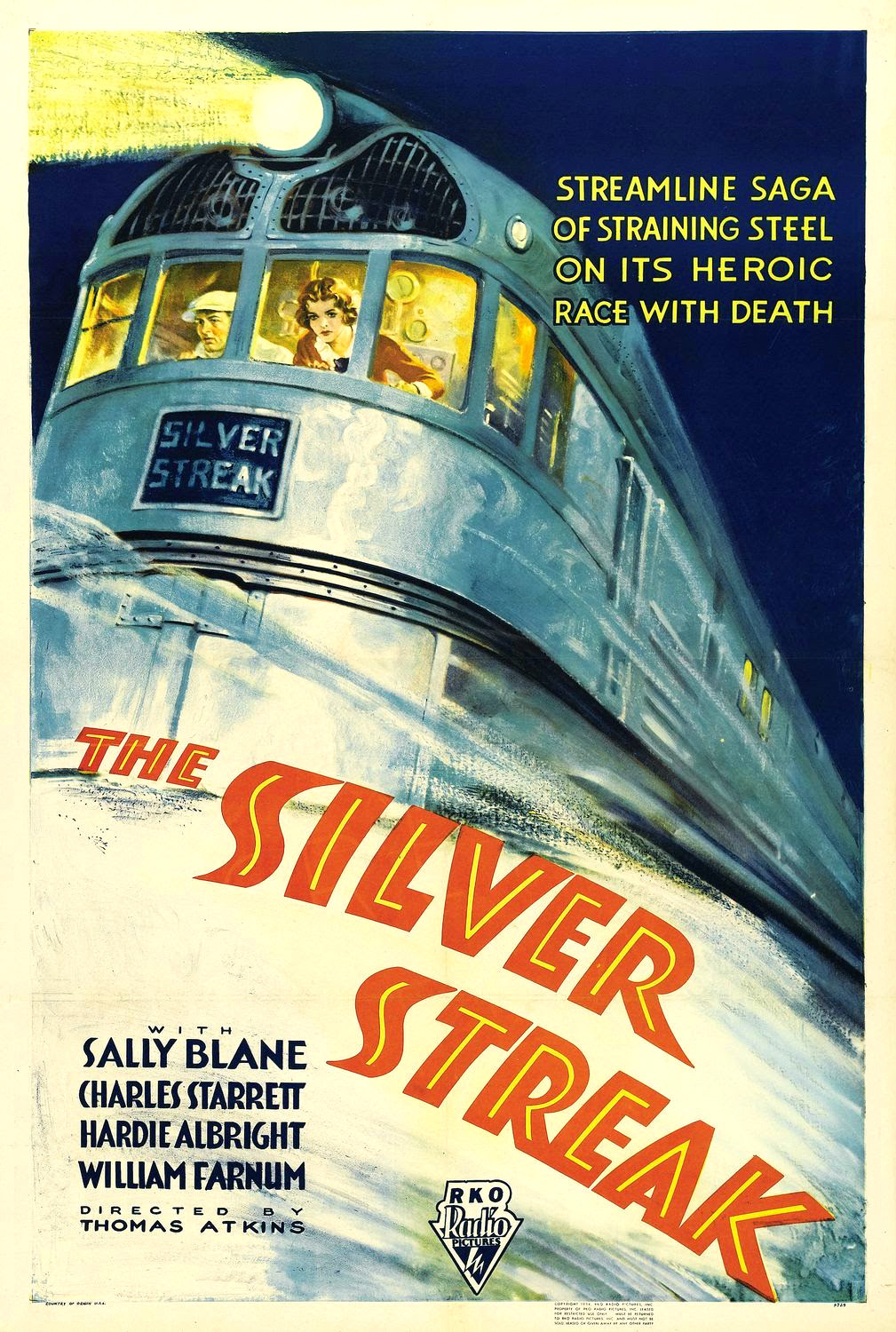
Film poster for The Silver Streak

- Sally Blane as Ruth Dexter
- Charles Starrett as Tom Caldwell
- William Farnum as B.J. Dexter
- Hardie Albright as Allen Dexter
- Irving Pichel as Bronte
- Arthur Lake as Crawford
- Theodore von Eltz as Ed Tyler
- Guinn "Big Boy" Williams as Higgins
- Edgar Kennedy as O'Brien
- Doris Dawson as Molly

== Production ==
The Pioneer Zephyr was chosen for the film after the California-based Union Pacific Railroad declined to provide its high-speed passenger train, the M-10000. The plot element of the infantile paralysis epidemic took advantage of public fears of the disease rampant in 1934 when more than 1,000 cases were diagnosed in Los Angeles alone. Location filming of the Zephyr was done over a two-day period in September 1934 at the CB&Q yards in Galesburg, Illinois. The train was renamed The Silver Streak for the film, which had been a discarded choice of CB&Q president Ralph Budd, and the local high school adopted it as the nickname for its athletic teams.

== Reception ==
The film made a profit of $107,000, approximately $2,196,000 in February 2022 dollars.
