= Minnesota Zephyr =

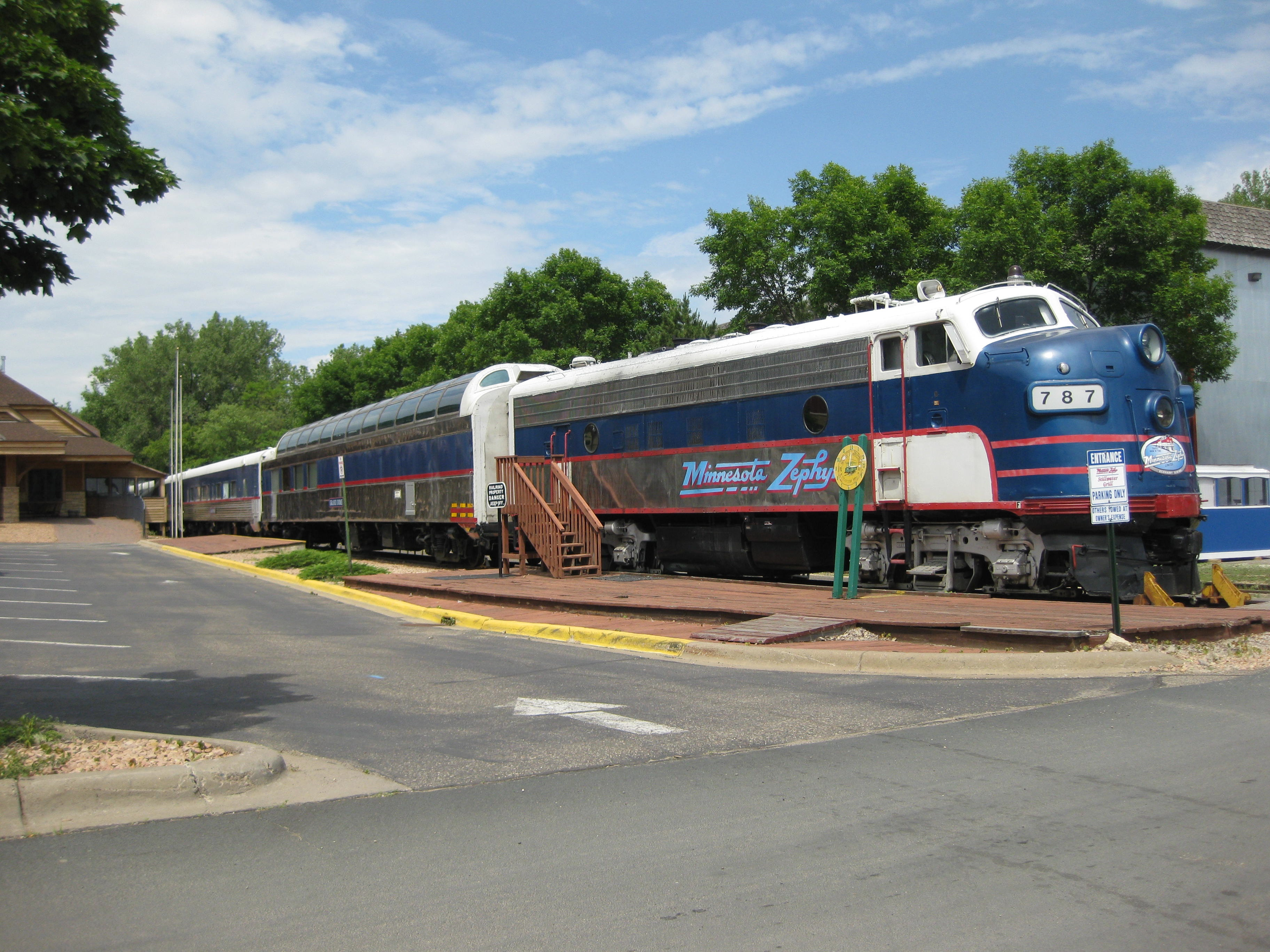
Minnesota Zephyr 787 (ex SP&S 804) parked at Stillwater in 2010

The Minnesota Zephyr was a heritage railroad operating out of Stillwater, Minnesota. It operated as a dinner train and served a five-course, white linen dinner on a six-mile route, traveling between four and seven miles per hour. Power was provided by two EMD F7 locomotives, with one on each end of the train. The rolling stock consisted of five restored dining cars. The train traveled along the St. Croix River bluffs, then turned westward and followed a stream. The trip lasted about three and a half hours.

On September 18, 2008, owner David Paradeau stated that the train would cease operation at the end of the year, becoming a stationary restaurant serving dinner along with the adjacent Stillwater Grill. Paradeau cited the desire to retire, as well as a downturn in business and a $1.6 million loss within the last two years. Paradeau had hoped to sell the railroad right of way to the Minnesota Department of Natural Resources to be converted to a rail trail that would connect Stillwater to the Gateway State Trail system. Operating for some 23 years, the train had served close to a million dining patrons by the time of closure.

Tracks connecting the Zephyr line south to the Union Pacific Railroad through downtown Stillwater were removed in summer 2005 after the city of Stillwater forced abandonment of the tracks. No rail service had been provided on the line since 1995 when the last steam engine visited Stillwater.

The line was the first railroad built into Stillwater. Work stopped late in December 1870 when the ground became too hard to finish the work. The last mile of track was finally laid into Stillwater in spring, 1871 after the ground thawed. Two more rail lines were built into Stillwater from the south end before the 1890s. The last Burlington Northern freight train to leave Stillwater on the line was in 1982. Burlington Northern had submitted a bid to deliver coal via the line to the King power plant in 1985 but the bid was won by Chicago and North Western (now Union Pacific).

On September 10, 2010, the Minnesota DNR expressed renewed interest in and laid out plans for the Minnesota Zephyr

In February 2012, sale of the right-of-way was finalized to the Minnesota DNR for 4.37 million dollars. The sale to the DNR did not include the dinner train (engines and cars) itself or the Zephyr building. Rails and ties were removed to prepare the right of way to be made into a walking and biking trail. The Minnesota Department of Natural Resources has paved the entire route, starting from downtown Stillwater and ending at a junction with the Gateway State Trail. DNR also constructed a new pedestrian/cycling bridge to the west over Manning Avenue (County Road 15). The trail officially opened in June 2015. The right of way is also being considered as a route for a future light rail line into Stillwater.

In early 2013, Iowa Pacific Holdings purchased the train to use on their Rio Grande Scenic Railroad subsidiary. In March 2013, the dining cars were shipped by rail to Colorado for overhaul. In November 2014, it was announced that Iowa Pacific had also purchased the two F7 locomotives and would be moving them in December. Today, the rail line has been converted into the Brown's Creek State Bike Trail and the old train depot is a live performance theater for downtown Stillwater named after its history- The Zephyr Theatre.

In May 2026, Minnesota Zephyr 787 (ex Spokane Portland and Seattle locomotive 804) was renumbered back to 804 and transported to the Inland Northwest Rail Museum in Reardan, Washington from Alamosa, Colorado. Inland Northwest Rail Museum plans to repaint the locomotive back to its original SP&S livery.
