= Mark Twain Zephyr =

American trainset

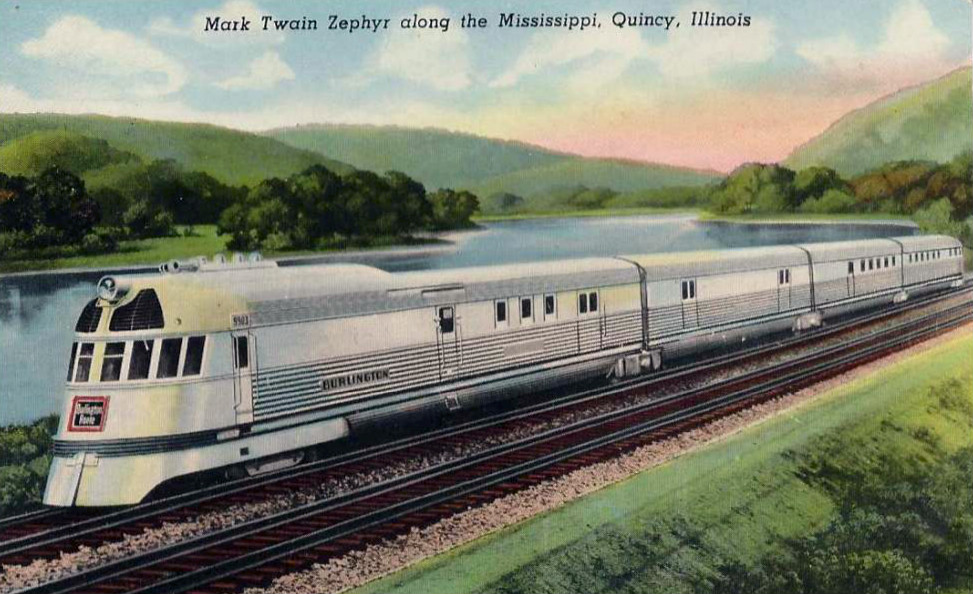
- Mark Twain Zephyr along the Mississippi, Quincy, Illinois
Type and origin
- Power type: Diesel-electric
- Designer: Albert Dean
- Builder: Budd Company
- Build date: 1935
- Total produced: 1
Specifications
- Configuration
  - AAR: B-2
- Gauge: 4 ft 8 1/2 in (1,435 mm) standard gauge
- Bogies: Jacobs
- Fuel type: Diesel
- Prime mover: Winton 201-A
- Cylinders: 8
Career
- Operators: Chicago, Burlington and Quincy Railroad
- Locale: North America
- Disposition: preserved

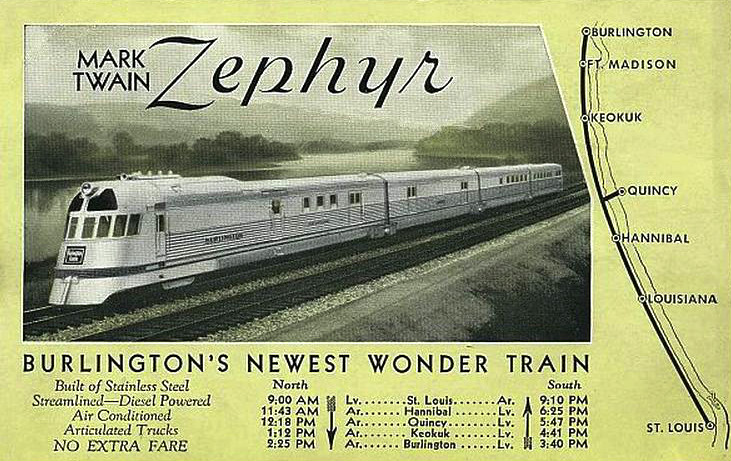
Postcard depiction of the train circa 1935

The Mark Twain Zephyr was an early diesel four-unit articulated zephyr train that was similar to the Pioneer Zephyr in style. The train was built by the Budd Company and was powered by a diesel engine produced by the Winton Engine Company. The train was named after the renowned author Mark Twain because it was scheduled to provide service from St. Louis, Missouri to Burlington, Iowa via his hometown Hannibal, Missouri. The train's exterior structure used stainless steel, and had a "shovel nose" front.

The power car, number 9903, was named Injun Joe. The three trailer cars received other names of Mark Twain characters: Becky Thatcher, Tom Sawyer and Huck Finn. The train was christened on October 25, 1935, in Hannibal by Nina Clemens Gabilowitsch (1910-1966), the granddaughter and ultimately last descendant of its namesake. The ceremony was broadcast coast to coast on CBS radio. Two days later, it entered revenue service.

== CB&Q ownership ==
The Mark Twain Zephyr was operated by the Chicago, Burlington and Quincy Railroad between October 1935 and April 1958.

While the train's "home route" was considered the railroad line between Burlington, Iowa and St. Louis, Missouri via Hannibal, Missouri, the train only spent about half of its 22.5-year life operating on that route. The equipment was frequently used on other CB&Q routes, most notably: Chicago to Denver, Colorado (1936); Chicago to St. Paul, Minnesota (a few weeks in 1936); St. Louis to Kansas City, Missouri (various extended periods between 1937 and 1942); Dallas to Houston (a few months in 1938); and Galesburg, Illinois to St. Joseph, Missouri (1953-1957).

The Mark Twain Zephyr made newspaper headlines following two 1948 accidents: On Saturday, July 31, 1948, the train derailed at the railroad bridge over Devils Creek about four miles west of Viele, Iowa. Only two passengers sustained minor injuries. On Wednesday, October 17, 1948, the trainset was again damaged by hitting a loaded sand truck at Spring Grove, Iowa. Neither the passengers nor the truck driver were hurt.

In the early 1950s, the Mark Twain Zephyr had two separate incidents involving Mississippi River barges while operating on the CB&Q's 'K-Line', which parallels the busy shipping waterway in Iowa. The first (and most serious) event occurred on Thursday, November 16, 1950. According to news reports, an empty oil barge belonging to the W.C. Harms Company went up on shore north of Keokuk, Iowa, and over the track. The cars 'Injun Joe' and 'Becky Thatcher' derailed after striking the barge. There was only one minor injury, and the 19 passengers continued to Burlington via a Keokuk City bus. Rail traffic had to be rerouted via the Carthage branch until the two units could be re-railed. The first wrecker sent from Galesburg was too light for the task so a second wrecker had to be sent. Less than one year later, on Sunday, August 19, 1951, newspaper reports indicate that a barge again was washed ashore over the tracks near the exact same spot in Keokuk. Luckily, the engineer was able to stop in time and the train did not hit it. There was, however, a delay for workers to clear the tracks.

In many ways, the articulated design of the Mark Twain Zephyr, which was done to make the train more aerodynamic, became its own downfall. Owing to the fixed design, the CB&Q could not add additional cars to the trainset during peak travel periods. Crews often had to set up folding chairs in the baggage car for overflow seating, especially during holiday weekends and even for the weekly southbound run into St. Louis on Sunday evenings. The Mark Twain Zephyr saw its last day of operation on April 27, 1958. It was replaced by trains that could have coaches added or subtracted due to demand.

== Previous private ownership ==
After being retired by the Chicago, Burlington and Quincy Railroad (CB&Q) in April 1958, the Mark Twain Zephyr was put into storage at a locomotive shop in West Burlington, Iowa.

In June 1960, the Mark Twain Zephyr was purchased by Charles "Frank" Dashner of Glenwood, Iowa. Dashner's original plan was to sell the train to Cuba; however, rising tensions over Communism and the Cuban Missile Crisis quickly put an end to that opportunity. Dashner then wanted to develop the Mark Twain Zephyr into a rail-themed restaurant and motel, which would have been located at the then newly built Interstate 29 and U.S. Highway 34 intersection. Before Dashner could make the final payment on the Mark Twain Zephyr, he died on February 24, 1961, at the age of 51. The train, pending final payment, had not been moved from the CB&Q Shops in West Burlington, Iowa. Dashner's widow and two then-teenage children had no interest in continuing to own the train. Thus, ownership reverted to the CB&Q, who put it up for sale again.

In June 1962, the Mark Twain Zephyr was purchased by Ernie A. Hayes of Mount Pleasant, Iowa. Hayes owned an insurance company and was a community activist promoting tourism to Mount Pleasant and Southeast Iowa. Hayes was also the creator and developer of the Avenue of the Saints, a highway linking the Twin Cities and St. Louis. The train was moved to Mount Pleasant in September 1962, where it was kept at the Old Thresher's Reunion site in McMillan Park. Hayes encouraged the Midwest Central Railroad, which was part of Old Threshers Reunion, to construct a standard gauge loop track so the train could be put into service as a regional tourist attraction.

In December 1968, Hayes donated the Mark Twain Zephyr outright to the Old Thresher's Reunion and Midwest Central Railroad in hopes of spurring interest. The train remained at their McMillan Park property in Mount Pleasant, Iowa, for the next 11 years. The Boards of Directors of Old Thresher's Reunion and the Midwest Central Railroad were often at odds as to whether it was worth the money to pay for its restoration and build the track needed for it to operate. Some officials felt it would be worth it; others felt their organization's limited funds should be spent on old steam tractors instead. It suffered significant damage from vandalism during the 1970s while in Mount Pleasant and was never restored or operated. During the winter of 1978–1979, Lennis Moore, the then-new CEO of Old Thresher's Reunion and the Midwest Central Railroad, persuaded the Board to begin looking for buyers.

In the Spring of 1979, the train was purchased by Alexander Barket Sr., a prominent Kansas City bank president and real estate promoter specializing in the rehabilitation of commercial buildings. Earlier, Barket had purchased and refurbished more than two dozen passenger cars from the original CB&Q Denver Zephyr and Texas Zephyr; however, he sold them to a railroad in Saudi Arabia in 1976 to pay off mounting legal bills. Barket Sr. planned to restore the Mark Twain Zephyr and possibly turn it into a tourist railroad that would carry passengers through nearby Swope Park in Kansas City. However, he died unexpectedly in June 1979 while the train cars were being moved from Mount Pleasant, Iowa to a siding on the southwest side of Kansas City.

After Barket Sr.'s untimely death, settling his estate became a complicated tangle of lawsuits involving his various companies, creditors, family members, and others. Ownership of the Mark Twain Zephyr finally ended up with Westgate Bancshares, Inc., which was headed up by Ken A. Wilson. A 1983 appraisal reported the Mark Twain Zephyr was worth $600,000 "as-is", but had the potential of being worth $6,000,000 if fully restored. The bank and its various brokers struggled for several years to find potential buyers. Wilson confirmed that recording artist Neil Young almost purchased the train during this time period with intentions to restore it and use as a touring vehicle for himself and his band. However, the deal fell through when Young realized the difficult logistics of dealing with freight railroads for every move.

Dave Simpson (a 1970 draftee of the Buffalo Bills) became the seventh private owner of the Mark Twain Zephyr in 1983. However, little work was done by Simpson on the train. During this period, the train remained parked on an industrial siding on the southeast side of Kansas City.

In September 1987, the trainset was purchased by a trio of Chicago-area businessmen (Dan Krupske, John C. Lowe, and Ronald Lorenzini), who formed Mark Twain Zephyr, Inc. Soon after purchasing the cars they moved them to the Mid America Car Corporation, a business on the north side of Kansas City that refurbished railroad cars. Krupske, Lowe, and Lorenzini had hopes of teaming with Coors, who they anticipated would pick up the majority of the restoration costs in exchange for the rights to lease the train for a period of time. The marketing campaign would promote "Silver Bullet" Beer.

In 1988, a discussion between Coors and Mark Twain Zephyr, Inc. ended without an agreement. Krupske, Lowe, and Lorenzini decided to relocate the train closer to where they lived. Between October 1988 and May 1997, the Mark Twain Zephyr was stored on various sidings at the Joliet Army Ammunition Plant. During this period, Mark Twain Zephyr, Inc. was in talks with various other potential partners. Ideas included construction of a Twain-themed amusement park in Bettendorf, Iowa, a dinner train from Chicago to the Quad Cities, and a stationary restaurant and hotel in Downers Grove or DeKalb, Illinois.

In 1997, the federal government began redevelopment of the Joliet Army Ammunition Plant into the Midewin National Tallgrass Prairie. All railroad sidings, including the ones where the Mark Twain Zephyr had been parked for the previous decade, were to be removed. Krupske, Lowe, and Lorenzini then made a partnership deal with the Relco Locomotive Shops in Minooka, Illinois to store the train. It remained on this property from May 1997 to January 2008. Relco and Mark Twain Zephyr, Inc. could not find additional investors or capital to restore the train. The original Winton engine and trucks/wheels were removed, but not much other work was done.

In late 2007, Relco decided to completely shut down its Minooka Plant. This forced Mark Twain Zephyr, Inc. to find another home for the train. In January 2008, the Mark Twain Zephyr was moved down to Gateway Rail Services in Madison, Illinois in the St. Louis Metropolitan Area. Gateway Rail Services had two shop buildings and a dedicated staff to refurbish old passenger railroad cars. Management was interested in getting the contract to do the rebuild of the Mark Twain Zephyr, a deal that would have been worth millions of dollars. Unfortunately, not much was done to improve the train during the 12 years it remained at Gateway Rail Services. The Mark Twain Zephyr had basically become an empty stainless steel shell sitting along a fence on the property.

== Current ownership and operations ==
The Wisconsin Great Northern Railroad, a family-owned and operated company located in Trego, Wisconsin, purchased the Mark Twain Zephyr from Mark Twain Zephyr, Inc. on February 19, 2020. The sale was officially closed on June 30, 2020. The Wisconsin Great Northern's owners, Greg and Mardell Vreeland, made their purchase public on July 27, 2020, through exclusive news articles in Trains magazine and the Milwaukee Journal-Sentinel.

The four cars of the Mark Twain Zephyr and a spare car of the Pioneer Zephyr were moved from Madison, Illinois to Trego, Wisconsin by semi-truck (Over the Top Contractors) between August 1, 2020, and September 4, 2020. A full-time crew of electricians, carpenters, and other skilled craftspeople employed by the Wisconsin Great Northern Railroad, working on a complete overhaul, placed the cars on trucks and intends to install an EMD 567 prime mover. Once restored, the Wisconsin Great Northern Railroad plans to operate the Mark Twain Zephyr on its main railroad line between Trego and Springbrook, Wisconsin.
