= List of streamlined trainsets =

The following trainsets are or were streamliners.

== Australia ==
- XPT (based on the British InterCity 125)

== Chile ==
- Flecha Del Sur AM-100 Series (based on the German Flying Hamburger)

== France ==
- SNCF TGV Atlantique
- SNCF TGV Duplex
- SNCF TGV Iris 320
- SNCF TGV La Poste
- SNCF TGV POS
- SNCF TGV Réseau
- SNCF TGV Sud-Est
- SNCF TGV Thalys PBKA
- TGV 001

== Germany ==
- DRG Class SVT 877 Flying Hamburger
- DRG Class SVT 137
- DB Class VT 11.5 TEE
- ICE 1
- ICE 2
- ICE 3
- ICE 4

== Italy ==
- FS Class ETR 200 original Thirties
- FS Class ETR 240 Polifemo (valentino Nineties special service)
- FS Class ETR 250 Arlecchino
- FS Class ETR 300 Settebello
- FS Class ETR 500 Rapido
- Frecciarossa 1000

== Japan ==
- E1 Series Shinkansen
- E2 Series Shinkansen
- E3 Series Shinkansen
- E4 Series Shinkansen
- E5 Series Shinkansen
- E6 Series Shinkansen
- H5 Series Shinkansen
- N700 Series Shinkansen

== Korea ==
- KTX-I

== Netherlands ==
- Mat' 34
- Mat' 35
- Mat' 36
- omBC
- Mat' 40
- DE-5
- Mat' 46
- Plan X Blauwe Engel
- Plan Z/ICMm Koploper
- V250
- ICNG

== Philippines ==
- MRR Rail Motor Coaches (post-1929 units)
- PNR Japanese Motor Car (JMC) No. 319 Luster, later MC-6366 Nikkō
- PNR Airport Express Trains
- PNR D8800 class

== Poland ==
- Luxtorpeda “Motor-Express Train”
- Pm36-1

== Spain ==
- AVE Class 100
- AVE Class 101
- AVE Class 102
- AVE Class 103

== Taiwan ==
- THSR 700T

== United Kingdom ==
- Advanced Passenger Train
- Blue Pullman
- GWR railcars
- InterCity 125
- InterCity 225
- British Rail Class 180
- British Rail Class 220 Voyager
- British Rail Class 221 Super Voyager
- British Rail Class 222
- British Rail Class 373
- British Rail Class 374
- British Rail Class 390 Pendolino
- British Rail Class 395 Javelin
- British Rail Class 397
- British Rail Class 800
- British Rail Class 801
- British Rail Class 802

== United States ==
=== 21st century trainsets ===
Amtrak:

- Acela Express (trainset)
- Avelia Liberty
- Siemens Charger and Siemens Venture trainsets

Brightline:

- SCB-40 and Siemens Venture trainsets

=== 20th century trainsets ===
Atchison, Topeka and Santa Fe:

- Aerotrain (GM) (San Diegan)

Boston and Maine / Maine Central

- Flying Yankee (No. 6000)

Chicago, Burlington & Quincy:

- Ak-Sar-Ben Zephyr
- American Royal Zephyr
- General Pershing Zephyr
- Nebraska Zephyr
- Pioneer Zephyr
- Silver Streak Zephyr
- Twin Cities Zephyr
- Zephyr Rocket

Chicago, Rock Island and Pacific

- Aerotrain (GM) (2 trainsets)
- Jet Rocket
- Rocky Mountain Rocket
- Texas Rocket

Gulf, Mobile and Northern

- Rebel

Illinois Central:

- Green Diamond
- Illinois Central 121

Milwaukee Road

- Hiawatha
- Olympian Hiawatha

Nashville, Chattanooga and St Louis Railway

- City of Memphis

New York Central

- 20th Century Limited
- Aerotrain (GM)
- Empire State Express
- Mercury

New York, New Haven and Hartford

- Comet
- Dan'l Webster
- John Quincy Adams
- Roger Williams

Pennsylvania Railroad

- Aerotrain (GM) (The Pennsy)
- The Broadway Limited
- The Jeffersonian
- The South Wind
- The Trail Blazer

Union Pacific:

- Aerotrain (GM) (City of Las Vegas)
- M-10000
- M-10001
- M-10002
- M-10003 through M-10006
