= 1947 in rail transport =

This article lists events related to rail transport that occurred in 1947.

== Events ==
=== January events ===
- January 1 – The Companhia dos Caminhos de Ferro Portugueses is reconstituted and takes over concessions of most private railway companies in Portugal.
- January 19 – The Baltimore and Ohio Railroad inaugurates the Cincinnatian passenger train between Baltimore, Maryland, and Cincinnati, Ohio.

=== February events ===
- February 1 – William Neal succeeds D'Alton Corry Coleman as president of Canadian Pacific Railway.
- February 18 – Pennsylvania Railroad's Red Arrow passenger train derails at Gallatin, Pennsylvania; 24 people are killed in the accident.
- February 25 – Hachikō Line derailment: The worst-ever train accident in Japan kills 184 people.
- February 28 – The Illinois Central Railroad withdraws the Illinois Central 121 streamlined trainset from the Green Diamond Chicago-St. Louis service.

=== March events ===
- March 4 – Ms. Friedel Klussman launches a drive to preserve the San Francisco cable car system.

=== April events ===
- April 7 – Ellis D. Atwood completes the original Edaville Railroad on his cranberry plantation at South Carver, Massachusetts, United States. This 2 ft (610 mm) narrow gauge line, using equipment from Maine, is generally regarded as the world’s first tourist railroad.
- April 27 – After a complete overhaul, the Illinois Central 121 trainset re-enters active service, this time between Jackson, Mississippi, and New Orleans, Louisiana, as the Miss-Lou passenger train.

=== May events ===
- May – Baldwin Locomotive Works completes the last two steam locomotives built for the narrow gauge White Pass and Yukon Route.
- May 5 – Sixteen people die in the Camp Mountain train disaster when a crowded picnic train derails on a sharp left-hand curve between Ferny Grove and Camp Mountain stations on the now-closed Dayboro line, approximately 20 km(12.4 miles) northwest of Brisbane, Queensland, Australia.
- May 18 – Seaboard Air Line Railroad inaugurates the Silver Comet passenger train between New York City and Birmingham, Alabama.
- May 26 – General Motors Electro-Motive Division and Pullman-Standard's streamlined Train of Tomorrow enters demonstration passenger service in North America.
- May 31 – The Gulf, Mobile and Ohio Railroad acquires the Chicago and Alton Railroad.

=== June events ===
- June 6 – The Pere Marquette Railroad is merged into the Chesapeake and Ohio Railway.
- June 16 – The last passenger service is operated on the Nickey line.
- June 29 – The Milwaukee Road inaugurates the Olympian Hiawatha passenger train between Chicago, Illinois and Tacoma, Washington. Simultaneously, the railroad revives the Columbian, operating on the same route.

=== July events ===
- July 1 – The Maine Central Railroad begins operation of EMD E7 locomotives with stainless steel passenger cars.

=== August events ===
- August 6 – The Transport Act 1947 is passed by the Parliament of the United Kingdom providing for the nationalisation of all major British railways in 1948.

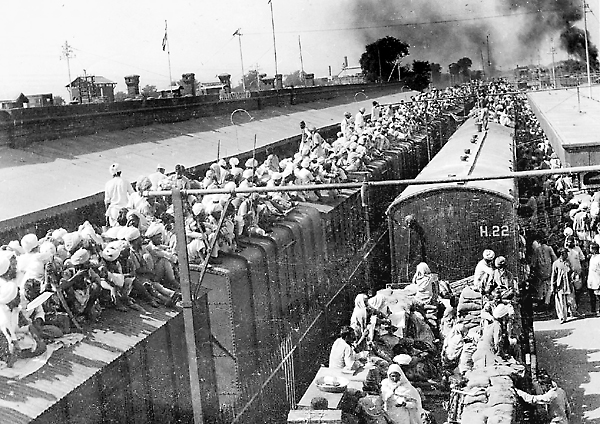
Refugees at a railway station in Punjab following the Partition of India

- August 14–15 – The Partition of India leads to transfer of large parts of the North Western, Bengal Assam and Jodhpur Railways to a new Pakistan Railways organisation, and large-scale population transfer between the two countries by rail. The Jammu–Sialkot Line is abandoned as a through route.

=== September events ===
- September 1 – Dugald, Manitoba, Canada: A Canadian National Railway passenger train fails to take the siding and collides with the No. 4 Transcontinental that is standing on the main line. Thirty-one people are killed.
- September 17 – The American Freedom Train, carrying the original versions of the United States Constitution, Declaration of Independence and the Bill of Rights, begins a two-year tour of the United States starting in Philadelphia, Pennsylvania. See also American Freedom Train - 1947-1949 station stops

=== October events ===
- October 1 – The Chicago Transit Authority (CTA) begins operating the local transit (buses and 'L'-Subway rapid transit) systems in Chicago after acquiring the properties of the former Chicago Surface Lines and the Chicago Rapid Transit Company.
- October 18 – Alaska Railroad inaugurates the Aurora passenger train service between Fairbanks and Anchorage.

=== December events ===
- December 3 – French communist strikers derail the Paris-Tourcoing express train because of false rumours that it is transporting soldiers – 21 dead.

=== Unknown date events ===
- The first diesel locomotives enter mainline operation on the Southern Pacific Railroad.
- The Southern Pacific Railroad is reincorporated in Delaware.
- The City of Los Angeles train frequency is upgraded to daily.
- The Super Chief train frequency is upgraded to daily.
- Lima Locomotive Works is merged with General Machinery Corporation of Hamilton, OH. The new company is named Lima-Hamilton.
- The components of the former M-10002 streamliner trainset are scrapped.
- The last United States Fish and Wildlife Service fish car is taken out of service.
- The Richmond, Fredericksburg and Potomac Railroad inaugurates its Old Dominion passenger train between Washington, DC, and Richmond, Virginia.
