= Silver Star Cafe =

Restaurant in Port Hedland, Australia

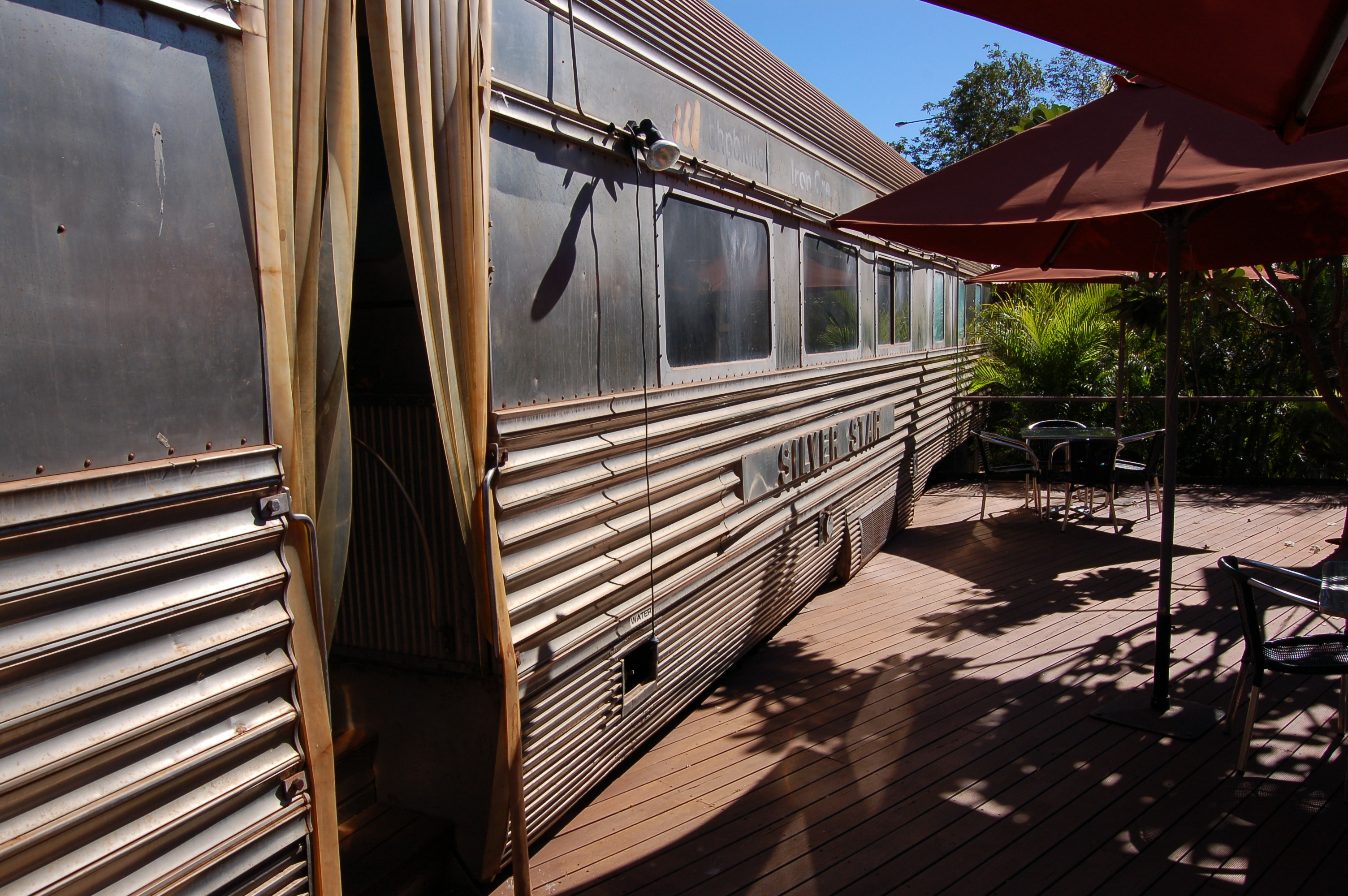
- The Silver Star Cafe and alfresco deck, 2012.
- Interactive map of Silver Star Cafe

Restaurant information
- Established: 26 October 2010
- Food type: Modern Australian
- Dress code: Casual
- Location: 12a Edgar Street, Port Hedland, Western Australia, 6721, Australia
- Coordinates: 20°18′43″S 118°34′36″E
- Seating capacity: 75

The Silver Star Cafe is a restaurant in the west end of Port Hedland, Western Australia. Its kitchen and lounge area are housed within a historic preserved railway carriage, and it has an alfresco deck alongside. A project of BHP Billiton Iron Ore, with support from Town of Port Hedland, Boom Logistics and Laing O'Rourke, the cafe was officially opened by the Premier of Western Australia, Colin Barnett, on 26 October 2010.

== History ==
=== United States ===
The railway carriage that is now the nucleus of the Silver Star Cafe was built by the Budd Company in 1939, for the Chicago, Burlington & Quincy Railroad (CB&QR). A diner-parlour and observation car, it was assigned the fleet number 301, and was named the Silver Star.

Together with two passenger cars, the Silver Leaf and the Silver Eagle, and a power car, the Silver Charger, the Silver Star made up the General Pershing Zephyr, a streamliner train named after General John Pershing. On 30 April 1939, the train made its inaugural passenger trip between St Louis and Kansas City, Missouri, in the Midwestern United States.

Pershing was a World War I veteran, who became the Chief of Staff of the United States Army. He was born and raised in a town not far from the train's route. The names Silver Leaf, Silver Eagle and Silver Star all corresponded to US Army badges of rank, while the Silver Charger was named after one of the general's horses.

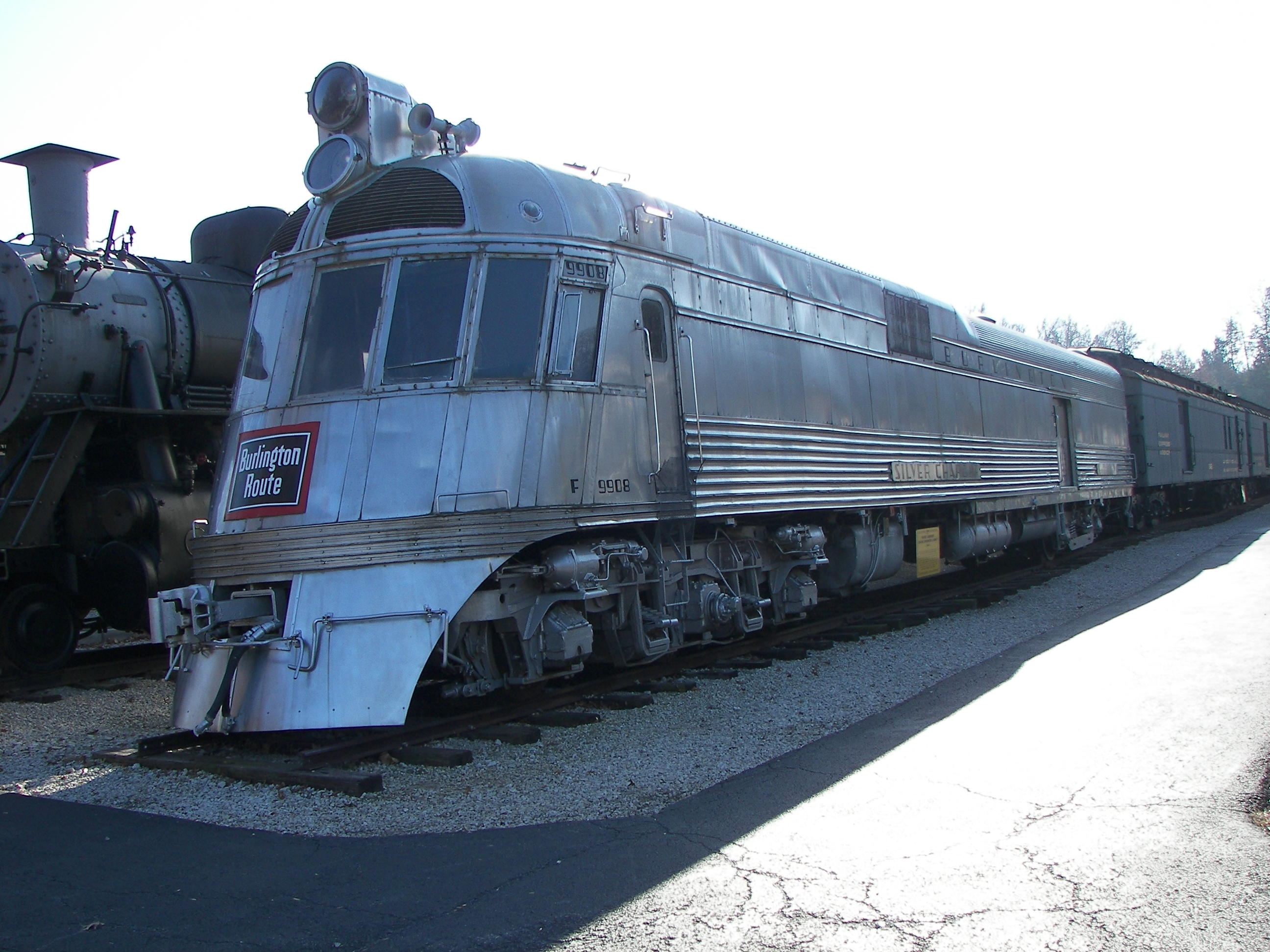
The Silver Charger, 2008

The General Pershing Zephyr was the ninth and last in a series of "shovelnose" Zephyr streamliners operated by the CB&QR, and the only one made up of non-articulated cars. The "shovelnose" Zephyrs were lighter and faster than their contemporaries, because they were made of lightweight stainless steel, to a unique "streamlined" design. Although the earlier, articulated, versions of these trains had the further advantage of a reduced number of trucks (bogies), and no couplers, the General Pershing Zephyr's non-articulated configuration provided maximum flexibility and ease of maintenance.

The Silver Star was the tail-end car in the General Pershing Zephyr. It had a rounded observation end, and was considered to be the train's "most distinguished car". Inside, it was fitted with a dining room 19 feet (5.8 m) in length seating 24 passengers at six tables. At the rounded end was an observation parlour with 22 movable seats, and a kitchen and pantry were at the other end.

The General Pershing Zephyr ran on its assigned route until the United States entered World War II, and then its individual cars continued in use on other trains. As late as 1967, Silver Star was still in the consist of the combined Ak-Sar-Ben Zephyr and American Royal Zephyr. It was withdrawn in 1968.

=== Australia ===
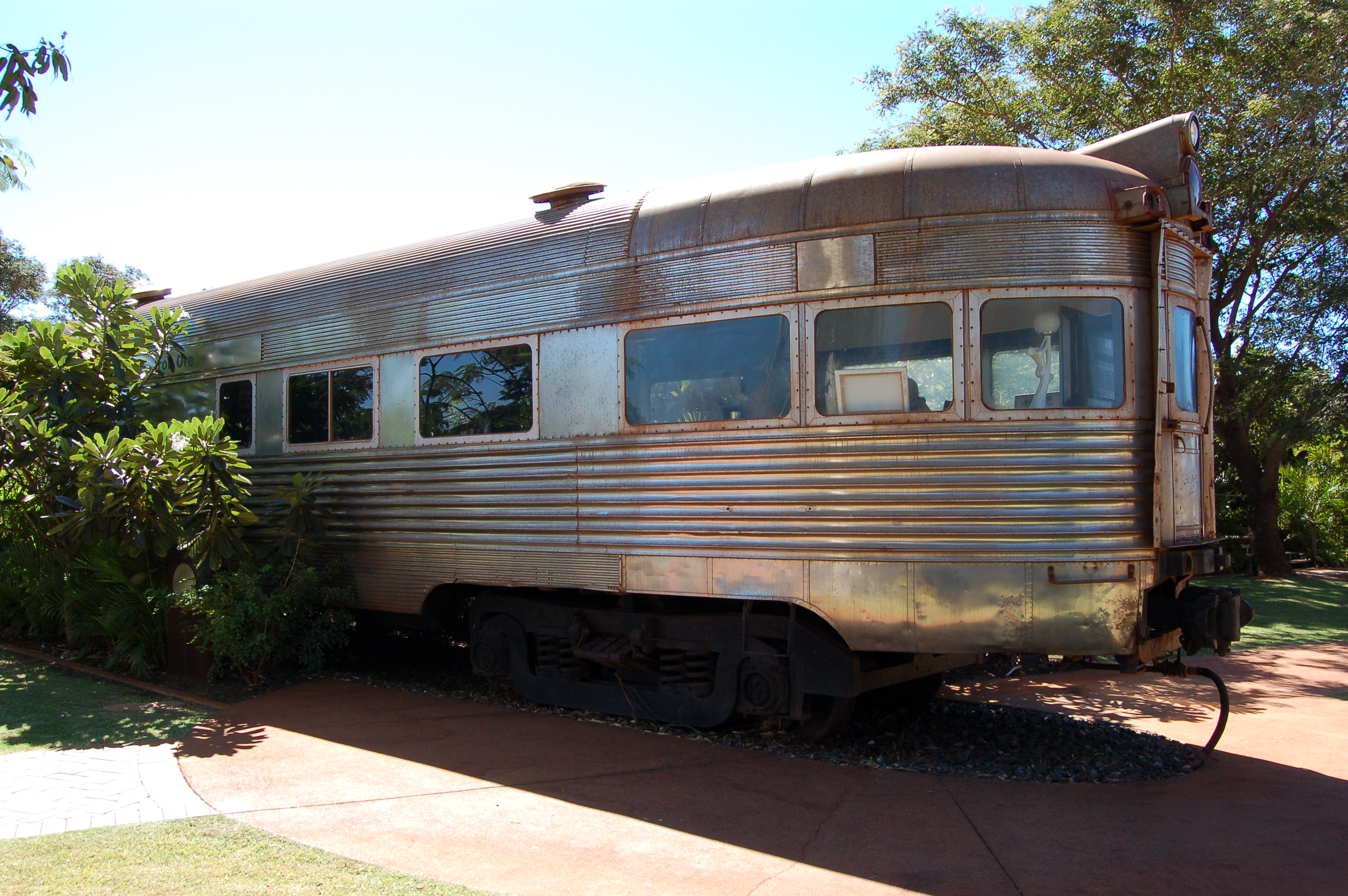
Observation end, Silver Star Cafe, 2012.

By 1974, the first 100 million tonnes of iron ore had been carried between Newman and Port Hedland on the Mount Newman railway in the Pilbara, Western Australia. To celebrate this achievement, US based mining company AMAX, which was then a partner in Mount Newman Mining, presented the Silver Star to the latter company at an official ceremony. Before leaving the United States, it was overhauled by Autoliner Corporation in the style of a contemporary Amtrak carriage. It was fitted with a small diesel engine to power the air conditioning and kitchen, replacing the former axle driven generator.

The carriage was renamed the Sundowner and put into service along the otherwise freight-only Mount Newman railway. For nearly 20 years, it made a weekly round trip from Newman to Port Hedland and back, carrying families and sporting teams on a Friday for shopping and sports fixtures, and returning them to Newman the following Sunday evening. The Sundowner was also used for special trips, including day excursions, VIP functions and Santa Specials. On all of these trips, it offered views of the Pilbara landscape not otherwise visible to its appreciative occupants.

During its service on the Mount Newman railway, the carriage was refurbished and modified inside and out on several occasions. The original kitchen was removed, the galley relocated, and the elegant original interior panelling replaced with Western Australian jarrah timber. The carriage was always maintained in working order, but by the early 21st century had fallen largely into disuse. It was last used for the official opening of the Area C mine in 2003.

In 2009, BHP Billiton Iron Ore, by then the sole owner of the railway, donated the carriage to the Port Hedland community as a visitor attraction and cafe. In co-operation with Form, and with support from Town of Port Hedland, Boom Logistics and Laing O'Rourke, the carriage was relocated from the railway's Nelson Point yard to Perth for refurbishment before moving to the west end of Port Hedland. In its new incarnation as a cafe, it was officially opened by the Premier of Western Australia, Colin Barnett, on 26 October 2010.

== Menu ==
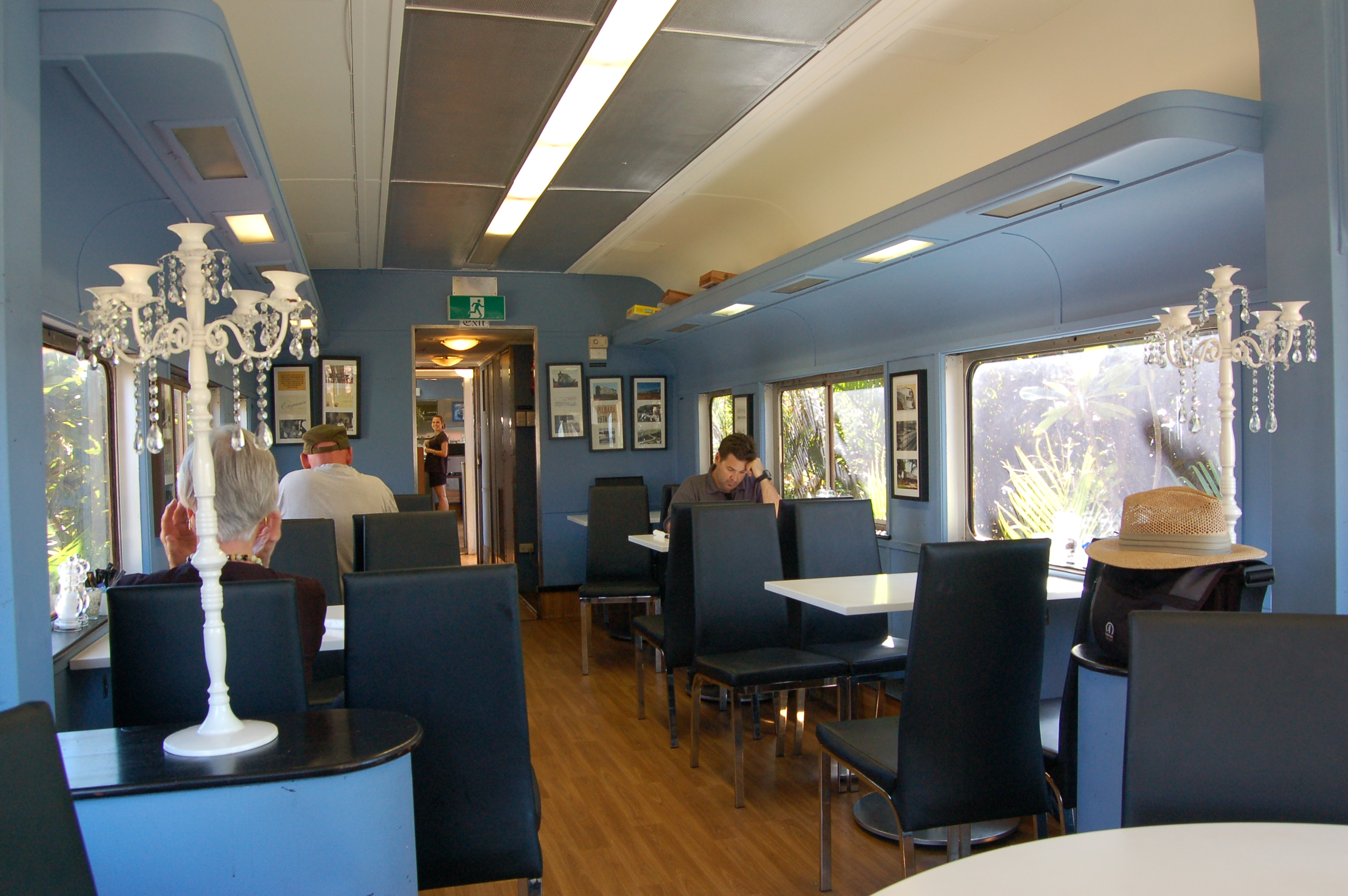
The air conditioned lounge.

Although the kitchen is small, the whole menu is cooked fresh on the premises.

== Reviews ==
According to the Australasian Mining Review, the Silver Star Cafe is "arguably the best breakfast spot in Hedland". The cafe has also been favourably reviewed by Lonely Planet, which praised it as "possibly the coolest cafe in the Pilbara".

== See also ==
- Colonial Tramcar Restaurant
- Don Rhodes Mining and Transport Museum
- List of streamlined trainsets
