= Downers Grove train wreck =

1947 railway accident in Illinois, United States

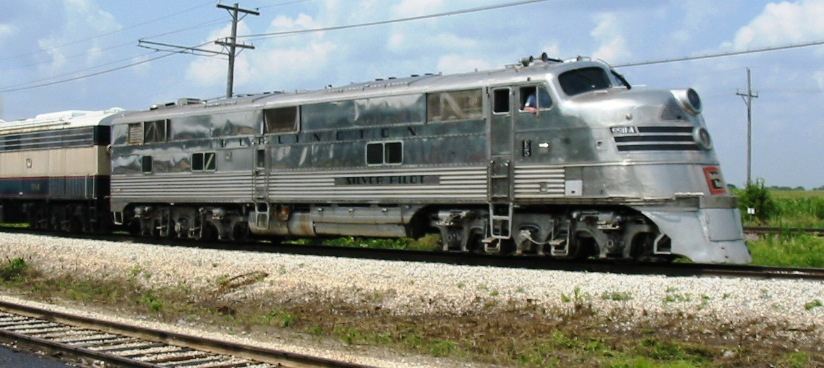
- CB&Q EMD E5

Details
- Date: April 3, 1947; 79 years ago 22:41 CST
- Location: Downers Grove, Illinois
- Coordinates: 41°47′44″N 88°00′32″W
- Country: United States
- Line: Twin Cities Zephyr
- Operator: Chicago, Burlington and Quincy Railroad
- Incident type: Derailment
- Cause: Obstruction on line

Statistics
- Deaths: 3
- Injured: 30+

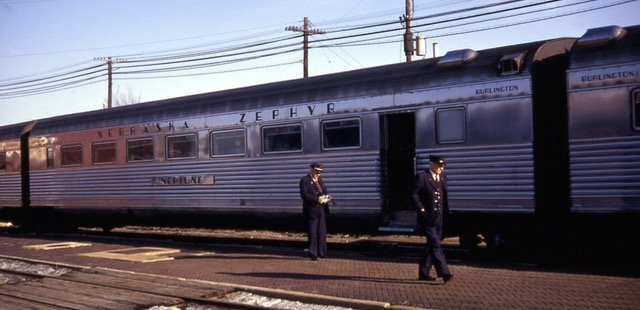
60-seat coach "Neptune" (1968) (sister "Minerva" was in wreck)

The Downers Grove train wreck happened on April 3, 1947, at the Chicago, Burlington and Quincy Railroad station in Downers Grove, Illinois. The Twin Cities Zephyr, a high-speed inter-city passenger train, struck a tractor that had fallen from a freight train only seconds before. Three died and over thirty were injured in the wreck.

The Twin Cities Zephyr (Note: Scheduled as the southbound "Afternoon Zephyr") had left Minneapolis at 5:10 PM with EMD E5 #9914A "Silver Arrow" pulling a seven car trainset called "The Train of the Goddesses" (Note: Five cars of this set, as well as a CB&Q(C&S) E5, are preserved at the Illinois Railway Museum in Union, Illinois). The train carried many college students and others traveling for the coming Easter weekend and was due at Chicago's Union Station at midnight.

At 10:41 PM, approaching the Downers Grove station at about 75 miles per hour (121 km/h), the eastbound Zephyr struck a heavy caterpillar-type tractor which had just fallen off a westbound freight train. The engineer, who later died from his injuries, told rescuers that he saw the tractor fall and immediately applied the brakes. At impact (Note: The impact site was at Forest Ave., one block west of the station) the locomotive went airborne, broke away from the trainset, landed on its side, skidded through the station (Note: A policeman parked in the cab-stand watched the locomotive skid past him, his squad car was damaged by flying debris.), and caught fire. The first two cars jack-knifed into an empty office and waiting room of the brick masonry station building, which by chance had been closed early for the night. The freight train had just cleared the scene when all three tracks running through the depot were torn up.

The response was fast. A signalman from the nearby tower went east and used flares to stop a westbound freight while a brakeman from the Zephyr climbed out a window after the crash and went west to flag a following local passenger train. The fire department, police, and townspeople (along with a Boy Scout troop) quickly began giving aid. Police from nearby towns also came to help, along with state police. After being given first aid at a doctor's office across from the station or in the lobby of the Tivoli Theatre, the injured were taken to the Hinsdale Hospital or Copley Memorial Hospital in Aurora. Two died and more than 30 were injured, the train's engineer died three days later.

Unlike the Naperville train disaster less than a year earlier, there was no question of wrongdoing at the scene. On May 8, 1947, a DuPage County Coroner's jury found that International Harvester (the shipper) and the Burlington were negligent in loading and inspecting the tractor.
