= Don Rhodes Mining and Transport Museum =

Museum in Port Hedland, Western Australia

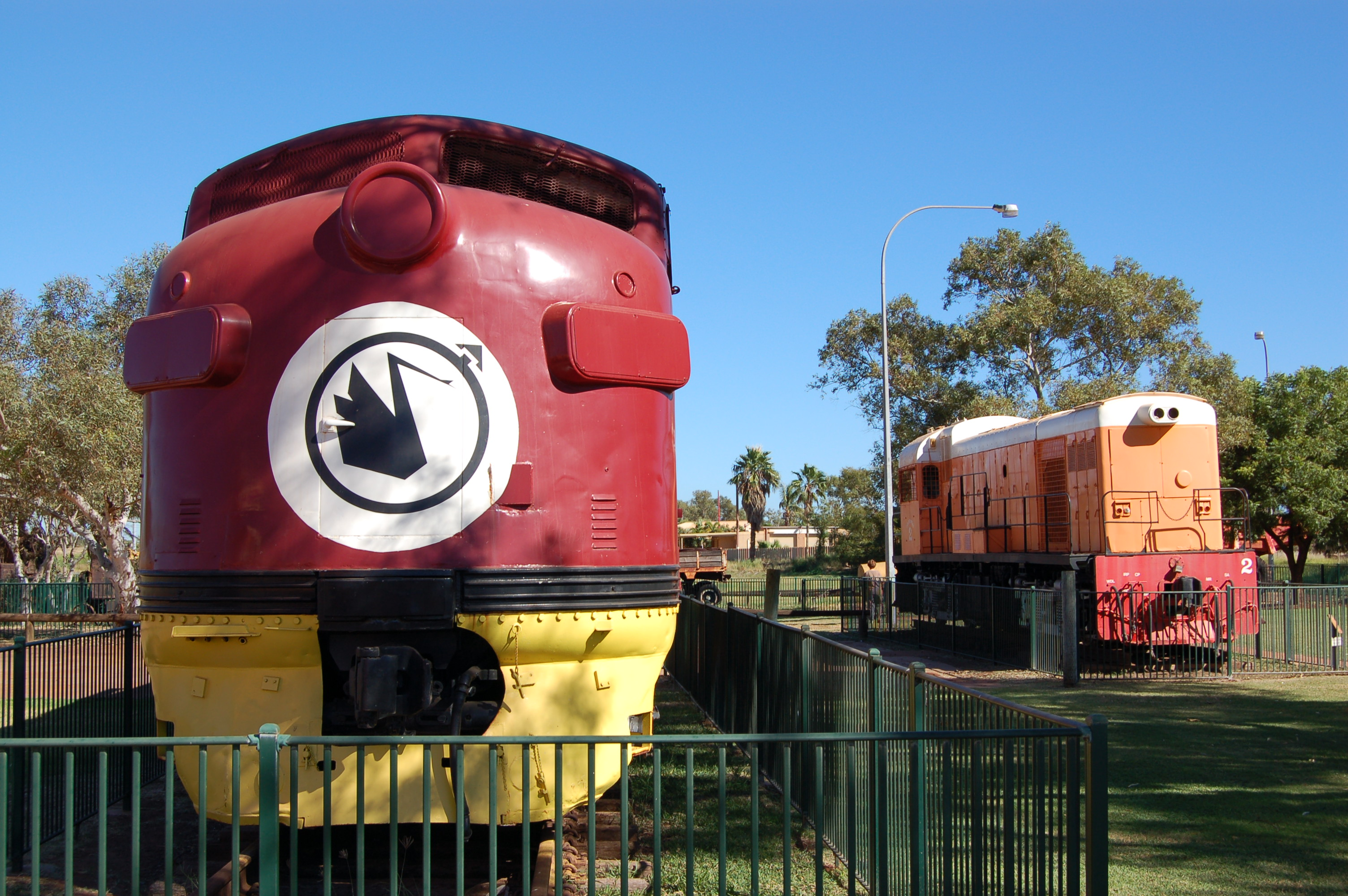
- A view of two of the locomotives on display.
- Location: Wilson Street, Port Hedland, Western Australia
- Coordinates: 20.311472°S 118.605582°E
- Type: Mining museum Transport museum
- Owner: Town of Port Hedland
- Parking: Adjacent (no charge)

The Don Rhodes Mining and Transport Museum is a public park in Port Hedland, Western Australia, with an open-air display of retired mining machinery and railway rollingstock.

Located on Wilson Street, which links the town with the Great Northern Highway and North West Coastal Highway, the museum faces Nelson Point Yard, the northern terminus of the Mount Newman railway.

== History ==
Don Rhodes, after whom the museum is named, was a pioneer of the mining and transport industries in the Pilbara region, and was responsible for commissioning the first modern Australian built roadtrain.

While working manganese leases, Rhodes initially used various English made trucks, but these could not cope with the task. He therefore arranged for his chief engineer, Harold Ridley, to design and build the 70 ton Rhodes Ridley roadtrain, a rig that, when it was completed in 1958, was capable of hauling the company's 100 ton crushing plants.

However, the government of the day ultimately refused to license the Rhodes Ridley or even allow it to operate on gazetted roads. It had done barely 3,000 miles (4,800 km) by the time it was forced to retire.

== Exhibits ==
Three standard gauge locomotives are on display in the centre of the museum. Each of them previously operated on one or both of the mining railways that terminate at Port Hedland (the Goldsworthy railway and the Mount Newman railway).

No.	Locomotive	In service	Builder	Notes	Photograph
2	Goldsworthy Bo-Bo	1965	English Electric	Used in the construction of the Goldsworthy railway between Mount Goldsworthy and Finucane Island. In 1966, it hauled the first ore train from Mt Goldsworthy to Finucane Island.	
5451	EMD F7; Bo-Bo	1951	Electro-Motive Division	Owned originally by Western Pacific Railroad. Purchased in 1967 by Mt Newman Mining. Used on the construction of the Mount Newman railway, then operated the service train until retirement in 1971.	
5497	M636 Co-Co	1975	ALCO / Commonwealth Engineering	Owned originally by Mt Newman Mining, and later by BHP Iron Ore.	

== See also ==
- Silver Star Cafe (Port Hedland)
