= Flecha del Sur =

1940s Chilean diesel multiple unit train

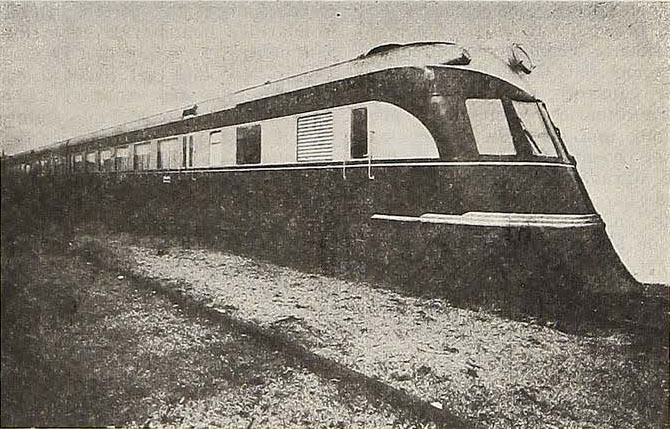
"Flecha del Sur" railcar in 1951.

Flecha del Sur (Arrow of the South) was the name of a diesel multiple unit, numbered AM-100 series, used for the first time on the southern Chilean rail network around 1940. It was Chile's first ever diesel multiple unit.

== Overview ==
The diesel-electric model was custom built in Germany for the Chilean Empresa de los Ferrocarriles del Estado by Maschinenfabrik Augsburg-Nürnberg and FerroStaal A.G. based on the success of the Flying Hamburger series that connected Berlin and Hamburg since 1933 and, as traditional in that time involving government's purchase of rail equipment, part of the payment was made via shipments of lentils. The DMU was made of six three-car units using a Jacobs bogie setup, each one having two 600 hp MAN engines electrified with AEG equipment that accelerated the 124 first class passengers being carried to a maximum speed of 130 km/h. This was built to the 1,676 mm Indian gauge specifications unlike the standard gauge used in the Flying Hamburger. Unlike the original, the DMU's motor car styling, especially for the cab, was inspired by the Pioneer Zephyr manufactured by Budd with the help of General Motors thru EMD.

Two of the fleet were the first DMUs to be operated by EFE, with the rest of the fleet, stored in Swiss territory due to the Second World War, arriving in the country in 1946.

== History ==
The Flecha del Sur DMU made its official first timetable appearances on 7 December 1940. The first two DMUs, shipped into Chile in 1939, numbered AM101-102, originally served Santiago-Concepcion services until 1942.

In the second quarter of 1947, with the arrival of the remainder of the DMUs, services finally reached Puerto Montt.

In 1948 their scheduled frequency was three weekly services in winter and six in summer, starting with the departure at Santiago's Estación Central railway station on 07:00 to reach Puerto Montt's railway station at 00.20.
