= Twin Zephyr =

American trainset

Morning Zephyr Afternoon Zephyr
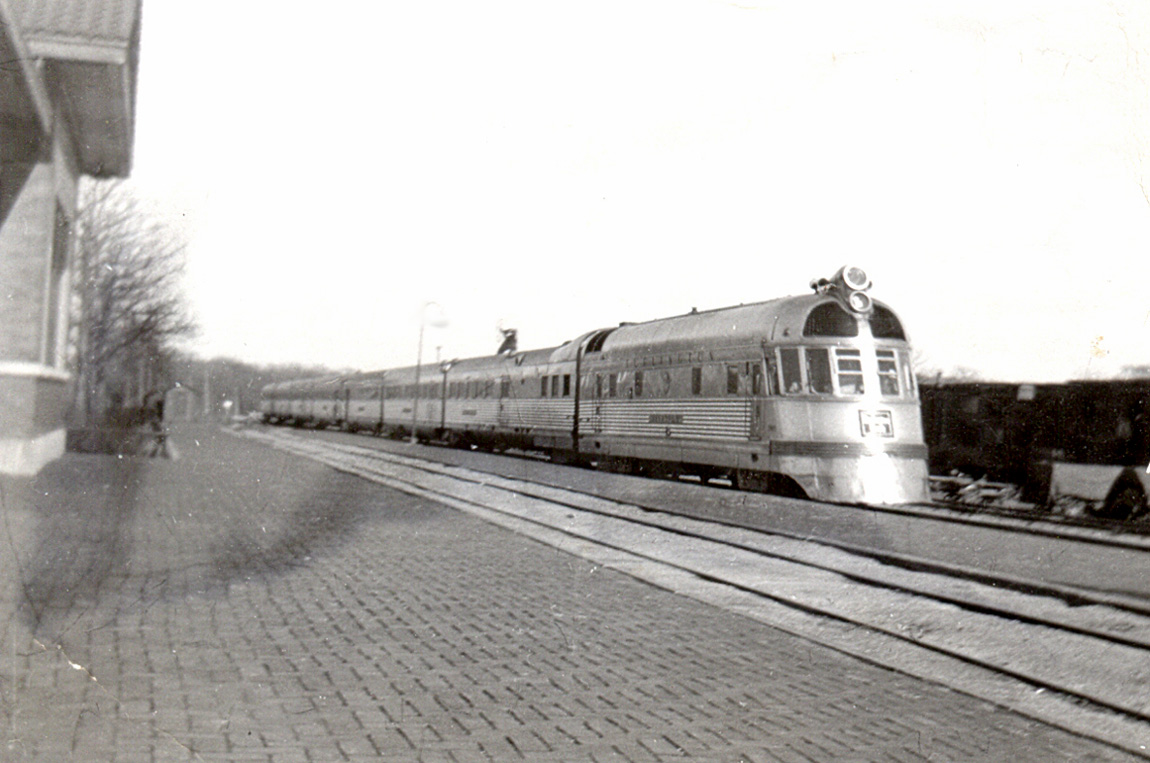
- A Twin Zephyr in Oregon, Illinois, in 1941

Overview
- Service type: Daytime inter-city rail
- Status: Discontinued
- Locale: Minnesota, Wisconsin, Illinois
- First service: April 21, 1935
- Last service: April 30, 1971
- Former operators: Chicago, Burlington and Quincy Railroad (1935–1970); Burlington Northern (1970–1971)

Route
- Termini: Chicago, Illinois; Minneapolis, Minnesota
- Average journey time: 7 hours
- Train number: 21, 22, 23, 24

On-board services
- Classes: Coach and Parlor
- Observation facilities: 1947: Four dome coaches, one dome parlor

Technical
- Rolling stock: 1935: Two articulated 3-sets, 1936: Two articulated 6-sets, 1947: Two sets of 7 non-articulated cars
- Track gauge: 4 ft 8 1/2 in (1,435 mm)

The Twin Zephyrs, also known as the Twin Cities Zephyrs, were a pair of streamlined passenger trains on the Chicago, Burlington and Quincy Railroad (CB&Q), running between Chicago and the Twin Cities of Minneapolis and Saint Paul in Minnesota. It was the second Zephyr service introduced by CB&Q after the record-setting Denver–Chicago "dawn to dusk dash" of the Pioneer Zephyr trainset.

The train competed with the Chicago and North Western's Twin Cities 400 which ceased operation in 1963, and the Milwaukee Road's Twin Cities Hiawatha, which, like the Zephyr, ended with the coming of Amtrak in 1971. The CB&Q trains went west from Chicago to the Mississippi River and along that river to Saint Paul, while the North Western and Milwaukee Road trains traveled via Milwaukee.

== History ==
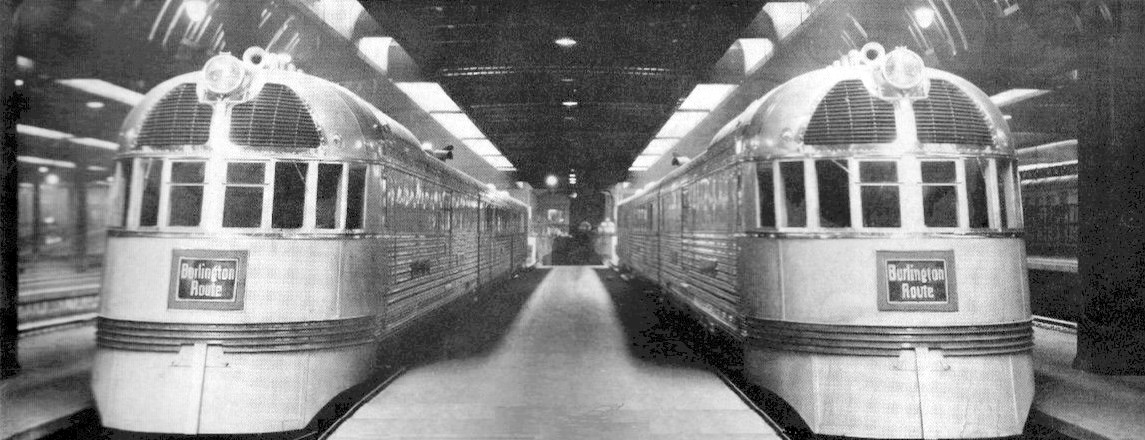
Two Twin Zephyr trains on display in Chicago in 1935 just before entering regular service

Two three-car trainsets, numbered 9901 and 9902, were delivered in April 1935. On April 6 number 9901 made a demonstration run from Chicago to Saint Paul in 5 hours 31 minutes, at speeds up to 104 mph and an average between endpoints of 77.65 mph. These two trainsets proved too small so a second pair of six-car trains with matching locomotives were ordered as replacements. The new trainsets were put on display before they entered service.

The second pair of Twin Zephyrs entered service on December 18, 1936, as the Morning Zephyr and the Afternoon Zephyr. On the first run the two trainsets departed Chicago simultaneously on parallel tracks with 44 pairs of twins as a publicity stunt.

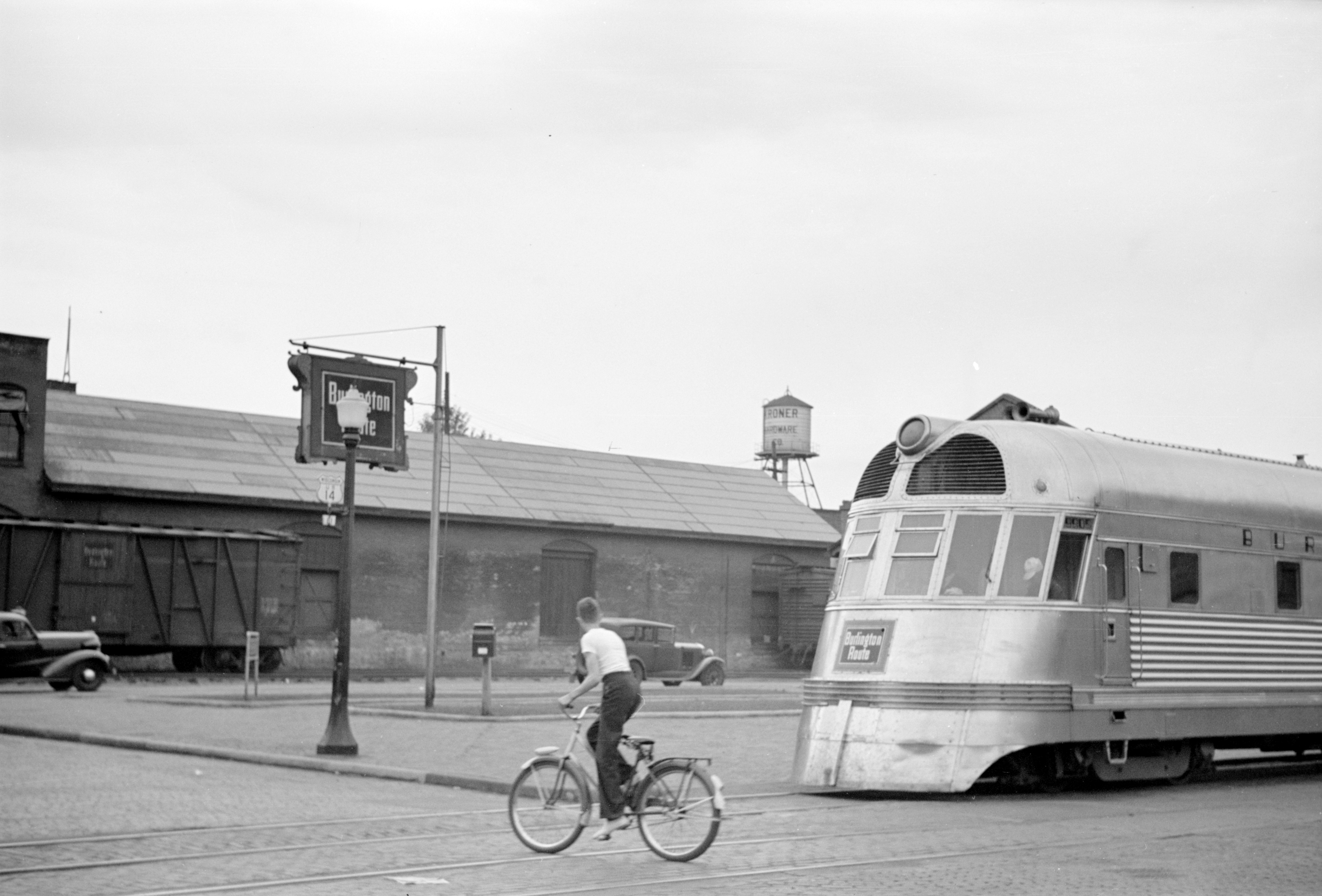
Twin Zephyr at La Crosse, WI, 1939

In 1935 Zephyrs were scheduled to cover 431 miles (694 km) between Chicago and St Paul in six and a half hours, later reduced to six hours and 15 minutes. At first each trainset made one one-way trip a day, but in July 1935 each was making a round trip a day, leaving each terminal at 8:00 AM CST and returning at 10:59 PM. In 1940 the westbound Twin Zephyr took six hours to travel from Chicago to Saint Paul, a start-to-stop average of 71 miles per hour, which is a faster average speed between endpoints than the Acela's average speeds in 2016 between Washington and Boston. According the Burlington, both trains had made the run in five and a half hours, an average of over 78 mph. For several years in the 1950s the schedules along the Mississippi from East Dubuque, Illinois to Prairie du Chien, Wisconsin and from Prairie du Chien to La Crosse were the fastest in the world, and in 1964 the Morning Zephyr had the fastest station-to-station time in the United States between Aurora and Rochelle, Illinois. All three runs were made at over 80 miles (130 km) per hour from start to station stop. By 1964 the timing from Chicago to Saint Paul had relaxed by five to ten minutes, but by 1970, the last full year of service, the journey took seven hours.

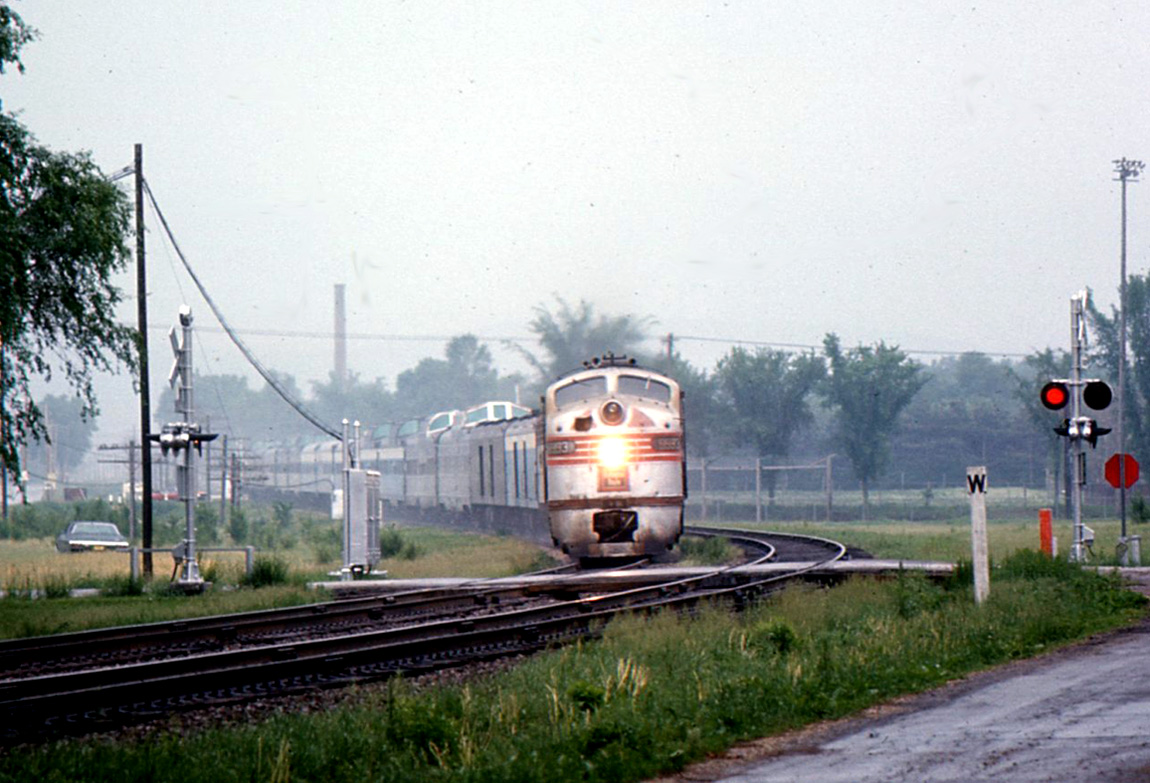
Burlington Zephyr during its last full year of service, 1970

The Burlington handled five passenger trains each way between Chicago and the Twin Cities, four of them in the daytime: the morning and afternoon Zephyrs and the premier trains of the Burlington's two owners, the North Coast Limited of the Northern Pacific Railroad and the Empire Builder of the Great Northern Railway, both of which ran to the West Coast. The nighttime train was the Black Hawk. Although the railroad's passenger service as a whole carried more passengers in 1964 than in 1949, by 1964 all four daytime Zephyrs along the Mississippi operated at a loss. To save money, trains were often consolidated in off-peak times starting in 1960, and eventually the four daytime trains were reduced to two, with the Afternoon Zephyr taking the Empire Builder and North Coast Limited to the Twin Cities, and the Morning Zephyr taking the two trains to Chicago.

The Twin Zephyr ran for 36 years until 1971 when Amtrak took over most intercity passenger trains in the United States.

== Equipment ==
The first pair of three-car Twin Zephyr trainsets were very similar to the original Pioneer Zephyr, and were articulated trains riding on four trucks. This pair, delivered in April 1935, quickly proved too small to cope with passenger loads, and a second pair of six-car trains (soon expanded to seven cars) was delivered in November 1936. These trainsets also were articulated. One train was called "The Train of the Goddesses" and the cars were named Ceres, Diana, Juno, Minerva, Psyche, Venus, and Vesta. The other trainset was known as "The Train of the Gods" and the cars were named for mythological figures Apollo, Cupid, Jupiter, Mars, Mercury, Neptune, and Vulcan. Motive power for the second pair of trains was originally shovelnose diesel locomotives 9904 (Pegasus) and 9905 (Zephyrus).

On its way into Chicago on the evening of April 3, 1947, the "Train of the Goddesses" travelling at 75 miles (121 km) per hour was derailed in Downers Grove, Illinois by a tractor that fell into its path from a freight train on a parallel track. Two of the Zephyr's cars smashed into an unoccupied brick railroad station. Many people were injured in the derailment and two passengers and the engineer lost their lives.

After a third pair of trains were delivered in 1947, the second pair of trains was reassigned as the Nebraska Zephyrs. The third sets (typically seven cars) were the first dome streamliner trains, after a company-built modified coach dome car was tested starting in 1945. The 1947 sets originally consisted of a baggage-refreshment car, four vista dome coaches, a dining car and a dome parlor observation car. They served as a prototype of the 1949 California Zephyr which had sleeping cars in addition.

In 1977 the "Train of the Gods" was refurbished and delivered to Saudi Arabia for use on the Dammam–Riyadh line.

== Route ==
The Twin Zephyr ran on the Burlington Route from Chicago to St. Paul. Today these lines belong to the BNSF Railway as subdivisions of the BNSF Northern Transcon:

- Chicago Subdivision - Chicago, Illinois to Aurora, Illinois
- Aurora Subdivision - Aurora to La Crosse, Wisconsin
- St. Croix Subdivision - La Crosse to St. Croix Junction, Minnesota
- St. Paul Subdivision - St. Croix Junction to St. Paul and Minneapolis, Minnesota

The Morning and Afternoon Zephyr trains were limited stop runs. Because some stations were not in central downtown areas, connecting "Burlington Bus" service was provided at East Dubuque, Illinois, for Dubuque, Iowa; North La Crosse for La Crosse, Wisconsin, and Winona Junction, Wisconsin, for Winona, Minnesota. In 1947, the Morning and Afternoon Zephyrs left Chicago at 9:00 a.m. and 4:00 p.m., respectively. The times varied during the season, with the Morning Zephyr leaving at 8:00 a.m. and the Afternoon Zephyr at 4:30 p.m. from Chicago during the summer, with a 2:30 afternoon departure in the non-summer months.
