= Ak-Sar-Ben Zephyr =

Passenger train operated by the CB&Q Railroad

Overview
- Service type: Inter-city rail
- Status: Discontinued
- Locale: Midwestern United States
- First service: December 11, 1940
- Last service: August 1970
- Former operators: Chicago, Burlington and Quincy Railroad; Burlington Northern Railroad

Route
- Termini: Chicago, Illinois; Lincoln, Nebraska
- Distance travelled: 551 miles (887 km)
- Service frequency: Daily
- Train number: 3/4

The Ak-Sar-Ben Zephyr was a streamlined passenger train operated by the Chicago, Burlington and Quincy Railroad (CB&Q) between Lincoln, Nebraska and Chicago, Illinois, United States. The first version operated from 1940 to 1947; a revived service operated from 1953 to 1970. The "Ak-Sar-Ben" portion of name was created by spelling Nebraska (Neb-ras-ka) backwards and taken from a fraternal organization of the same name. "Zephyr" was a name applied by the CB&Q to many of its trains, beginning with the Pioneer Zephyr in 1934. The name derived from "Zephyrus", the Greek god of the west wind.

== History ==
The first Ak-Sar-Ben Zephyr was an eastbound-only daylight service between Lincoln, Nebraska and Chicago. The 551-mile (887 km) journey took nine hours. The train's consist included new lightweight equipment and traditional heavyweight cars. The "Ak-Sar-Ben" portion of name was created by spelling Nebraska (Neb-ras-ka) backwards; a fraternal organization (the Knights of Ak-Sar-Ben) and an arena and horse racing facility in Omaha have also used the name. The Advance Flyer provided westward service. The new service began on December 11, 1940. The CB&Q ended this service in 1947, replacing it with the new Nebraska Zephyr.

The second Ak-Sar-Ben Zephyr was an overnight service between Chicago and Lincoln which used a mixture of 1940s equipment and new cars which it pooled with the California Zephyr, including a "Vista-Dome" dome car. Although gradually downgraded during the 1960s the train survived into the Burlington Northern era before being discontinued in August 1970.

== Route ==
The westbound, as of April 26, 1964, was:

- Chicago, Illinois – departed at 10:00 p.m.
- La Grange, Illinois
- Aurora, Illinois
- Mendota, Illinois
- Kewanee, Illinois
- Galesburg, Illinois
- Monmouth, Illinois (Flag Stop)
- Burlington, Iowa
- Mount Pleasant, Iowa
- Fairfield, Iowa
- Ottumwa, Iowa
- Albia, Iowa
- Chariton, Iowa
- Osceola, Iowa
- Creston, Iowa
- Corning, Iowa (Flag Stop)
- Villisca, Iowa (Flag Stop)
- Red Oak, Iowa
- Council Bluffs, Iowa
- Omaha, Nebraska
- Lincoln, Nebraska – arrived at 9:15 a.m.

The eastbound train departed Lincoln at 9:00 p.m., arriving at Chicago Union Station the following morning at 7:50 a.m.

== Equipment ==
In 1938–1940 the Budd Company constructed a fleet of lightweight cars for the CB&Q for use on various routes. This fleet included baggage cars, dining cars (48 seats), dining-parlor-observation cars, and coaches. Each of these carried a name starting with "Silver", as had become the custom with the CB&Q's Zephyrs. The lightweight equipment for the 1940 Ak-Sar-Ben Zephyr came from this pool.

The 1953 Ak-Sar-Ben Zephyr used both pre-World War II coaches and new equipment manufactured in 1952 for the California Zephyr. The coaches were part of the pool used for the 1940 iteration, among other trains. The westbound Ak-Sar-Ben would use the following cars off the arriving eastbound California Zephyr:

- 48-seat dining car
- 10-roomette 6-double bedroom sleeping car
- 10-roomette 6-double bedroom sleeping car
- 16-section sleeping car
- 1-drawing room 3-double bedroom Vista-Dome dome-buffet-lounge-observation car

The cars off the eastbound Ak-Sar-Ben Zephyr would in turn be used by that day's westbound California Zephyr.
