= Illinois Central 121 =

North American trainset

Green Diamond
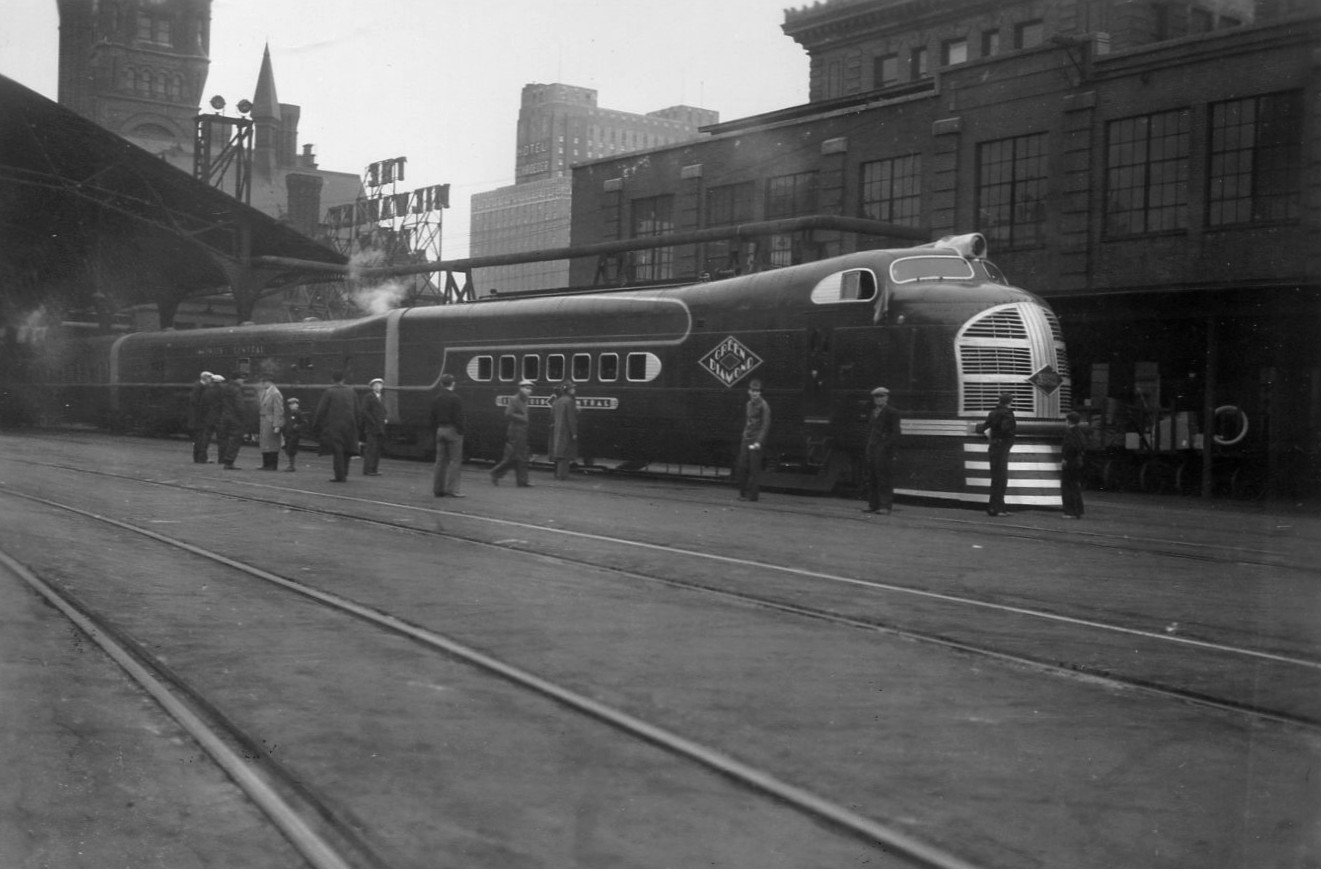
- The Green Diamond in Milwaukee, Wisconsin, at the Milwaukee Road depot April 24, 1936.
Type and origin
- Power type: Diesel-electric
- Builder: Pullman-Standard
- Build date: 1936
Specifications
- Gauge: 4 ft 8 1/2 in (1,435 mm) standard gauge
- Fuel type: Diesel
- Fuel capacity: 725 US gal (604 imp gal; 2,740 L)
- Prime mover: Winton 201-A
- Engine type: V16 Diesel
- Cylinders: 16
Performance figures
- Power output: 1,200 hp (890 kW)
Career
- Operators: Illinois Central Railroad
- Official name: IC 121
- Nicknames: Tobacco Worm
- Locale: North America
- Last run: February 28, 1947
- Retired: August 8, 1950
- Disposition: Scrapped

Illinois Central 121 (IC #121) was a diesel streamliner built in 1936 by Pullman-Standard and powered by Electro-Motive Corporation, which was used by the Illinois Central Railroad on the Green Diamond. Its fixed five-car consist was also the end of an era; the popularity of the early streamliners was their undoing, because the trains could not be lengthened or shortened to handle varying loads. It was the last streamliner built with the power car articulated with the train; future streamliners featured a matched but separable locomotive. The train was painted in a two-tone green livery, "Cypress Green" on the nose and below the window sills with "Cedar Green" above, separated by an aluminum strip. Extensive aluminum trim was applied.

== Consist ==
The train's fixed consist was:

- Car 121: Power car including driving cab, 1,200 hp (890 kW) Winton 201-A 16-cylinder engine and generator, auxiliary generator, and train heating boiler. Below the floor, the first truck was powered, but the second, articulated with the second car, was not. A 725 US gal (604 imp gal; 2,740 L) fuel tank was also mounted between the trucks.
- Car 122: Storage, Baggage and Mail car of which approximately half was the mail compartment.
- Car 123: Coach including conductor's office, seating 56.
- Car 124: Coach including restrooms, seating 60.
- Car 125: Diner-Lounge-Observation including restrooms, kitchen, dining area seating 8, and observation lounge seating 20.

All passenger-carrying cars were air-conditioned, with radio communication between them. Full width rubber diaphragms joined the cars, and all cars were articulated (sharing a truck with the neighboring car).

== Operation ==
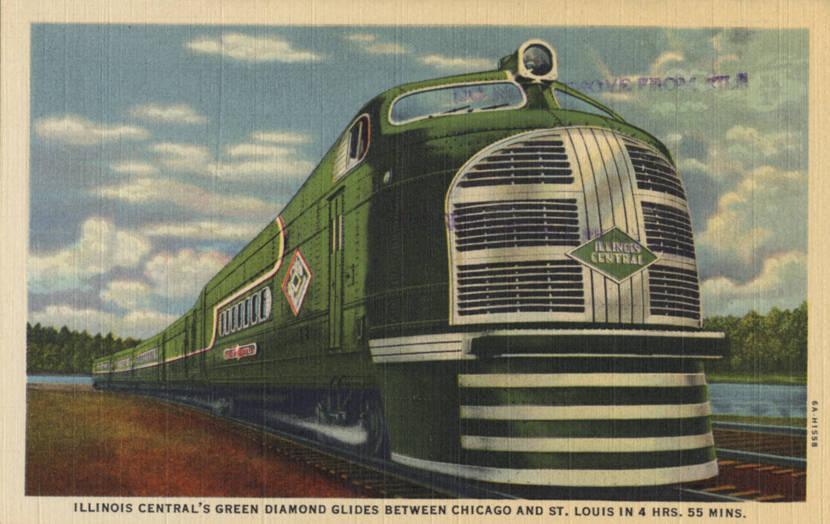
A 1936 postcard promoting the Illinois Central's streamlined Green Diamond

IC 121 operated the Green Diamond service between 1936–1947. The Green Diamond began each morning with an 8:55 AM departure as Train 50 from St. Louis Union Station, arriving at IC's Central Station in Chicago at 1:50 PM. The train was then turned and serviced, for a 5:00 PM return as Train 51, arriving back in St. Louis by 9:55 PM. Seven stops were made en route, and the train ran to a 4-hour 55 minute schedule, being by far the fastest of IC's three trains on that route. Wartime in 1943 added an extra 15 minutes to the schedule to cope with traffic congestion, but the train was otherwise unchanged.

On September 29, 1946, with the full dieselization of all Chicago-St.Louis passenger service, the Green Diamond was changed to train Nos. 20 and 21, the reservation requirement was dropped, and the timetable no longer referred to the train as a distinct trainset. Unsurprisingly, the trainset was withdrawn from service on February 28, 1947, being replaced by a new Green Diamond, an E-unit-hauled streamliner with regular lightweight cars.

The trainset was shipped to the ICRR's shops at Paducah, Kentucky, for a complete overhaul, which took two months. The train emerged still in two-tone green, but with the Green Diamond names completely removed. It re-entered service on April 27, 1947, as the Miss-Lou (MISSissippi-LOUisiana) between Jackson, Mississippi, and New Orleans, Louisiana, operating as Trains 27 and 28. It left Jackson at 6:20 AM, arriving in New Orleans at 10:20 AM; the return journey left at 6:20 PM and arrived in Jackson at 10:20 PM.

The trainset was finally retired on August 8, 1950, and sold for scrap.

== See also ==
- Passenger train service on the Illinois Central Railroad
