= Green Diamond =

Train service in the United States

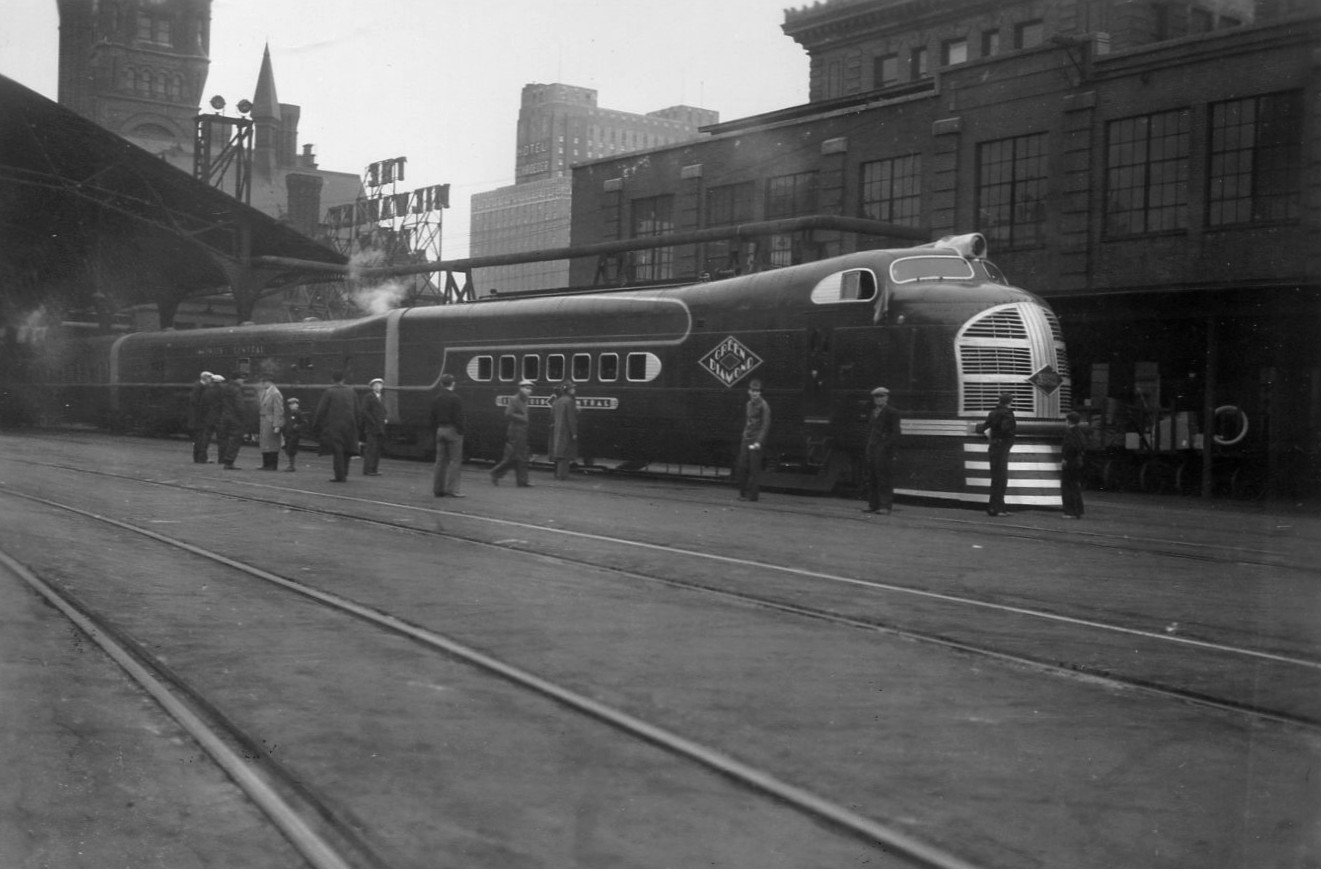
- IC #121 in Milwaukee, Wisconsin at the Milwaukee Road depot on April 24, 1936, prior to the inauguration of the Green Diamond.

Overview
- First service: May 17, 1936
- Last service: May 19, 1968
- Successor: Governor's Special
- Former operator: Illinois Central Railroad

Route
- Termini: Chicago, Illinois; St. Louis, Missouri
- Stops: 7 (Since 1938)
- Distance travelled: 294.2 miles (473.5 km)
- Average journey time: 4 hours 55 minutes
- Train numbers: 51 (Chicago - St. Louis); 50 (St. Louis - Chicago)

Technical
- Track gauge: 4 ft 8 1/2 in (1,435 mm) standard gauge
- Operating speed: 59.8 mph (96.2 km/h) (average)

The Green Diamond was a streamlined passenger train operated by the Illinois Central Railroad between Chicago, Illinois and St. Louis, Missouri. It operated from 1936 until 1968. It was the Illinois Central's first streamliner. Initially it operated with Illinois Central 121, the last of the 1930s fixed-consist articulated streamliners built in the United States.

After 1947, the Green Diamond operated with more conventional streamlined equipment until its discontinuance. The name honored the "green diamond" in the Illinois Central's logo as well as the Diamond Special, the Illinois Central's oldest train on the Chicago-St. Louis run.

== History ==
The Green Diamond first ran in regular service on May 17, 1936. It was the Illinois Central's first streamlined passenger train and proved popular with the traveling public to the point that demand outstripped the streamliner's fixed capacity.

The Green Diamond covered the 294 miles (473 km) from Chicago to St. Louis in 4 hours 55 minutes, averaging 59 miles per hour (95 km/h). The Green Diamond required a single consist to operate, departing Chicago for St. Louis in the morning and returning that same evening. The name honored the "green diamond" in the Illinois Central's logo as well as the Diamond Special, the Illinois Central's oldest train on the Chicago-St. Louis run.

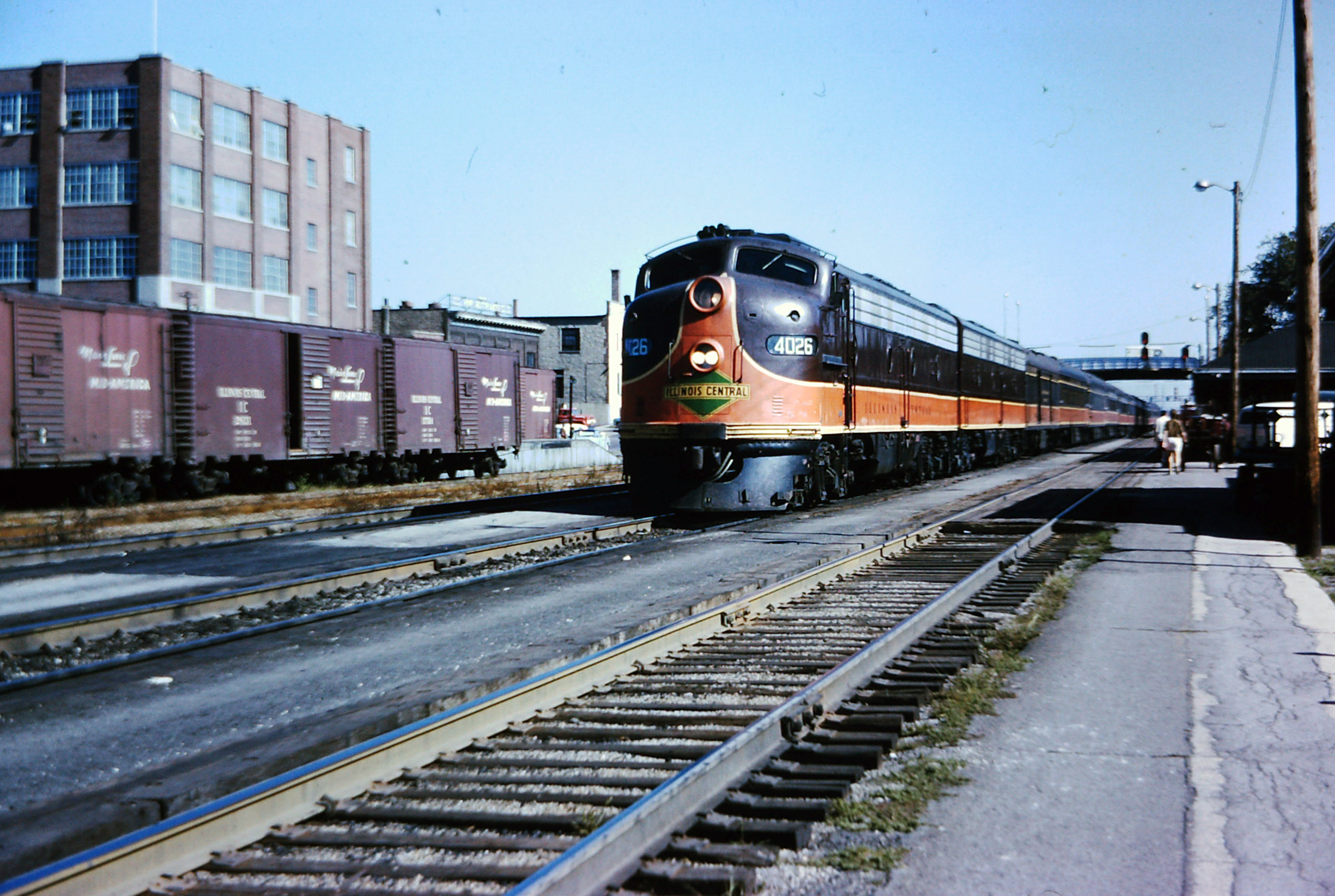
Green Diamond with conventional equipment at Kankakee in August 1964

Conventional equipment with expanded seating capacity replaced the articulated streamliner in 1947. After the discontinuance of the Daylight and Night Diamond on October 27, 1958, the Green Diamond became the Illinois Central's last train between Chicago and St. Louis and its departure from St. Louis moved up to mid-afternoon.

On May 20, 1968 the Illinois Central truncated the train's route to Springfield, Illinois and renamed it the Governor's Special, a name which, if nothing else, suited the new terminus. The Green Diamond had operated just over 32 years.

Amtrak did not continue the Governor's Special, which ended revenue service on April 30, 1971. However, Amtrak has provided Lincoln Service between Chicago and St Louis along a different route, as well as operating the Texas Eagle on a longer route since the 1980s.

== Equipment ==
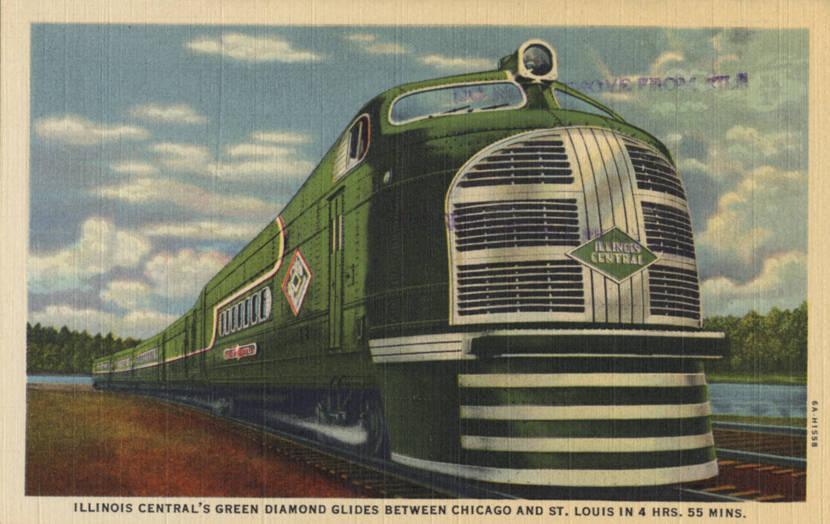
A 1936 postcard promoting the Illinois Central's streamlined Green Diamond

Pullman-Standard constructed the Green Diamond's original fixed consist, which included a power car, baggage/mail car, coach, coach-dinette, and kitchen-dinette-parlor-observation car. The cars were numbered 121-125.

The coach seated 56, while the coach-dinette seated 44 in the coach section and the dinette area had seating for 16. The parlor car had seating for 22. It was the last fixed-consist train built in the 1930s for a railroad in the United States.

The equipment was painted in a "bright two-tone green paint scheme." Motive power was provided by 1,200 hp (890 kW) EMC Winton 201-A 16-cylinder engine. A second generator within the power car provided electricity for the lights, while a separate steam generator heated the train. The train's interior was art deco, as was popular in the period.

In 1947 the Illinois Central replaced this trainset with a set of conventional cars. The four coaches came new from Pullman-Standard, while the remainder the Illinois Central rebuilt from heavyweight cars in its own shops:

- IC #2531 "Springfield" (56-seat coach)
- IC #2632 "Litchfield" (56-seat coach)
- IC #2633 "Clinton" (56-seat coach)
- IC #2636 "Kankakee" (56-seat coach)
- IC #3335 "Grant Park" (crew-tavern-coach)
- IC #4109 "Auguste Chouteau" (36-seat dining car)
- IC #3325 "Pierre Laclede" (parlor-tavern-lounge car)
- IC #3310 "Mark Beaubien" (parlor-observation car)

Additional rebuilt baggage, baggage-dormitory, and mail/express cars were added to the Green Diamond's equipment pool in 1947-1948. The original articulated consist was reassigned first to the Daylight and then the Miss Lou.

Service cutbacks in 1967 led to the removal of the parlor-observation car and the replacement of the dining car by a cafe-lounge. In June 1968, service between Springfield and St. Louis was discontinued and the remaining segment of the former Green Diamond was renamed the Governor's Special. As the Governor's Special the typical consist was a cafe/bar coach and two other coaches.
