= Nebraska Zephyr =

American passenger train (1947–1971)

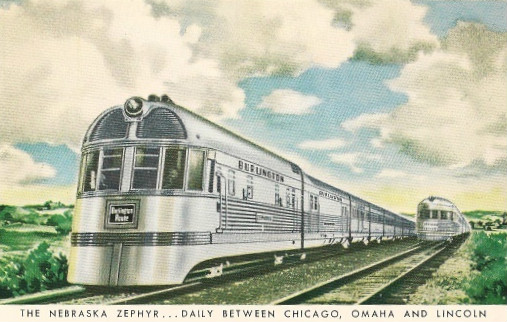
- Postcard depiction of the Nebraska Zephyr in the 1950s.

Overview
- Service type: Inter-city rail
- Status: Discontinued
- Locale: Midwestern United States
- Predecessor: Ak-Sar-Ben Zephyr
- First service: November 16, 1947
- Last service: April 30, 1971
- Former operators: Chicago, Burlington and Quincy Railroad; Burlington Northern Railroad

Route
- Termini: Chicago, Illinois; Lincoln, Nebraska
- Distance travelled: 551 miles (887 km)
- Service frequency: Daily
- Train numbers: 11 (westbound), 12 (eastbound)

On-board services
- Seating arrangements: Reclining seat coaches
- Catering facilities: Dining car
- Observation facilities: Parlor car

The Nebraska Zephyr is a streamlined passenger train operated from 1947 to 1971 by the Chicago, Burlington and Quincy Railroad (CB&Q, commonly known as the "Burlington") between Chicago, Illinois; Omaha, Nebraska; and Lincoln, Nebraska. Until 1968, the service was provided by two Twin Cities Zephyr articulated trainsets — the "Train of the Gods" and "Train of the Goddesses" — that became synonymous with it. The Nebraska Zephyr was one of many trains discontinued when Amtrak began operations in 1971. The "Train of the Goddesses" set is preserved at the Illinois Railway Museum in Union, Illinois.

== History ==
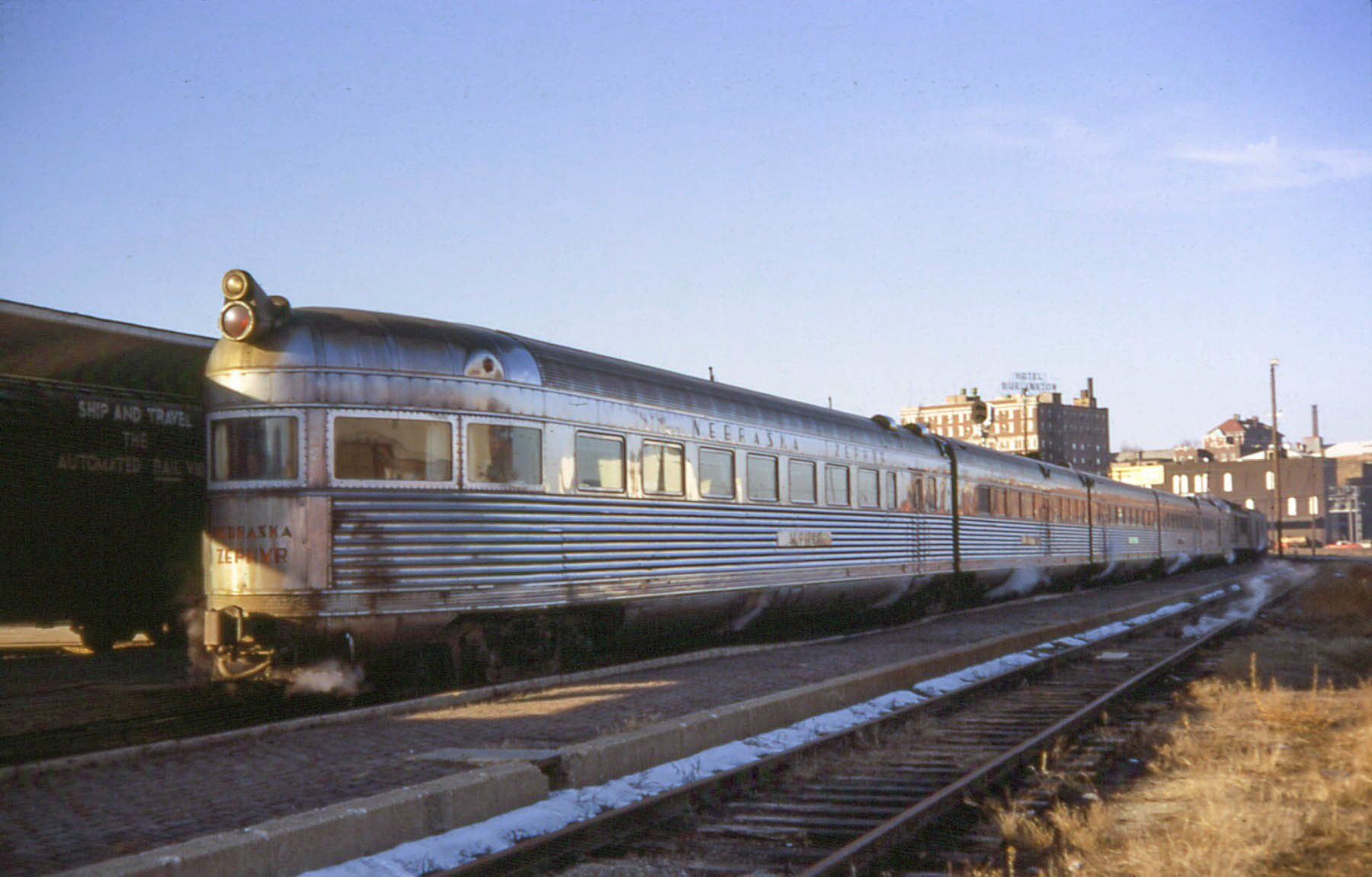
Nebraska Zephyr at Burlington, IA, 1968

The Burlington introduced the Nebraska Zephyr on the Chicago–Omaha–Lincoln route on November 16, 1947, replacing the Ak-Sar-Ben Zephyr. The Zephyr joined four other trains on the route: the Exposition Flyer, Denver Zephyr, Ak-Sar-Ben, and Fast Mail. On-board services included a parlor car, dining car, and cocktail lounge. The trains operated on a daylight schedule between Chicago and Lincoln. Westbound #11 left Chicago at 12:45 p.m. and arrived in Lincoln at 10:30 p.m. Eastbound #12 departed Lincoln at 11 a.m. and arrived in Chicago at 8:45 p.m. The 551-mile (887 km) trip took 9 hours 45 minutes, an average speed of 56 miles per hour (90 km/h).

The Burlington removed the distinctive "Zephyr" trainsets in February 1968, but continued to run the train as the Nebraska Zephyr, albeit with reduced service. A June 1968 timetable advertised a "dinette coach" as the only amenity, and the running time had lengthened to 11 hours 30 minutes. The Nebraska Zephyr lost its name before its discontinuance on April 30, 1971.

== Equipment ==
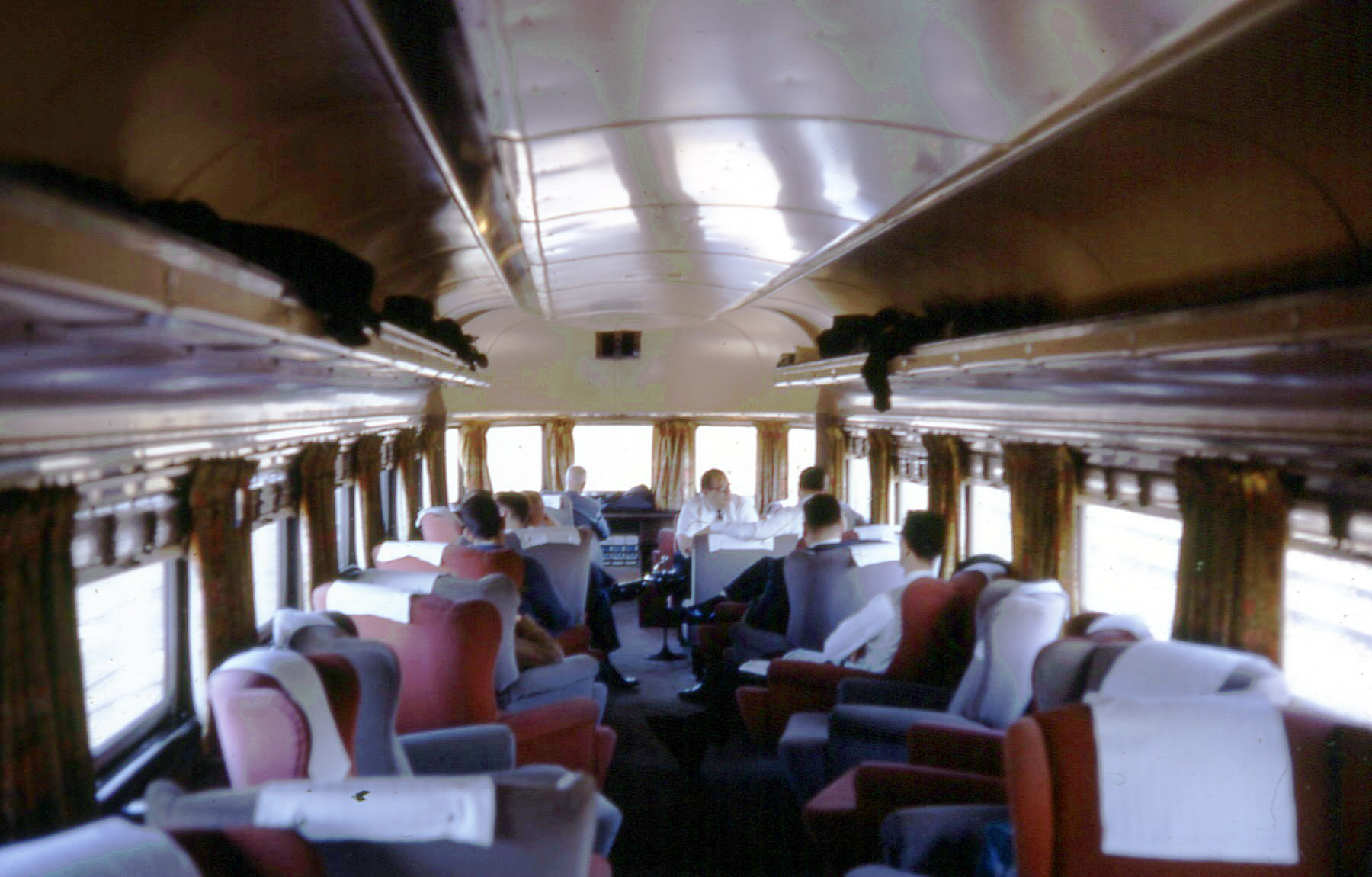
The interior of the observation car Jupiter in January 1968, just before its retirement

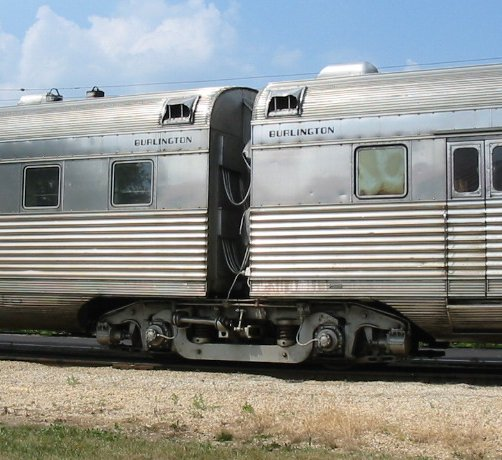
A closeup of the articulation used between passenger cars on the Nebraska Zephyr trainset

The twin Nebraska Zephyr trainsets were built in 1936 by the Budd Company as the second pair of Twin Zephyrs, built for service between Chicago and Minneapolis-St. Paul, both of which had cars named for classical deities. One trainset was known as the "Train of the Goddesses" and its cars were named Venus, Vesta, Minerva, Psyche, Ceres, Diana, and Juno. The other trainset was known as the "Train of the Gods" and its cars were named Apollo, Mars, Neptune, Cupid, Vulcan, Mercury, and Jupiter. Each consist included the following cars: cocktail lounge, two 60-seat coaches, a coach-dinette, dining car, a parlor car, and a parlor-observation car. Early typical motive power for these trains was provided by a pair of shovel-nose diesels named Pegasus (CB&Q #9904) and Zephyrus (CB&Q 9905).

In their original configuration, the two parlor cars, Diana and Mercury, had 19 seats and a private drawing room. In 1942, before the sets entered service as the Nebraska Zephyr, the railroad replaced the parlor seats with 42 standard seats. The Burlington added two new baggage cars, the Argo and Olympus, to the trains in February 1948.

The 1960s brought several changes to cut costs. In 1963, the Burlington replaced the cocktail lounges in the Venus and Apollo, with 42 coach seats apiece. In 1966, the dining cars Ceres and Vulcan were rebuilt as "cafeteria cars" with vending machines. The Burlington withdrew the trainsets from service in February 1968, and began using other cars for the Nebraska Zephyr.

The "Train of the Goddesses" arrived at the Illinois Railway Museum on September 21, 1968; it is still operated on short runs on the museum's substantial trackage, providing train enthusiasts and tourists with an experience reminiscent of the heyday of the Burlington's Zephyr service. In 1977, Burlington refurbished the "Train of the Gods" and sold it to Saudi Arabia for use on the Dammam–Riyadh line of the Saudi Railways Organization, where it operated into the 21st century.

== Gallery ==
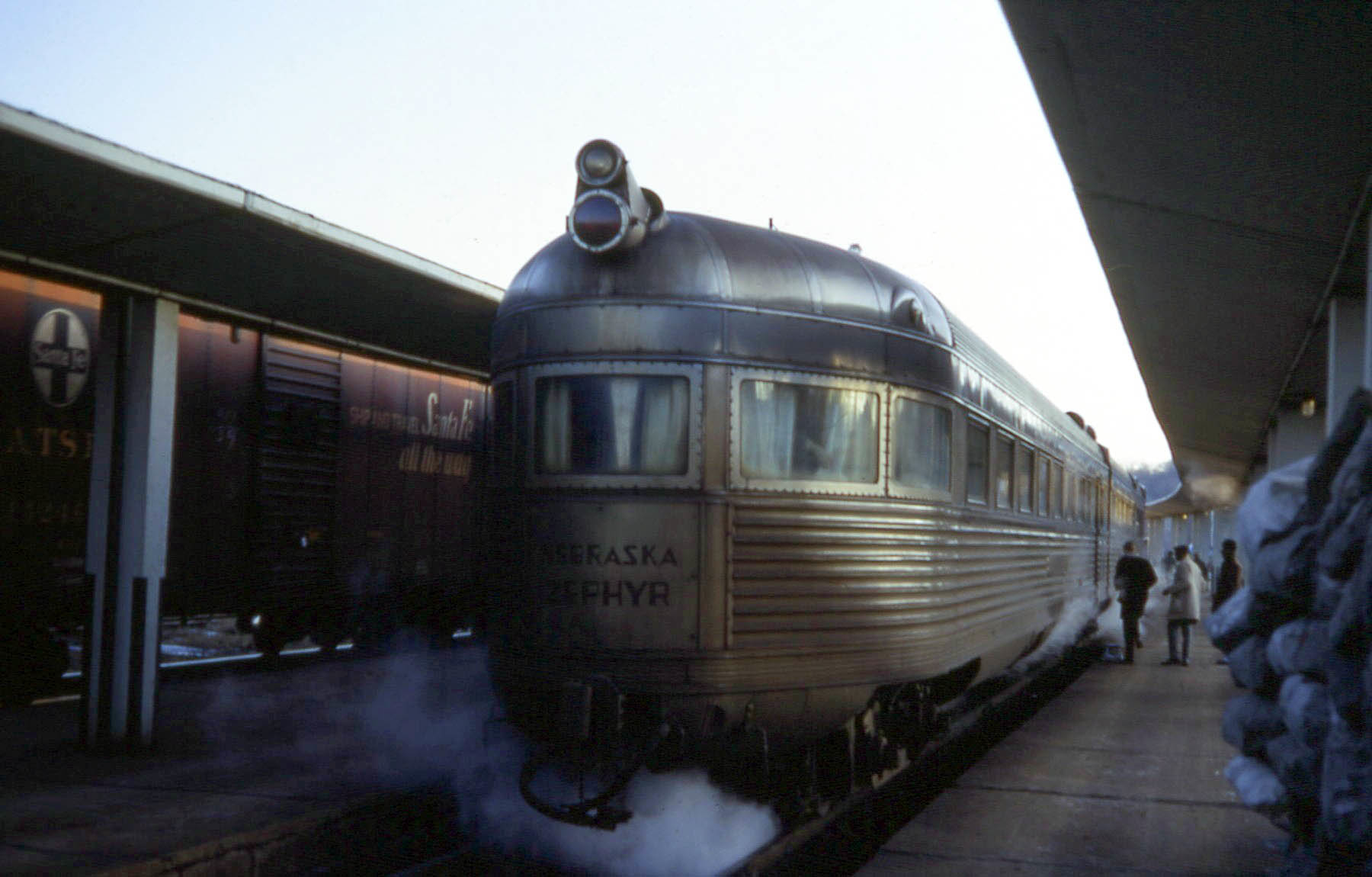
Nebraska Zephyr, 1968

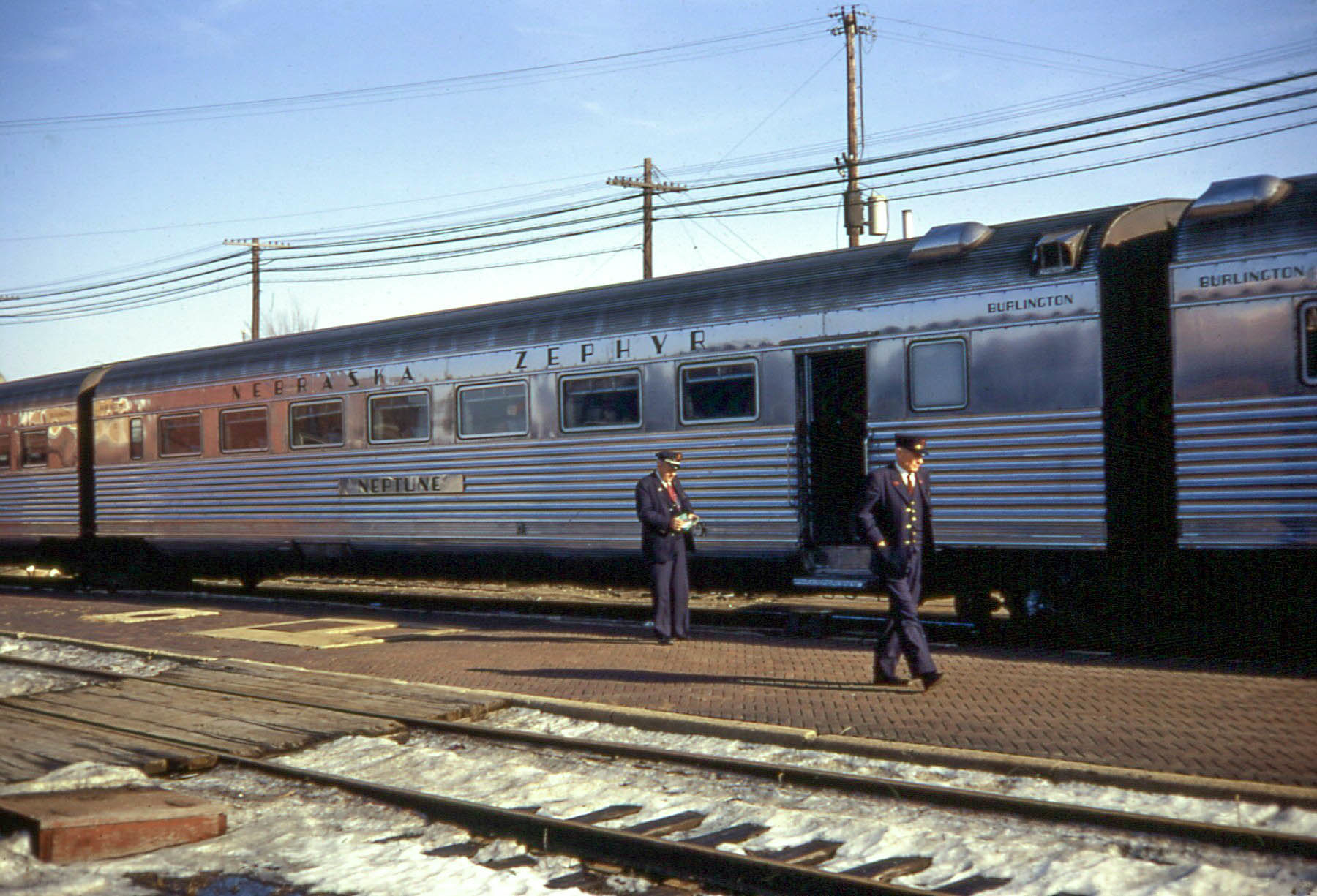
Zephyr coaches at Galesburg, 1968

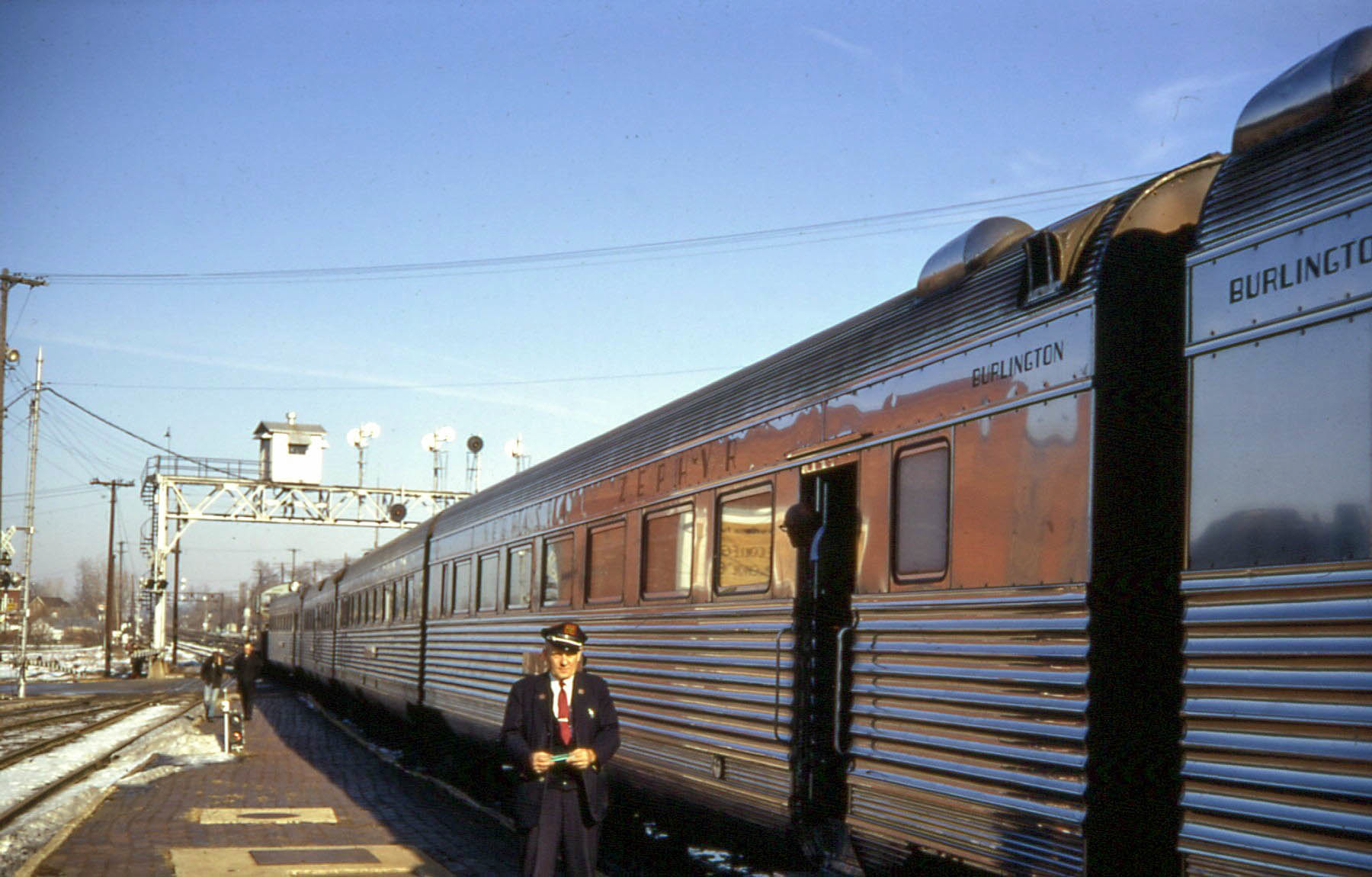
Zephyr coaches at Galesburg, 1968

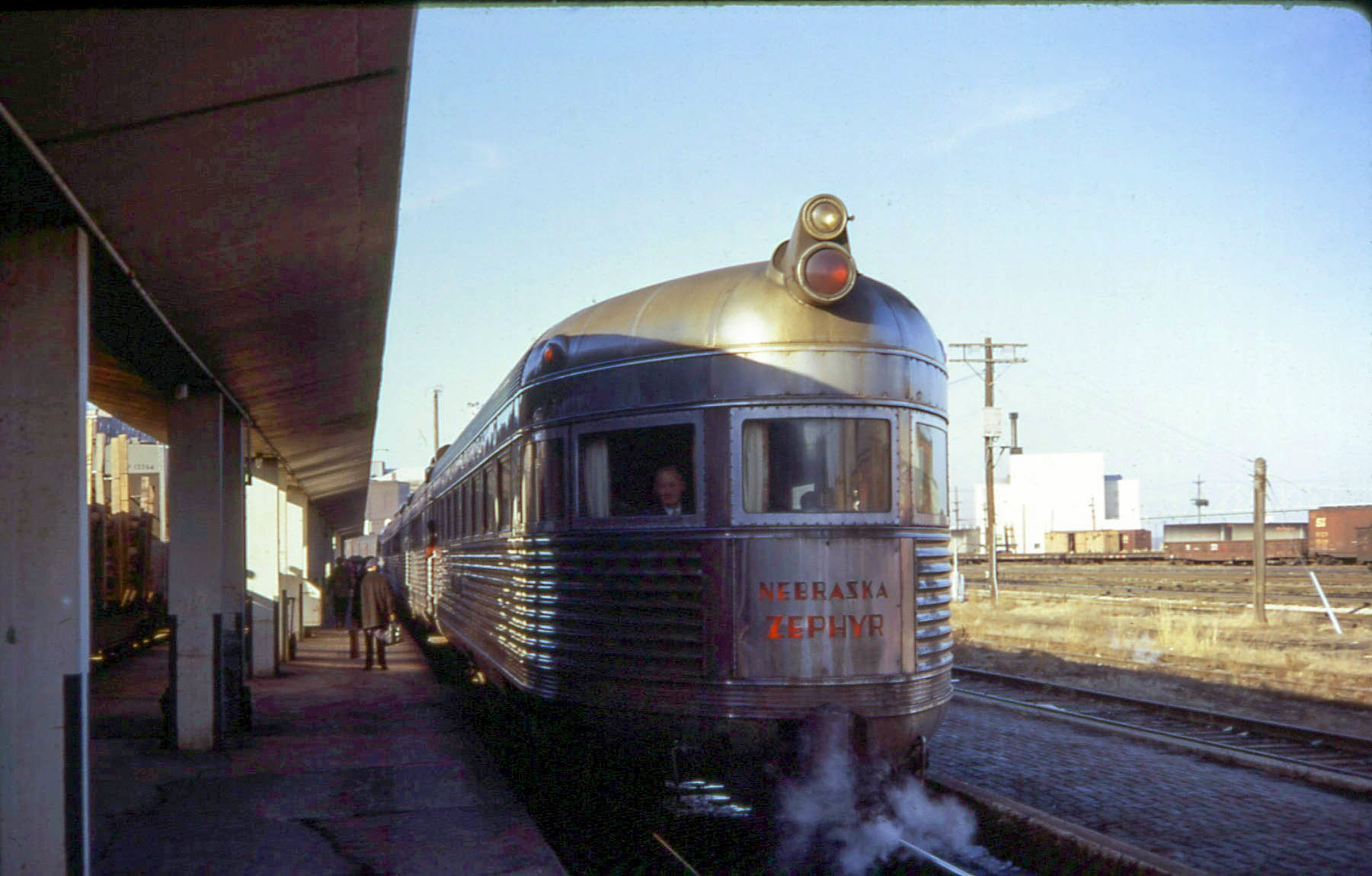
Zephyr observation car at Burlington, IA, 1968

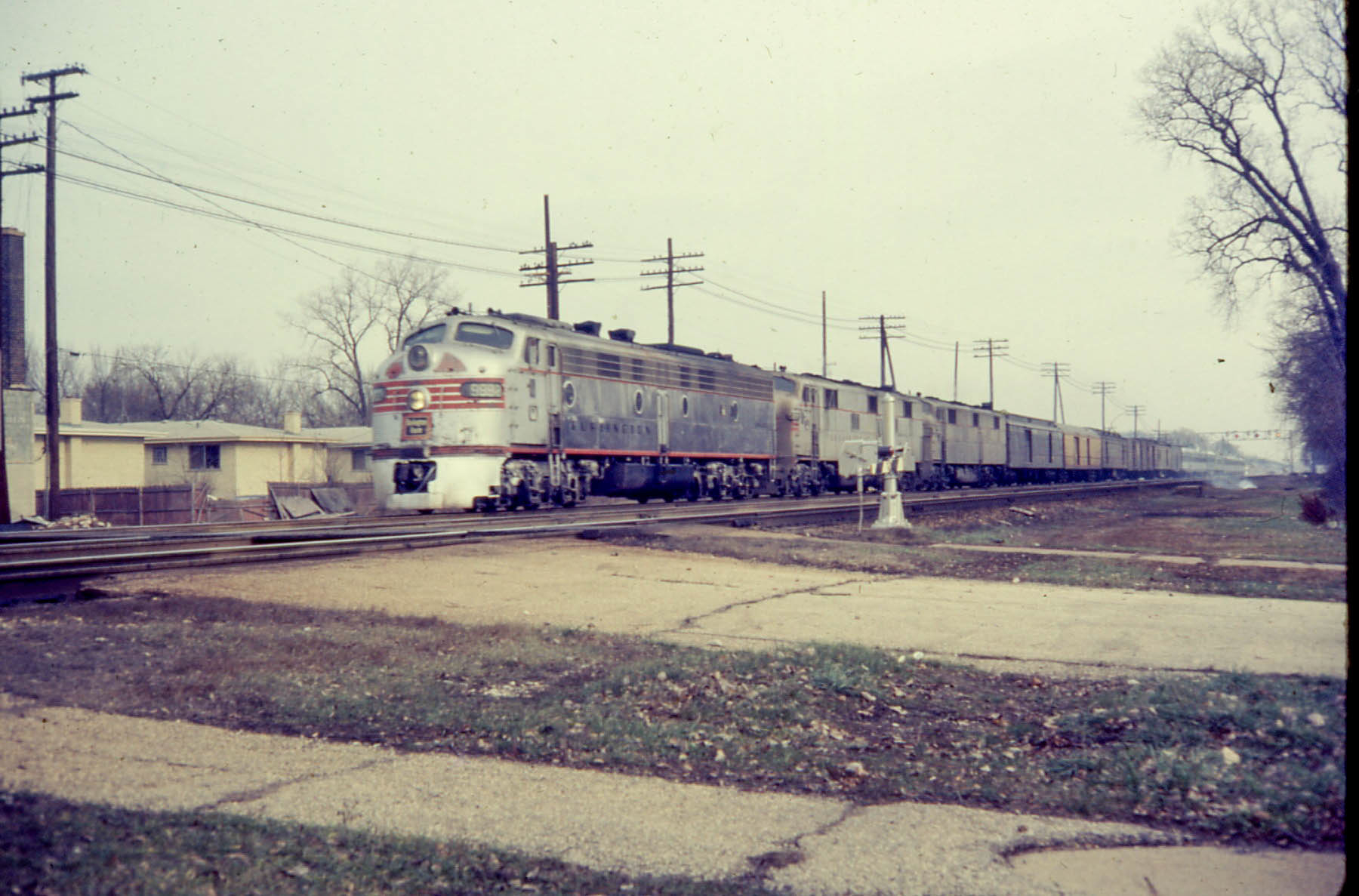
1967, CB&Q Nebraska Zephyr & Kansas City Zephyr at Riverside, IL

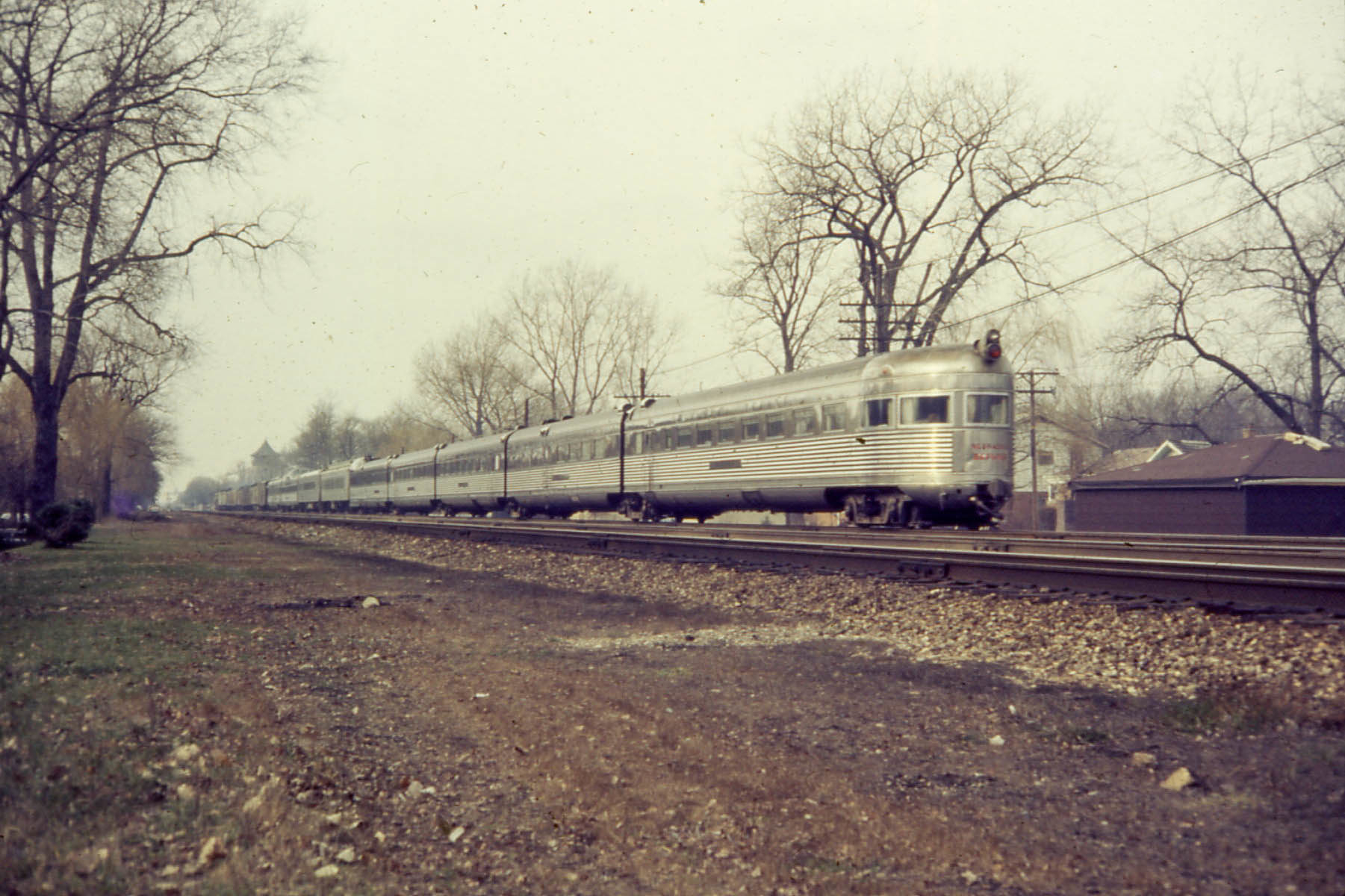
1967, CB&Q Nebraska Zephyr & Kansas City Zephyr at Riverside, IL
