= List of preserved locomotives in Canada =

This is a list of preserved locomotives in Canada. It is intended to list all locomotives that are preserved, displayed, stored or operated at museums or heritage railways. This does not include self-propelled railcars, multiple units or locomotives of miniature railways.

== Locomotives ==
The permanent or usual locations are identified by coordinates where possible; these locations may be seen together by clicking on "Map all coordinates using: OpenStreetMap" at the right side of this page.

| Locomotive | Image | Type | Built | Location | Notes |
|---|---|---|---|---|---|
| AMT 1311 | | GP9RM | 1959 | Canadian Railway Museum, Saint-Constant, Quebec | Built as 4307 for Canadian National. |
| BC Rail 6001 | | GF6C | 1983 | Central BC Railway and Forestry Museum, Prince George, British Columbia | |
| Canadian National 40 | | 4-4-0 | 1872 | Canada Science and Technology Museum, Ottawa, Ontario | |
| Canadian National 46 | | 4-6-4T Class X-10-a | 1914 | Vallée-Jonction, Quebec | One of three preserved Canadian National 4-6-4T locomotives, along with CN 49 and CN 47. |
| Canadian National 49 | | 4-6-4T Class X-10-a | 1914 | Canadian Railway Museum, Saint-Constant, Quebec | One of three preserved Canadian National 4-6-4T locomotives, along with CN 46 and CN 47. |
| Canadian National 77 | | Boxcab | 1929 | Canadian Railway Museum, Saint-Constant, Quebec | Oldest preserved Canadian National diesel locomotive. |
| Canadian National 81 | | 2-6-0 Class E-10-a | 1910 | Palmerston Railway Heritage Museum, Palmerston, Ontario | |
| Canadian National 86 | | 2-6-0 Class E-10-a | 1910 | Queens Park, London, Ontario | |
| Canadian National 247 | | 0-6-0ST | 1894 | Canada Science and Technology Museum, Ottawa, Ontario | |
| Canadian National 593 | | 4-6-2 Class J-8-a | 1921 | Railway Society of Newfoundland Museum, Corner Brook, Newfoundland and Labrador | |
| Canadian National 803 | | G8 | 1956 | Carbonear Railway Museum, Carbonear, Newfoundland and Labrador | |
| Canadian National 805 | | G8 | 1956 | Canadian Railway Museum, Saint-Constant, Quebec | |
| Canadian National 900 | | NF110 | 1952 | Clarenville Heritage Museum, Clarenville, Newfoundland and Labrador | |
| Canadian National 902 | | NF110 | 1952 | Lewisporte Train Park, Loon Bay, Newfoundland and Labrador | |
| Canadian National 906 | | NF110 | 1953 | Railway Coastal Museum, St. John's, Newfoundland and Labrador | |
| Canadian National 924 | | NF210 | 1956 | Bishop's Falls Museum, Bishop's Falls, Newfoundland and Labrador | |
| Canadian National 925 | | NF210 | 1956 | Avondale Railway Museum, Avondale, Newfoundland and Labrador | |
| Canadian National 931 | | NF210 | 1956 | Railway of Society of Newfoundland, Corner Brook, Newfoundland and Labrador | |
| Canadian National 932 | | NF210 | 1956 | Bonavista, Newfoundland and Labrador | |
| Canadian National 934 | | NF210 | 1956 | Railway Heritage Centre, Channel-Port aux Basques, Newfoundland and Labrador | |
| Canadian National 940 | | NF210 | 1960 | Whitbourne Historic Museum, Whitbourne, Newfoundland and Labrador | |
| Canadian National 1009 | | 4-6-0 Class F-1-b | 1912 | New Brunswick Railway Museum, Hillsborough, New Brunswick | |
| Canadian National 1112 | | 4-6-0 Class G-16-a | 1912 | Smiths Falls Railway Museum, Smiths Falls, Ontario | |
| Canadian National 1158 | | 4-6-0 Class G-16-a | 1913 | Western Development Museum, North Battleford, Saskatchewan | |
| Canadian National 1274 | | 4-6-0 Class H-4-b | 1905 | Middleton Railway Museum, Middleton, Nova Scotia | |
| Canadian National 1382 | | SW1200 | 1950 | Canadian Railway Museum, Saint-Constant, Quebec | |
| Canadian National 1392 | | 4-6-0 Class H-6-g | 1913 | Alberta Railway Museum, Edmonton, Alberta | |
| Canadian National 1520 | | 4-6-0 Class H-4-a | 1906 | Central BC Railway and Forestry Museum, Prince George, British Columbia | |
| Canadian National 1531 | | 4-6-0 Class H-6-c | 1910 | Simcoe County Museum, Midhurst, Ontario | |
| Canadian National 1754 | | RS-18 | 1959 | New Brunswick Railway Museum, Hillsborough, New Brunswick | |
| Canadian National 1762 | | RSC-14 | 1960 | Confederation Trail, Kensington, Prince Edward Island | |
| Canadian National 1900 | | GMD1 | 1958 | Winnipeg Railway Museum, Winnipeg, Manitoba | |
| Canadian National 2141 | | 2-8-0 Class M-3-d | 1912 | Kamloops Heritage Railway, Kamloops, British Columbia | |
| Canadian National 2534 | | 2-8-0 Class N-4-a | 1906 | Uxbridge, Ontario | |
| Canadian National 2601 | | 2-8-0 Class N-4-a | 1907 | Canadian Railway Museum, Saint-Constant, Quebec | |
| Canadian National 2616 | | 2-8-0 Class N-4-a | 1911 | Haliburton Soccer Club, Haliburton, Ontario | |
| Canadian National 2747 | | 2-8-0 Class N-5-c | 1926 | Transcona Museum, Transcona, Manitoba | First locomotive built in western Canada, owned by Transcona Museum. |
| Canadian National 3239 | | 2-8-2 Class S-1-a | 1917 | Canadian Railway Museum, Saint-Constant, Quebec | |
| Canadian National 3684 | | RS-18 | 1958 | Canadian Railway Museum, Saint-Constant, Quebec | |
| Canadian National 4008 | | 2-10-2 Class T-1-a | 1916 | Rainy River, Ontario | |
| Canadian National 4100 | | 2-10-2 Class T-2-a | | Canadian Railway Museum, Saint-Constant, Quebec | |
| Canadian National 4803 | | GP7 | 1953 | Toronto Railway Museum, Toronto, Ontario | |
| Canadian National 5080 | | 4-6-2 Class J-4-a | 1914 | Aspen Crossing Railway, Mossleigh, Alberta | |
| Canadian National 5093 | | 4-6-2 Class J-4-c | 1918 | Casino Regina, Regina, Saskatchewan | |
| Canadian National 5107 | | 4-6-2 Class J-4-d | 1919 | Kapuskasing, Ontario | |
| Canadian National 5114 | | 4-6-2 Class J-4-d | 1919 | Regional Park Railroad Museum, Melville, Saskatchewan | |
| Canadian National 5270 | | 4-6-2 Class J-7-a | 1918 | Moncton, New Brunswick | |
| Canadian National 5550 | | 4-6-2 Class K-2-b | 1914 | Canadian Railway Museum, Saint-Constant, Quebec | |
| Canadian National 5588 | | 4-6-2 Class K-3-b | 1911 | Waterfront Park, Windsor, Ontario | |
| Canadian National 5702 | | 4-6-4 Class K-5-a | 1930 | Canadian Railway Museum, Saint-Constant, Quebec | |
| Canadian National 5703 | | 4-6-4 Class K-5-a | 1930 | Elgin County Railway Museum, St. Thomas, Ontario | |
| Canadian National 6015 | | 4-8-2 Class U-1-a | 1923 | Canadian National Depot, Jasper, Alberta | |
| Canadian National 6043 | | 4-8-2 Class U-1-d | 1929 | Assiniboine Park, Winnipeg, Manitoba | |
| Canadian National 6060 | | 4-8-2 Class U-1-f | 1944 | Alberta Prairie Steam Tours, Stettler, Alberta | |
| Canadian National 6069 | | 4-8-2 Class U-1-f | 1944 | Centennial Park, Sarnia, Ontario | |
| Canadian National 6077 | | 4-8-2 Class U-1-f | 1944 | Northern Ontario Railway Museum, Capreol, Ontario | |
| Canadian National 6153 | | 4-8-4 Class U-2-c | 1929 | Canadian Railway Museum, Saint-Constant, Quebec | |
| Canadian National 6167 | | 4-8-4 Class U-2-e | 1940 | John Galt Park, Guelph, Ontario | |
| Canadian National 6200 | | 4-8-4 Class U-2-g | 1942 | Canada Science and Technology Museum, Ottawa, Ontario | |
| Canadian National 6213 | | 4-8-4 Class U-2-g | 1942 | Toronto Railway Museum, Toronto, Ontario | |
| Canadian National 6218 | | 4-8-4 Class U-2-g | 1942 | Fort Erie Railroad Museum, Fort Erie, Ontario | |
| Canadian National 6400 | | 4-8-4 Class U-4-a | 1936 | Canada Science and Technology Museum, Ottawa, Ontario | |
| Canadian National 6510 | | FP9A | 1954 | Kaministiquia River Heritage Park, Thunder Bay, Ontario | |
| Canadian National 6514 | | F9A | 1957 | Alberta Railway Museum, Edmonton, Alberta | |
| Canadian National 6520 | | FP9A | 1953 | Railway Museum of British Columbia, Squamish, British Columbia | |
| Canadian National 6614 | | F9B | 1957 | Alberta Railway Museum, Edmonton, Alberta | |
| Canadian National 6710 | | Boxcab Class Z-1-a | 1917 | Deux-Montagnes, Quebec | |
| Canadian National 6711 | | Boxcab Class Z-1-a | 1917 | Canadian Railway Museum in Delson, Quebec | |
| Canadian National 6714 | | Boxcab Class Z-1-a | 1917 | Halton County Radial Railway, Milton, Ontario | |
| Canadian National 6715 | | Boxcab Class Z-1-a | 1917 | Canada Science and Technology Museum, Ottawa, Ontario | |
| Canadian National 6765 | | FPA-4 | 1958 | Canadian Railway Museum, Saint-Constant, Quebec | |
| Canadian National 7944 | | NW2 | 1946 | Alberta Railway Museum, Edmonton, Alberta | |
| Canadian National 8245 | | S-12 | 1958 | New Brunswick Railway Museum, Hillsborough, New Brunswick | |
| Canadian National 9000 | | F3A | 1957 | Alberta Railway Museum, Edmonton, Alberta | |
| Canadian National 9161 | | F7A | | Manitoba Children's Museum, Winnipeg, Manitoba | |
| Canadian National 9169 | | F7A | | Central BC Railway and Forestry Museum, Prince George, British Columbia | |
| Canadian National 9400 | | FA-1 | 1950 | Canadian Railway Museum, Saint-Constant, Quebec | |
| Canadian Pacific 29 | | 4-4-0 Class A1e | 1877 | Canadian Pacific headquarters, Calgary, Alberta | |
| Canadian Pacific 86 | | 4-4-0 Class A2l | 1882 | Prairie Dog Central Railway, Winnipeg, Manitoba | |
| Canadian Pacific 136 | | 4-4-0 Class A2m | 1883 | South Simcoe Railway, Tottenham, Ontario | |
| Canadian Pacific 144 | | 4-4-0 Class A2q | 1886 | Canadian Railway Museum, Saint-Constant, Quebec | |
| Canadian Pacific 151 "Countess of Dufferin" | | 4-4-0 | 1872 | Winnipeg Railway Museum, Winnipeg, Manitoba | First locomotive serving prairie provinces, after barged down Red River from U.S. in 1877. |
| Canadian Pacific 374 | | 4-4-0 Class SC | 1886 | Vancouver, British Columbia | Pulled the first transcontinental passenger train into Vancouver in 1887. |
| Canadian Pacific 492 | | 4-6-0 Class D4g | | Canadian Railway Museum, Saint-Constant, Quebec | |
| Canadian Pacific 894 | | 4-6-0 Class D10g | 1911 | Doon Heritage Village, Kitchener, Ontario | |
| Canadian Pacific 926 | | 4-6-0 Class D10g | 1911 | Canada Science and Technology Museum, Ottawa, Ontario | |
| Canadian Pacific 999 | | 4-6-0 Class D10h | 1912 | Canadian Railway Museum, Saint-Constant, Quebec | |
| Canadian Pacific 1057 | | 4-6-0 Class D10h | 1912 | South Simcoe Railway, Tottenham, Ontario | |
| Canadian Pacific 1095 | | 4-6-0 Class D10h | 1913 | Confederation Park, Kingston, Ontario | |
| Canadian Pacific 1201 | | 4-6-2 Class G5a | 1944 | Canada Science and Technology Museum, Ottawa, Ontario | |
| Canadian Pacific 1238 | | 4-6-2 Class G5c | 1946 | Waterloo Central Railway, St. Jacobs, Ontario | |
| Canadian Pacific 1286 | | 4-6-2 Class G5d | 1948 | Prairie Dog Central Railway, Winnipeg, Manitoba | |
| Canadian Pacific 1409 | | FP9A | 1954 | Cranbrook History Centre, Cranbrook, British Columbia | |
| Canadian Pacific 1418 | | FP7 | | Riverside Veterans Memorial Park, Medicine Hat, Alberta | |
| Canadian Pacific 1424 | | FP7 | | Riverside Veterans Memorial Park, Medicine Hat, Alberta | |
| Canadian Pacific 1608 | | GP9 | 1956 | Canadian Railway Museum, Saint-Constant, Quebec | |
| Canadian Pacific 2231 | | 4-6-2 Class G1v | 1914 | Canadian Railway Museum, Saint-Constant, Quebec | |
| Canadian Pacific 2341 | | 4-6-2 Class G3d | 1914 | Canadian Railway Museum, Saint-Constant, Quebec | |
| Canadian Pacific 2634 | | 4-6-2 Class G2u | 1913 | Western Development Museum, Moose Jaw, Saskatchewan | |
| Canadian Pacific 2816 | | 4-6-4 Class H1b | 1930 | Calgary, Alberta | Only operating 4-6-4 "Hudson" locomotive in North America. |
| Canadian Pacific 2850 | | 4-6-4 Class H1d | 1938 | Canadian Railway Museum, Saint-Constant, Quebec | Hauled the Royal Train across Canada with King George VI and Queen Elizabeth and earned the class' nickname "Royal Hudson." |
| Canadian Pacific 2858 | | 4-6-4 Class H1d | 1938 | Canada Science and Technology Museum, Ottawa, Ontario | |
| Canadian Pacific 2860 | | 4-6-4 Class H1e | 1940 | Railway Museum of British Columbia, Squamish, British Columbia | Formerly ran excursions between North Vancouver and Squamish between 1974 and 1999. |
| Canadian Pacific 2928 | | 4-4-4 Class F1a | 1938 | Canadian Railway Museum, Saint-Constant, Quebec | |
| Canadian Pacific 3100 | | 4-8-4 Class K1a | 1928 | Canada Science and Technology Museum, Ottawa, Ontario | |
| Canadian Pacific 3101 | | 4-8-4 Class K1a | 1928 | Regina, Saskatchewan | |
| Canadian Pacific 3388 | | 2-8-0 Class M3b | 1902 | Canadian Railway Museum, Saint-Constant, Quebec | |
| Canadian Pacific 3522 | | 2-8-0 Class M4g | 1907 | Bienfait, Saskatchewan | |
| Canadian Pacific 3651 | | 2-8-0 Class N2a | 1910 | Lethbridge, Alberta | |
| Canadian Pacific 3716 | | 2-8-0 Class N2b | 1912 | Kettle Valley Steam Railway, Summerland, British Columbia | |
| Canadian Pacific 4038 | | FP7A | 1951 | Minnedosa, Manitoba | |
| Canadian Pacific 4069 | | FP7A | | Railway Museum of British Columbia, Squamish, British Columbia | |
| Canadian Pacific 4090 | | FA-2 | | Cranbrook History Centre, Cranbrook, British Columbia | |
| Canadian Pacific 4237 | | DRS-24c | | Canadian Railway Museum, Saint-Constant, Quebec | |
| Canadian Pacific 4563 | | DRF-30d | | Canadian Railway Museum, Saint-Constant, Quebec | |
| Canadian Pacific 4744 | | DRF-36d | | Canadian Railway Museum, Saint-Constant, Quebec | |
| Canadian Pacific 5000 | | GP30 | 1963 | Alberta Railway Museum, Edmonton, Alberta | |
| Canadian Pacific 5433 | | 2-8-2 Class P2b | 1943 | Chapleau, Ontario | |
| Canadian Pacific 5468 | | 2-8-2 Class P2k | 1948 | Revelstoke Railway Museum, Revelstoke, British Columbia | |
| Canadian Pacific 5500 | | SD40 | 1966 | Revelstoke Railway Museum, Revelstoke, British Columbia | |
| Canadian Pacific 5903 | | SD40-2 | | Canadian Railway Museum, Saint-Constant, Quebec | |
| Canadian Pacific 5931 | | 2-10-4 Class T1c | 1949 | Heritage Park Historical Village, Calgary, Alberta | Mistakenly numbered 5934 during original display. |
| Canadian Pacific 5935 | | 2-10-4 Class T1c | 1949 | Canadian Railway Museum, Saint-Constant, Quebec | |
| Canadian Pacific 6166 | | 0-6-0 Class U3c | 1905 | Western Development Museum, Saskatoon, Saskatchewan | |
| Canadian Pacific 6271 | | 0-6-0 Class U3e | 1912 | Canadian Railway Museum, Saint-Constant, Quebec | |
| Canadian Pacific 6275 | | 0-6-0 Class U3e | 1913 | Huron County Museum, Goderich, Ontario | |
| Canadian Pacific 6503 | | DS-6a | 1951 | Railway Museum of British Columbia, Squamish, British Columbia | |
| Canadian Pacific 6568 | | S-3 | 1957 | Saskatchewan Railway Museum | |
| Canadian Pacific 6591 | | DS-6h | 1957 | Railway Museum of Eastern Ontario | |
| Canadian Pacific 6947 | | 0-8-0 Class V4a | 1908 | Sandon Historical Site, Sandon, British Columbia | |
| Canadian Pacific 7000 | | | 1937 | Canadian Railway Museum, Saint-Constant, Quebec | |
| Canadian Pacific 7020 | | S-2 | 1944 | Toronto Railway Museum, Toronto, Ontario | |
| Canadian Pacific 7077 | | DS-10h | 1948 | Canadian Railway Museum, Saint-Constant, Quebec | |
| Canadian Pacific 8905 | | DRS-24c | 1956 | Canadian Railway Museum, Saint-Constant, Quebec | |
| Canadian Pacific 8921 | | DRS-24e | 1957 | Canadian Railway Museum, Saint-Constant, Quebec | |
| Essex Terminal 9 | | 0-6-0 S162 | 1923 | Waterloo Central Railway, St. Jacobs, Ontario | |
| Grand Trunk 713 | | 2-6-0 Class E-7-a | 1900 | Canadian Railway Museum, Saint-Constant, Quebec | |
| Grand Trunk 1008 | | 2-6-0 Class E-10-a | 1910 | Upper Canada Village, Morrisburg, Ontario | |
| Grand Trunk Western 4520 | | GP9 | 1956 | Alberta Railway Museum, Edmonton, Alberta | |
| Hillcrest Lumber Company 9 | | Climax | | BC Forest Discovery Centre, Duncan, British Columbia | |
| LB&SCR 54 "Waddon" | | 0-6-0T Class A1 | 1875 | Canadian Railway Museum, Saint-Constant, Quebec | |
| LNER 4489 Dominion of Canada | | 4-6-2LNER Class A4 | 1937 | Canadian Railway Museum, Saint-Constant, Quebec | |
| Northern Alberta 302 | | GMD1 | | Alberta Railway Museum, Edmonton, Alberta | |
| Pacific Great Eastern 2 | | 2-6-2ST | 1910 | Railway Museum of British Columbia, Squamish, British Columbia | |
| Pacific Great Eastern 561 | | RS-3 | 1951 | Railway Museum of British Columbia, Squamish, British Columbia | |
| US Army 4012 | | 0-6-0 | 1942 | Heritage Park Historical Village, Calgary, Alberta | |
| US Army 4076 | | 0-6-0 | 1944 | Heritage Park Historical Village, Calgary, Alberta | |
| St. Laurent 3569 | | M-420W | 1976 | Canadian Railway Museum, Saint-Constant, Quebec | |
| SNCF 3-030.C.841 | | 0-6-0 | 1883 | Canadian Railway Museum, Saint-Constant, Quebec | |
| Temiskaming 137 | | 2-8-0 Class M-3-e | 1913 | Cochrane Railway and Pioneer Museum, Cochrane, Ontario | |
| Temiskaming 219 | | 4-6-0 | 1907 | Northern Ontario Railway Museum, Capreol, Ontario | |
| Temiskaming 503 | | 2-8-0 | 1930 | North Bay, Ontario | |
| Temiskaming 701 | | 4-6-2 | 1921 | Englehart, Ontario | |
| VIA 6309 | | FP9ARM | 1957 | Canadian Railway Museum, Saint-Constant, Quebec | |
| VIA 6921 | | LRC | 1984 | Canadian Railway Museum, Saint-Constant, Quebec | |

== See also ==
- List of preserved locomotives in the United States
- List of locomotives
