= Bull Lake =

Bull Lake may refer to:

== Glaciers ==
- Bull Lake Glacier

== Lakes ==
In Canada

- New Brunswick
  - Bull Lake (New Brunswick)
- Ontario
  - In Algoma District
    - Bull Lake (Boon Township, Ontario)
    - Bull Lake (Varley Township)
  - Bull Lake (Frontenac County)
  - In Kenora District
    - Bull Lake (Sioux Narrows-Nestor Falls)
    - Bull Lake (Fox Creek)
  - In Sudbury District
    - Bull Lake (Sheppard Township)
    - Bull Lake (Turner Township, Ontario)
  - Bull Lake (Thunder Bay District)

See also Little Bull Lake (Algoma District); Little Bull Lake (Sudbury District).
N.B. Source for Ontario Lakes: Search on Atlas of Canada on 2009-12-26

In the United States

- Wyoming
  - within the Wind River Indian Reservation
    - Bull Lake (Wyoming)

== Settlements ==
- Bull Lake, New Brunswick, Canada
- Bull Lake, Montana, United States

== See also ==
- Bull Lake glaciation
