= List of reporting marks: V =

Note: Marks ending in U are for container owners; marks ending in X are not common carriers; marks ending in Z are for trailers without flanged wheels. All other marks are of common-carrier railroads.

== V ==
- VAEX - Vale Railway (Vale Canada Limited)
- VALE - Valley Railroad (Connecticut)
- VALX - Sierra Pacific Power Company; Idaho Power Company
- VAPX - Dominion Energy (formerly Virginia Power)
- VC - Virginia Central Railway
- VCSX - Virginia Chemicals, Inc.
- VCTX - Venture Chemical Company
- VCY - Ventura County Railway
- VE - Visalia Electric Railroad
- VENX - GE Rail Services
- VGN - Virginian Railway; Norfolk Southern
- VGNX - Eastern Virginia railway historical society
- VGPX - Valley Grain Products
- VIA - Via Rail
- VIAX - VIAX, Inc.
- VICX - Vista Chemical Company
- VLIX - Vintage Locomotive, Inc.
- VMCX - The Commonwealth Plan, Inc.
- VMEX - Vernor Materials Equipment Company
- VMMX - Vulcan Materials Company (Metals Division)
- VMSX - VALERO MARKETING & SUPPLY CO.
- VMV - VMV Enterprises
- VOLX - GE Rail Services
- VOTX - Volunteer Trailblazers, Inc.
- VR - Valdosta Railway
- VREX - Virginia Railway Express
- VRRC - Vandalia Railroad
- VSC - Vitebsk Seaway and Continental Railway, Lincoln Pacific Railway
- VS - Valley and Siletz Railroad
- VSO - Valdosta Southern Railroad
- VSOR - Vicksburg Southern Railroad (Watco)
- VSX - Virginia Smelting Co.
- VT - Virginia and Truckee Railroad
- VTR - Vermont Railway
- VUHX - Wagner Mills, Inc.
- VULX - Vulcan Materials Company (Southeast Division)
- VWCX - Vernon Warehouse Company
