= School car =

In the Northern Ontario bush, many families lived too far from communities to allow their children to attend school. As a way of providing education to these children of railroad workers, trappers, natives and other people of the bush the Canadian government instituted the school car system (in French: Des écoles sur rails).

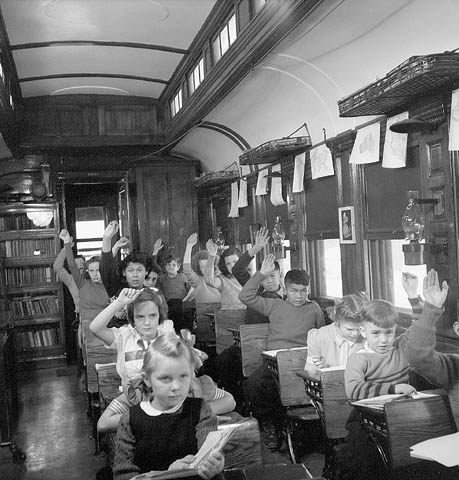
1950 Canadian School Train. Pupils attend classes at Nemegos near Chapleau, Ontario.

At its peak, in the 1940s, as many as seven school trains travelled on the tracks of Northern Ontario. The school cars or "school on wheels" ran from 1926 to 1967, and stopped at each site on their route for three to five days out of a month.

== Museum ==
One of the cars used as a classroom is currently a railcar museum in Clinton.

== List of Teachers ==
The number of cars was increased from 2 to 7, with the teacher and sometimes his wife and family.

Teacher	Railroad	Area	Year Began	Length of Service	Notes
Fred Sloman, wife Cela, and children	Canadian National Railways (CNR)	Capreol West	1926	39+ years	Car #15029, Ville Marie
Walter McNally	Canadian Pacific Railway (CP)	Chapleau East	1926	13 years	Car #15019, Stadacona
William Wright	CP	Chapleau West	1928	40 years	
William Fleming	CNR	Port Arthur North Branch	1928	approx 18 Years	
Andrew Clement	CNR	Port Arthur West, Sioux Lookout West, North Bay North	1930	28 years	
Angus and Helen McKay	CNR	Sioux Lookout West, North Bay North	1934	12 years	
Henry Antoniak	CNR	Sioux Lookout West, Port Arthur West	1938	Approx 10 years	
Cameron Bell	CP	Chapleau East	1944	4 years	
James Chalmers	CNR	Port Arthur West	1946	16 years	
Philip Fraser	CNR	Sioux Lookout West	1946	19 years	
Florence Bell	CP	Chapleau East	1948	1 year	
William Colcock	CP	Chapleau East	1949	1 year	
Cecil Corps	CP	Chapleau East	1950	3 years	

- Note:Canadian National Railways' name was changed in 1960 to Canadian National (CN).

=== Rule instruction cars ===
Other types of mobile classroom school cars were converted sleeper cars used as mobile rule instruction cars. These were dropped off at various locations to provide education to railroad workers and test them on rules and procedures.

- The rule instruction car No. 15029, built by National Steel Car in 1916 as the Ville Marie, converted in 1956, and on display at the Alberta Railway Museum.
- Car No. 15019 was an Intercolonial Railway sleeper car built in 1912 as the Stadacona, converted to a rule instruction school car, and was retired in 1972. It is on display at the Northern Ontario Railroad Museum in Capreol.

== See also ==
- Kindergarten on Wheels
- School on Wheels Inc.
