= Yorston =

Yorston is a surname of Scottish origins that may refer to:

- Benny Yorston (1905–1977), British football player
- Corinne Yorston (born 1983), British football player
- Harry Yorston (1929–1992), British football player
- Jacqui Yorston (born 2000), Australian rules footballer
- John MacKay Yorston (1867–1937), Canadian politician

== See also ==
- Yorkston
- Yorston River, Canada
