= Bull Lake (Sheppard Township) =

Lake in Sudbury District, Ontario, Canada

- Location within Ontario
- Location: Sudbury District, Ontario
- Coordinates: 46°53′53″N 80°33′22″W
- Primary outflows: Unnamed creek to Rawson Lake
- Basin countries: Canada
- Max. length: 1.1 km (0.68 mi)
- Max. width: 0.5 km (0.31 mi)
- Surface elevation: 318 m (1,043 ft)

Bull Lake is a lake in geographic Sheppard Township in Sudbury District, Ontario, Canada. It is about 1,100 metres (3,609 ft) long and 500 metres (1,640 ft) wide, and lies at an elevation of 318 metres (1,043 ft) about 32 kilometres (20 mi) northeast of the community of Capreol and 62 kilometres (39 mi) southwest of the community of Temagami. The primary outflow is an unnamed creek to Rawson Lake, and further through a series of lakes, Halleck Lake and Halleck Creek into the Sturgeon River.

A second Bull Lake in Sudbury District that is also part of the same Sturgeon River system, Bull Lake (Turner Township), lies 22 kilometres (14 mi) north.
