= Little Bull Lake (Sudbury District) =

Lake in Sudbury District, Ontario, Canada

- Location within Ontario
- Location: Sudbury District, Ontario
- Coordinates: 47°05′29″N 80°34′08″W
- Primary outflows: Unnamed creek to Bull Lake
- Basin countries: Canada
- Max. length: 0.94 km (0.58 mi)
- Max. width: 0.33 km (0.21 mi)
- Surface elevation: 326 m (1,070 ft)

Little Bull Lake is a lake in Sudbury District, Ontario, Canada. It is about 940 metres (3,084 ft) long and 330 metres (1,083 ft) wide, and lies at an elevation of 326 metres (1,070 ft) about 46 kilometres (29 mi) northeast of the community of Capreol and 62 kilometres (39 mi) west of the community of Temagami. The primary outflow is an unnamed creek to Bull Lake. Little Bull Lake is part of the drainage basin of the Yorston River, which flows into the Sturgeon River.
