= Temiskaming and Northern Ontario 219 =

Preserved TEM 4-6-0 locomotive

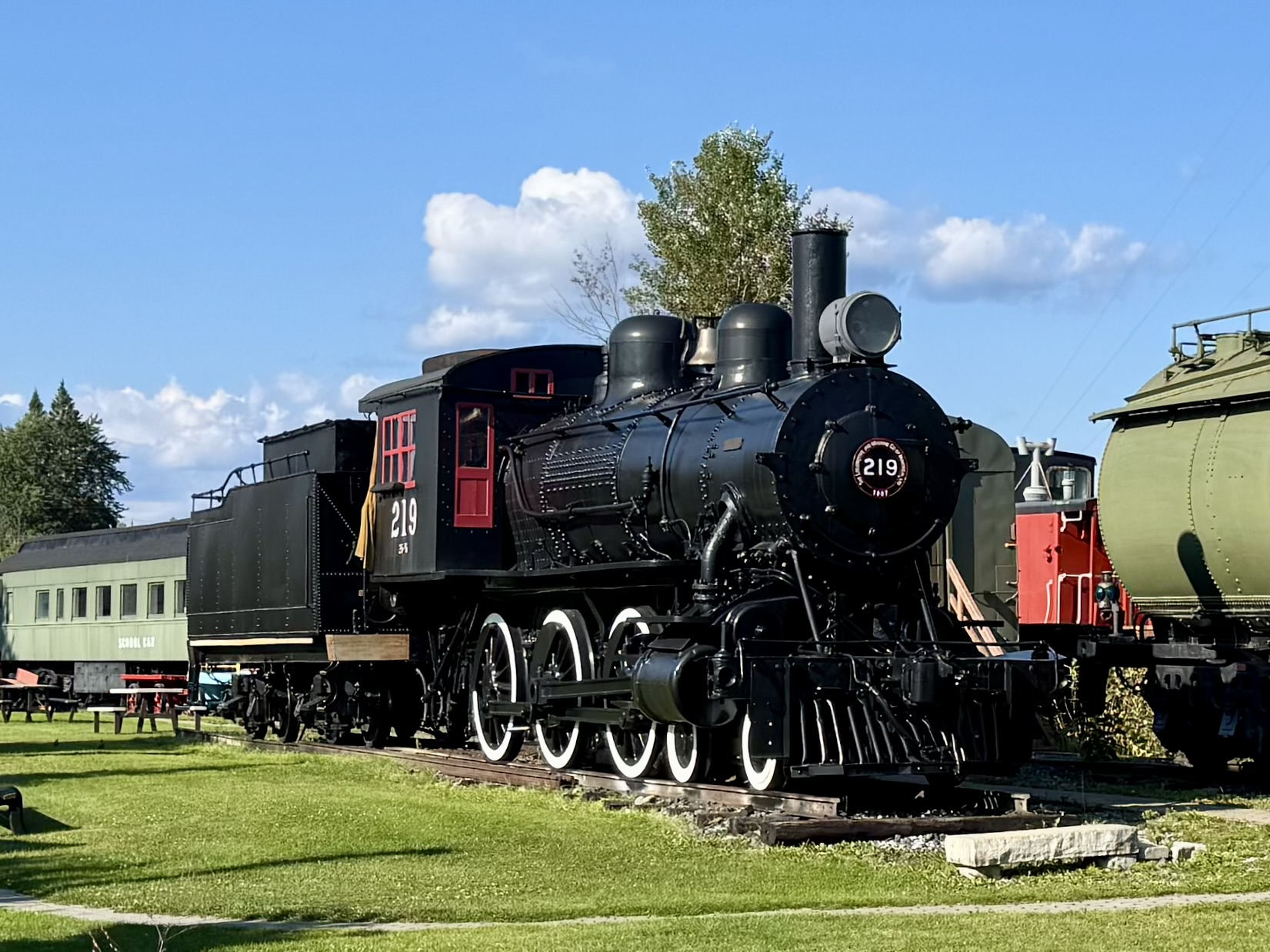
- No. 219 on display in 2025
Type and origin
- Power type: Steam
- Builder: Montreal Locomotive Works
- Order number: 845
- Serial number: 44169
- Build date: December 1907
Specifications
- Configuration
  - Whyte: 4-6-0
  - UIC: 2'C
- Gauge: 4 ft 8 1/2 in (1,435 mm) standard gauge
- Leading dia.: 34 in (0.864 m)
- Driver dia.: 57 in (1.448 m)
- Adhesive weight: 112,000 pounds (51 tonnes; 50 long tons)
- Total weight: 144,000 pounds (65 tonnes; 64 long tons)
- Fuel type: Coal
- Fuel capacity: 22,000 pounds (10.0 t; 9.8 long tons)
- Water cap.: 5,000 imperial gallons (23,000 L)
- Firebox
  - Grate area: 30 sq ft (2.8 m^{2})
- Boiler
  - Type: Round-topped boiler
- Boiler pressure: 180 psi (1.24 MPa)
- Heating surface
  - Firebox: 155 square feet (14.4 m^{2})
  - Tubes and flues: 1,625 sq ft (151.0 m^{2})
  - Total surface: 1,780 sq ft (165 m^{2})
- Cylinders: Two
- Cylinder size: 19 in × 24 in (483 mm × 610 mm)
- Valve gear: Stephenson
- Train heating: Steam generator
- Loco brake: Air brake
Performance figures
- Tractive effort: 23% (23,256 lbf or 103.4 kN)
- Factor of adh.: 4.82
Career
- Operators: 1907-1938; Temiskaming and Northern Ontario Railway; 1938-1975; Normetal Mines
- Number in class: 5th of 6
- Numbers: TEM 119, TEM 219
- Retired: 1938 (sold to Normetal Mines)); 1975 (sold to ONR)
- Restored: 2018 (cosmetic restoration)
- Current owner: Northern Ontario Railway Museum
- Disposition: Static display at the Northern Ontario Railroad Museum in Capreol, Greater Sudbury, Ontario, Canada

Temiskaming and Northern Ontario 219, originally 119, is a preserved 4-6-0 ("ten-wheeler") steam locomotive built in 1907 for the Temiskaming and Northern Ontario Railway (TEM) by Montreal Locomotive Works. It is the oldest surviving Temiskaming and Northern Ontario locomotive and the only surviving locomotive of its class. It is on static display at the Northern Ontario Railroad Museum and Heritage Centre in Capreol, Greater Sudbury, Ontario.

== History ==
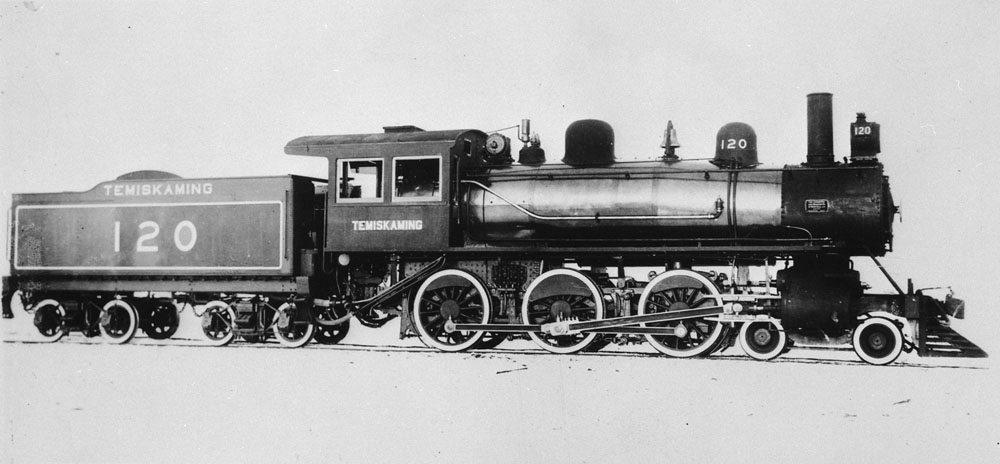
No. 120 of the same class

The locomotive was built as part of an order of six ten-wheel freight locomotives by the Temiskaming and Northern Ontario Railway, with construction numbers of 44165 through 44170, and road numbers of 115 through 120.

The order was placed in March of 1907, with the locomotives delivered in December of that year. The locomotive was delivered with the road number 119 and was in service as a freight locomotive with that number until 1935, when it was changed to 219.

In 1938, TEM sold the locomotive to the Normétal Mining Corporation, which was to complete a road and railway between the Quebec towns of Normétal and Dupuy the following year. The locomotive was in service with Normétal until the copper mine closed in 1975.

== Preservation ==
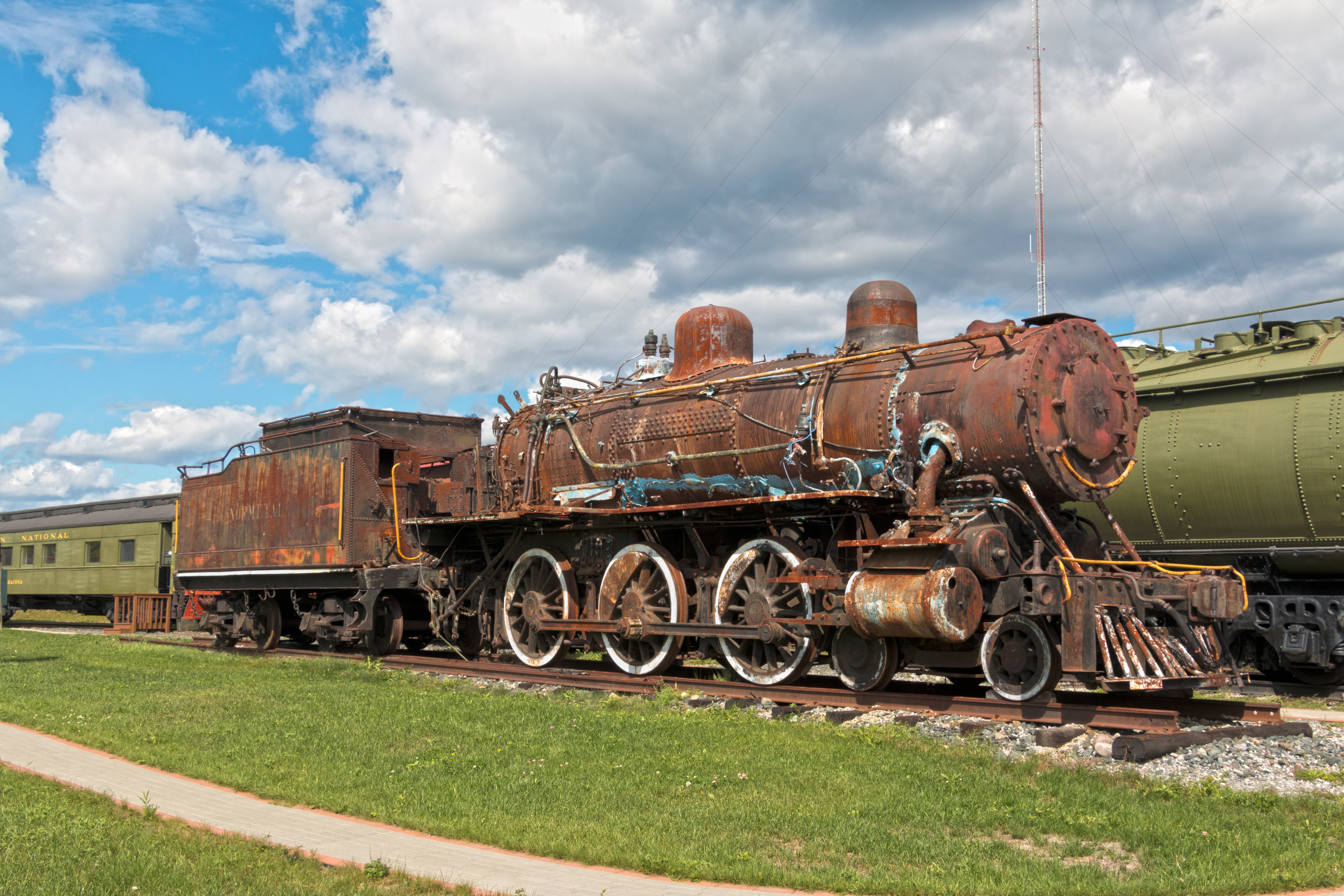
No. 219 before restoration, with cab removed

After the closure of the Normétal mine in 1975, the locomotive was purchased by the Ontario Northland Railway, the successor to Temiskaming and Northern Ontario. The locomotive was then relocated to the Ontario Northland yard in Cochrane, Ontario.

The locomotive was intended to be used as an excursion train, however these plans were not realized due to the cost of refurbishment. The locomotive stayed in the Cochrane yard for the next 39 years as a track bumper, with Ontario Northland listing the locomotive for sale in 2012.

The locomotive was purchased by the Northern Ontario Railroad Museum and Heritage Centre in the community of Capreol in Greater Sudbury, Ontario, and it was installed at the museum in 2014 as a static display. In 2018, the cosmetic restoration of the locomotive was completed.
