= Canadian National 6077 =

Preserved CN steam locomotive

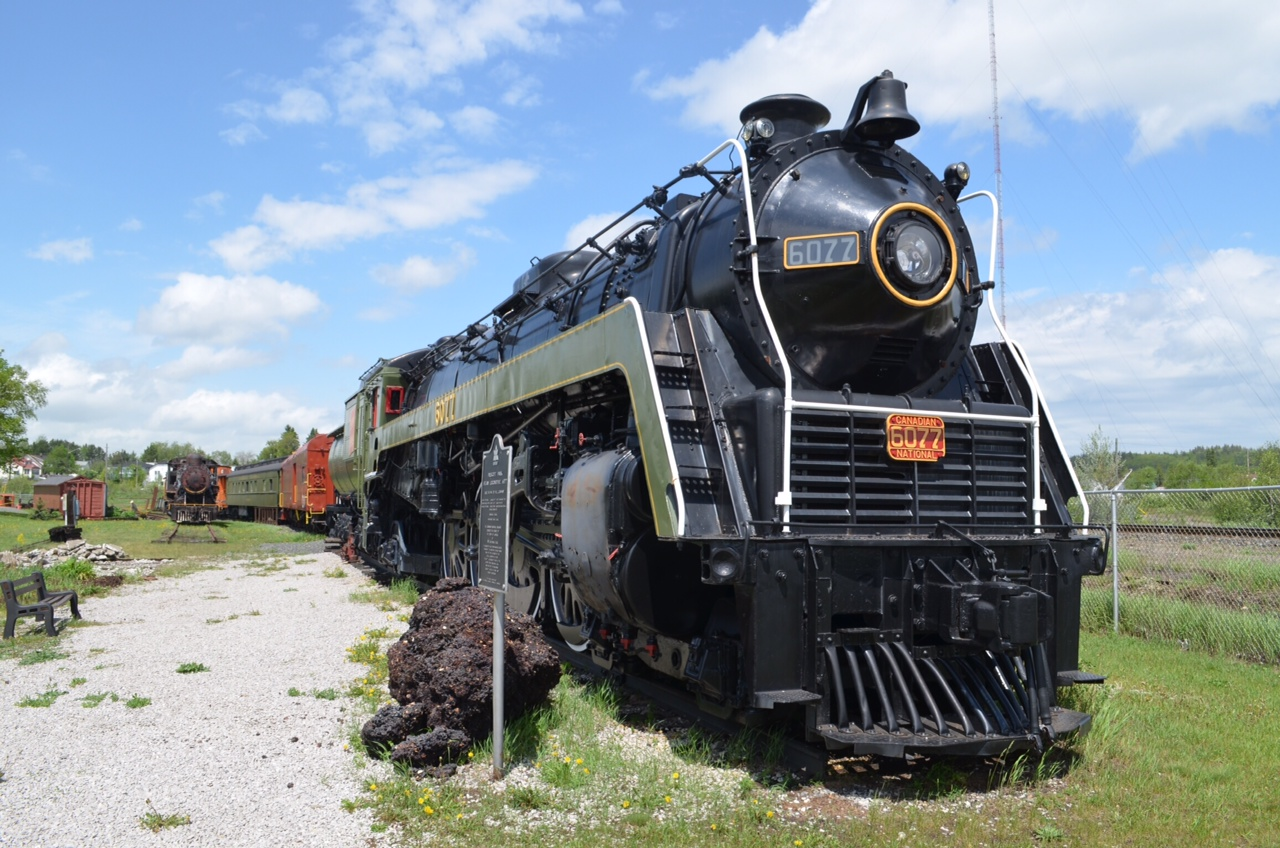
- CN 6077 on display in 2014
Type and origin
- Power type: Steam
- Builder: Montreal Locomotive Works
- Order number: Q-401
- Serial number: 72774
- Model: U-1-f
- Build date: October 1944
Specifications
- Configuration
  - Whyte: 4-8-2
  - UIC: 2′D1′ h2
- Gauge: 4 ft 8 1/2 in (1,435 mm) standard gauge
- Leading dia.: 34 in (0.864 m)
- Driver dia.: 73 in (1.854 m)
- Trailing dia.: 43 in (1.092 m)
- Wheelbase: Coupled: 19 ft 0 in (5.79 m); Loco: 42 ft 2 in (12.85 m); Loco & tender: 80 ft 10 3/4 in (24.66 m)
- Length: 90 ft 0 1/8 in (27.44 m)
- Width: 10 ft 9 in (3.28 m)
- Height: 15 ft 4 1/2 in (4.69 m)
- Adhesive weight: 236,950 pounds (107.48 tonnes; 105.78 long tons)
- Loco weight: 355,700 pounds (161.3 tonnes; 158.8 long tons)
- Tender weight: 281,840 pounds (127.84 tonnes; 125.82 long tons)
- Fuel type: New: Coal; Now: Oil
- Tender cap.: Coal: 18 tons coal, 11,700 gal water; Oil: 5,000 gal oil, 11,000 gal water
- Firebox
  - Grate area: 70.2 sq ft (6.52 m^{2})
- Boiler: 8 ft 6 in (2.59 m) diameter; 42 ft 4 in (12.90 m) length
- Boiler pressure: 260 psi (1.79 MPa)
- Heating surface
  - Firebox: 386 square feet (35.9 m^{2})
  - Tubes and flues: 3,198 sq ft (297.1 m^{2})
  - Total surface: 3,584 sq ft (333.0 m^{2})
- Superheater
  - Type: Schmidt type E
  - Heating area: 1,570 sq ft (146 m^{2})
- Cylinders: 2
- Cylinder size: 24 in × 30 in (610 mm × 762 mm)
- Valve gear: Walschaerts
- Train heating: Steam heat
Performance figures
- Tractive effort: 52% (52,315 lbf or 232.7 kN)
- Factor of adh.: 4.5
Career
- Operators: Canadian National Railway
- Class: U-1-f
- Number in class: 17 of 20
- Numbers: CN 6077
- Nicknames: Bullet-Nosed Betty
- First run: January 1945
- Retired: 1960
- Restored: July 5, 1967 (1st cosmetic restoration); 2008 (2nd cosmetic restoration)
- Current owner: Northern Ontario Railway Museum
- Disposition: On static display

Canadian National 6077 is a preserved U-1-f class 4-8-2 "Mountain" type steam locomotive built in 1944 by the Montreal Locomotive Works (MLW) for Canadian National Railway (CN). It is one of three surviving locomotives in its class, along with 6060 and 6069. Retired in 1960, it is on static display at the Northern Ontario Railroad Museum and Heritage Centre (NORMHC) in Capreol, Greater Sudbury, Ontario.

== History ==
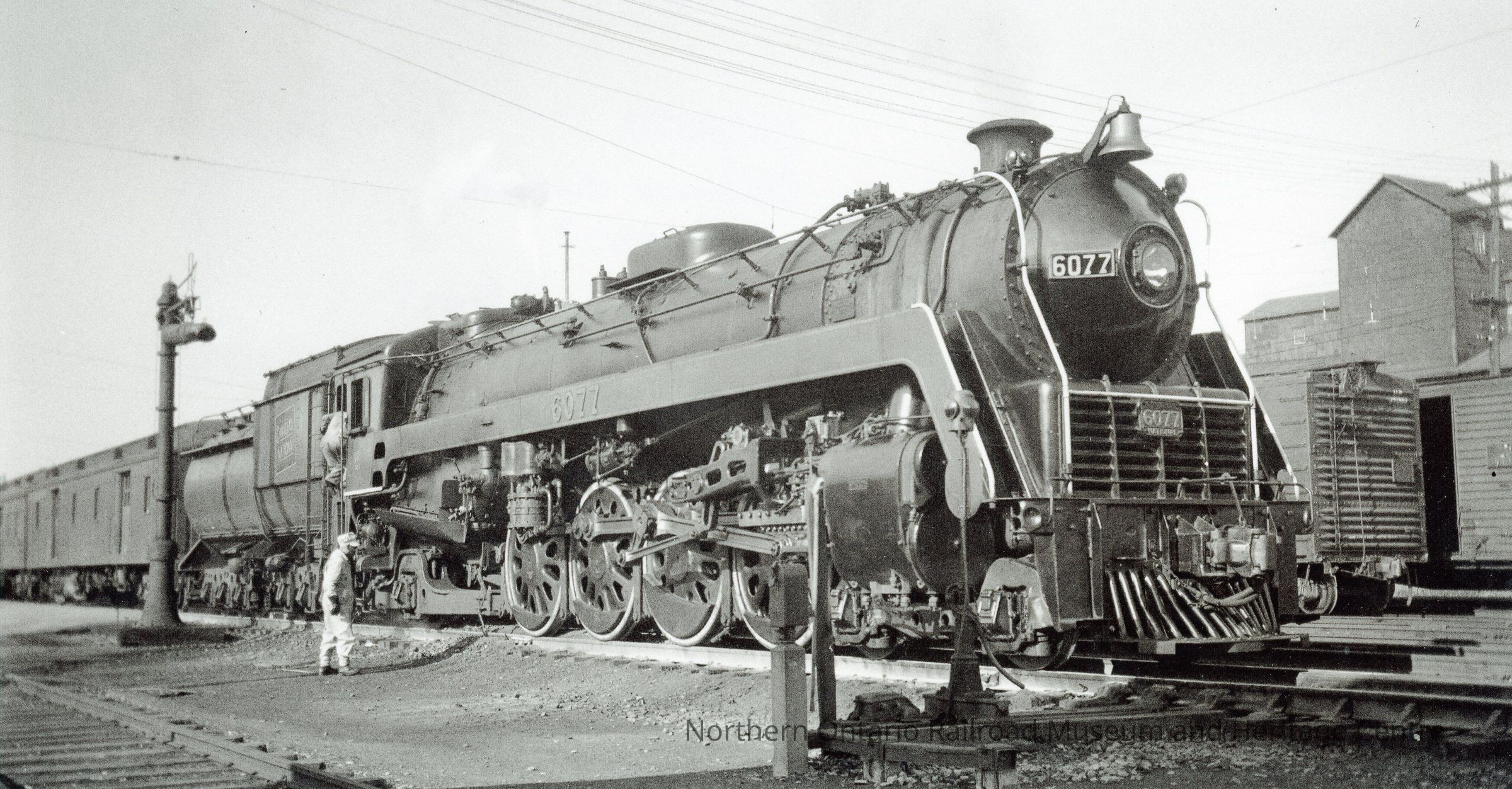
CN 6077 at Oshawa

No. 6077 was completed by Montreal Locomotive Works (MLW) in October 1944 as the seventeenth locomotive out of an order of twenty U-1-f class 4-8-2 locomotives for Canadian National Railways (CN), the last order of steam locomotives made by Canadian National before dieselization.

The U-1-f class was the last design modification to the U-1 class of locomotives that were first introduced in 1930. The U-1-f class had a cast steel frame and a larger boiler, which achieved a higher boiler pressure. Cosmetically, the U-1-f class was given a semi-streamlined design with a nose cone mounted to the smokebox door at the front of the locomotive. The shape of the nose cone earned the locomotives in the class the nickname Bullet-nosed Betty.

With the locomotives driver diameter of 73 inches (1.85 m), the locomotives were built for speedy express passenger and freight services. The locomotive pulled trains such as the Maple Leaf between Toronto and Chicago until 1958.

Half of the class was converted from coal to oil in September of 1958 at Stratford, Ontario, and its Vanderbilt tender was replaced with an oil tender from the 2-10-2 CN 4328. Thereafter, the locomotive was operated in western Canada until its retirement in 1960.

== Preservation ==
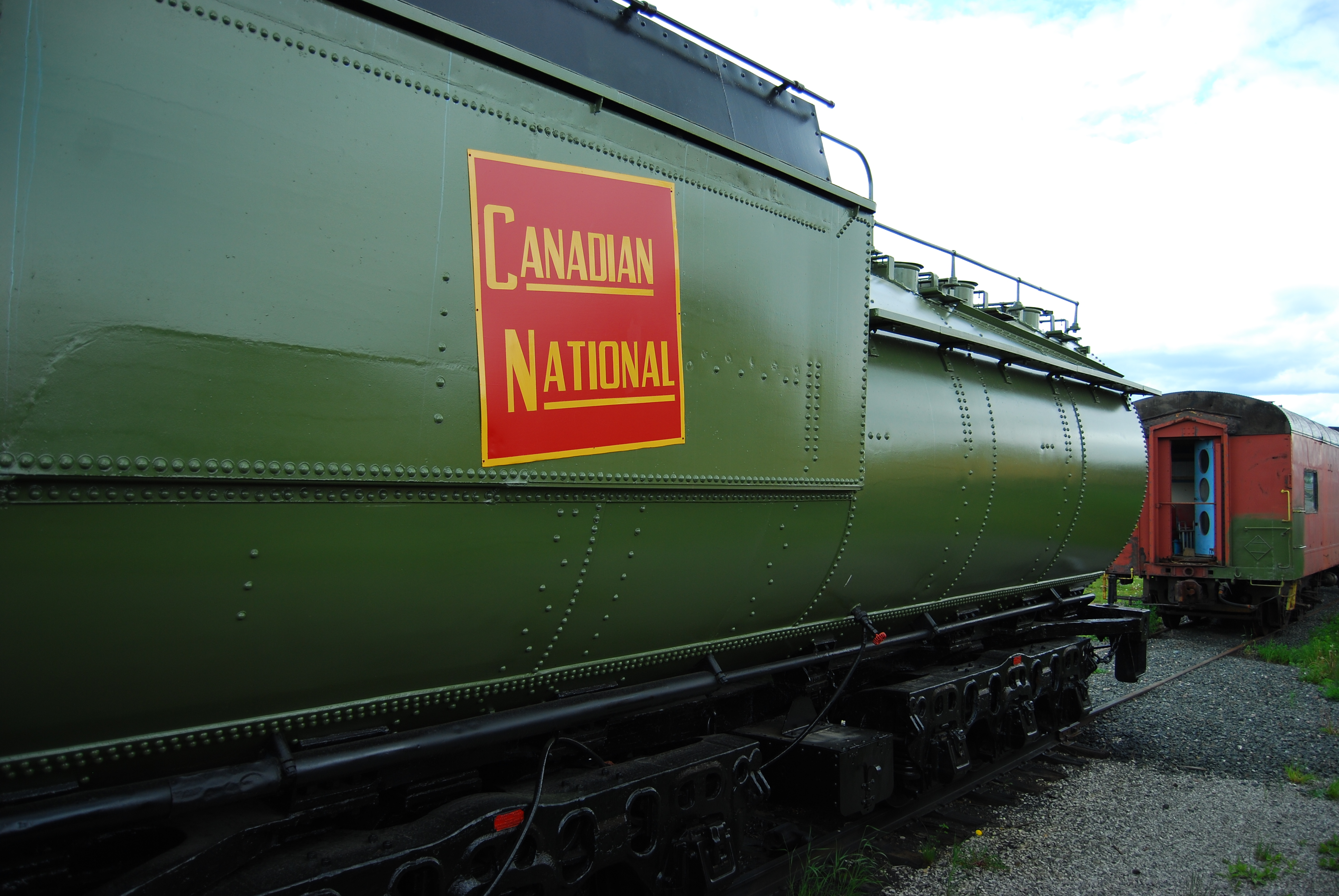
Tender of 6077

After the locomotive was retired, it was relocated to Winnipeg to be scrapped. Harold Prescott, then-mayor of Capreol, Ontario, organized to have a steam locomotive donated to town due to its historical connection to the railway. In 1967, Canadian National gave 6077 to the town. After it was relocated to Capreol from Winnipeg, the locomotive was cosmetically restored and placed as a static display in the town.

The land where the locomotive was placed, named Prescott Park, became the Northern Ontario Railroad Museum and Heritage Centre (NORMHC) in 1993. The locomotive was refurbished again in 2008.

== Derailment ==
The locomotive was involved in a derailment on the evening of February 1, 1945, east of Brantford, Ontario, a month after its first run. The locomotive was attached to a pilot engine pulling the westbound Maple Leaf toward Chicago when the engineer of 6077 sensed that the engineer of the pilot locomotive had not applied the brakes for a sharp bend up ahead, and engaged the emergency brakes.

This caused the wheels of the locomotive to lock, and it began skidding on the rails. This caused the locomotive to become more rigid, and 6077 and the pilot locomotive derailed and dropped down an embankment. The first car behind 6077, a refrigerator car, derailed off of the rail overpass at Clarence Street and landed on the south side of the overpass, with the baggage car behind it landing on the north side in Greenwood Cemetery. The remaining cars did not derail, and coasted to a stop to the east of the station at George Street.

Engineer John A. Jarvis and fireman L. McIntyre of 6077 were both killed, and the crew of the pilot engine were seriously injured. While no passengers were killed in the derailment, several were injured.
