= Yorkston =

Yorkston is a surname. Notable people with the surname include:

- James Yorkston (born 1971), Scottish musician, singer-songwriter, and author
- John Yorkston (born 1954), Scottish investor

== See also ==
- Yorkstone
- Yorkton
- Yorston
