= Bull Lake (Sioux Narrows-Nestor Falls) =

Lake in Kenora District, Ontario, Canada

- Location in Ontario
- Location: Kenora District, Ontario
- Coordinates: 49°31′40″N 93°59′54″W
- Part of: Hudson Bay drainage basin
- Primary outflows: Unnamed creek to Mac Lake
- Basin countries: Canada
- Max. length: 570 m (1,870 ft)
- Max. width: 260 m (850 ft)
- Surface elevation: 358 m (1,175 ft)

Bull Lake is a lake in geographic Devonshire Township in the municipality of Sioux Narrows-Nestor Falls, Kenora District, Ontario, Canada. It is about 570 metres (1,870 ft) long and 260 metres (853 ft) wide, and lies at an elevation of 358 metres (1,175 ft) about 15 kilometres (9.3 mi) northeast of the community of Sioux Narrows. The primary outflow is an unnamed creek to Mac Lake, whose waters flow via the Black River into Lake of the Woods.

== See also ==
- List of lakes in Ontario
