= Vale Railway =

Industrial railway in Ontario, Canada

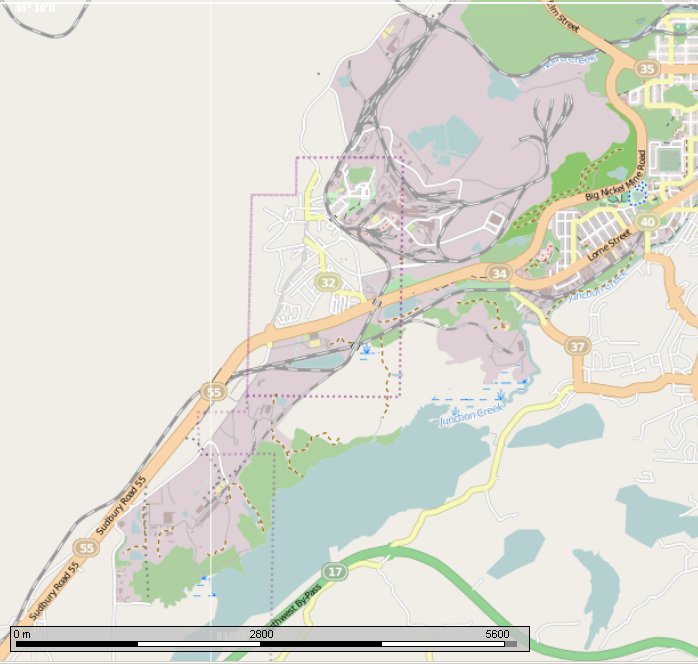
- Copper Cliff smelter is at the top of the map (right of number 32) and Copper Cliff nickel refinery is at the bottom

Overview
- Headquarters: Sudbury
- Reporting mark: VAEX
- Locale: Greater Sudbury, Ontario, Canada

Technical
- Track gauge: 4 ft 8 1/2 in (1,435 mm) standard gauge

The Vale Railway (reporting mark VAEX), formerly the INCO Railway (reporting mark INCX), is an industrial railway operating in the City of Greater Sudbury, Ontario, Canada. It is owned and operated by Vale Limited.

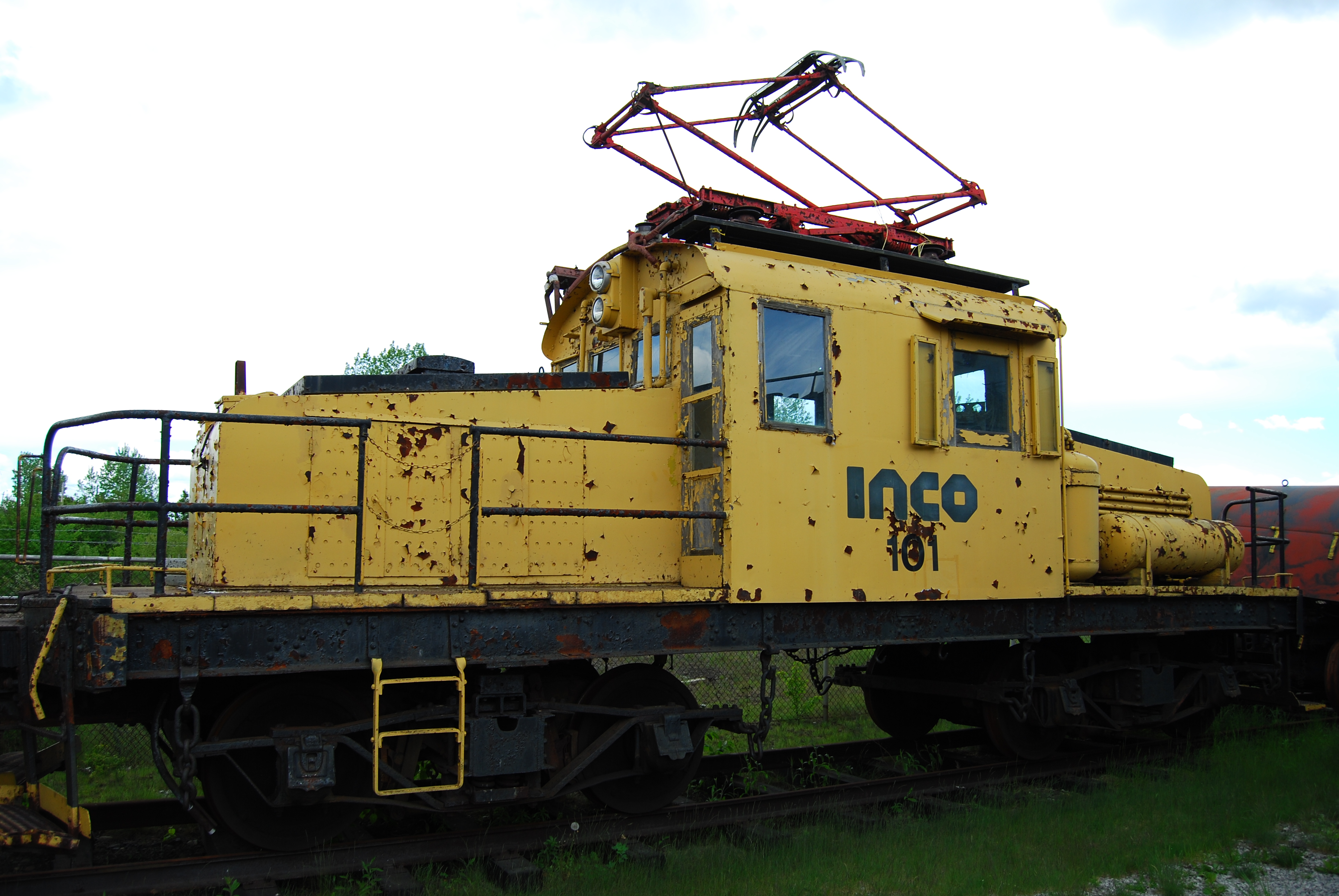
Former Inco electric locomotive at the Northern Ontario Railroad Museum

An internal, private railway, the line connects Vale's mines and processing plants that dominates the city's skyline. The line serves Copper Cliff North Mine, Copper Cliff South Mine, Creighton Mine, Frood Mine, Stobie Mine, Clarabelle Mill, Copper Cliff Smelter, and Copper Cliff Nickel Refinery. The isolated Levack mine spur in the north end of the city serves Coleman Mine and is operated by the Canadian Pacific Railway.

The line was once entirely electrified along its route. Electrification began in 1926, but ended in 2000 in favour of diesel locomotives.

The following junctions exist with the line:

- Canadian Pacific Cartier Subdivision at Sprecher (MP 81.7) where loaded ore cars from Coleman Mine are delivered
- Canadian Pacific Cartier Subdivision at Levack (MP 102.5) where empty ore cars from Clarabelle Mill are delivered
- Canadian Pacific Nickel Subdivision at Clarabelle (MP 3.3) where freight is exchanged with both the Canadian Pacific Railway and the Canadian National Railway
- Canadian Pacific Webbwood Subdivision (leased to Huron Central) at Copper Cliff (MP 4.8)

== Locomotive roster ==
VAEX rosters 8 re-manufactured EMD GP38-4M locomotives for use on ore trains from the mines, slag trains from the smelter, or for local plant switching of various chemicals and products. These locomotives have upgraded electrical systems and are set up for remote operation.

| Model | Maker | Numbers | Build Date | Remarks |
|---|---|---|---|---|
| GP38-4M | EMD | 2001 | Feb-1964 | Nee NW GP35 #222 Rebuilt By MPI to GP38-4M |
| GP38-4M | EMD | 2002 | Jun-1965 | Nee SP GP35 #7757 Rebuilt By MPI to GP38-4M |
| GP38-4M | EMD | 2003 | May-1964 | Nee PRR GP35 #2256 Rebuilt By MPI to GP38-4M |
| GP38-4M | EMD | 2004 | Feb-1964 | Nee C&NW GP35 #825 Rebuilt By MPI to GP38-4M |
| GP38-4M | EMD | 2005 | Apr-1964 | Nee C&NW GP35 #836 Rebuilt By MPI to GP38-4M |
| GP38-4M | EMD | 2006 | Apr-1964 | Nee C&NW GP35 #841 Rebuilt By MPI to GP38-4M |
| GP38-4M | EMD | 2007 | Mar-1965 | Nee C&NW GP35 #864 Rebuilt By MPI to GP38-4M |
| GP38-4M | EMD | 2008 | Apr-1964 | Nee C&NW GP35 #843 Rebuilt By MPI to GP38-4M |
