= Bull Lake (Frontenac County) =

Lake in Frontenac County, Ontario, Canada

- Location within Ontario
- Location: Central Frontenac, Frontenac County, Ontario
- Coordinates: 44°41′14″N 76°58′33″W
- Primary inflows: Salmon River from Buck Lake
- Primary outflows: Salmon River to Horseshoe Lake
- Basin countries: Canada
- Max. length: 1.7 km (1.1 mi)
- Max. width: 0.7 km (0.43 mi)
- Surface elevation: 186 m (610 ft)

Bull Lake is a lake on the Salmon River system in Central Frontenac, Frontenac County, Ontario, Canada. It is 3.7 kilometres (2.3 mi) long and .5 kilometres (0.3 mi) wide and lies at an elevation of 186 metres (610 ft) about 2.5 kilometres (1.6 mi) east of the community of Elm Tree. The primary inflow is a channel from Buck Lake, and primary outflow is a channel to Horseshoe Lake. There are a handful of year-round residents but most are 3 seasonal. It did not have a residential park around it until 2003.

== See also ==
- List of lakes in Ontario
