= Northern Ontario Railroad Museum =

Northern Ontario Railroad Museum and Heritage Centre
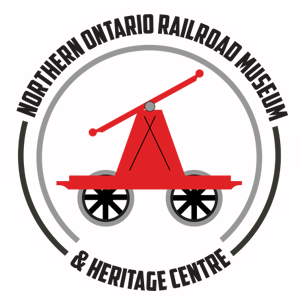

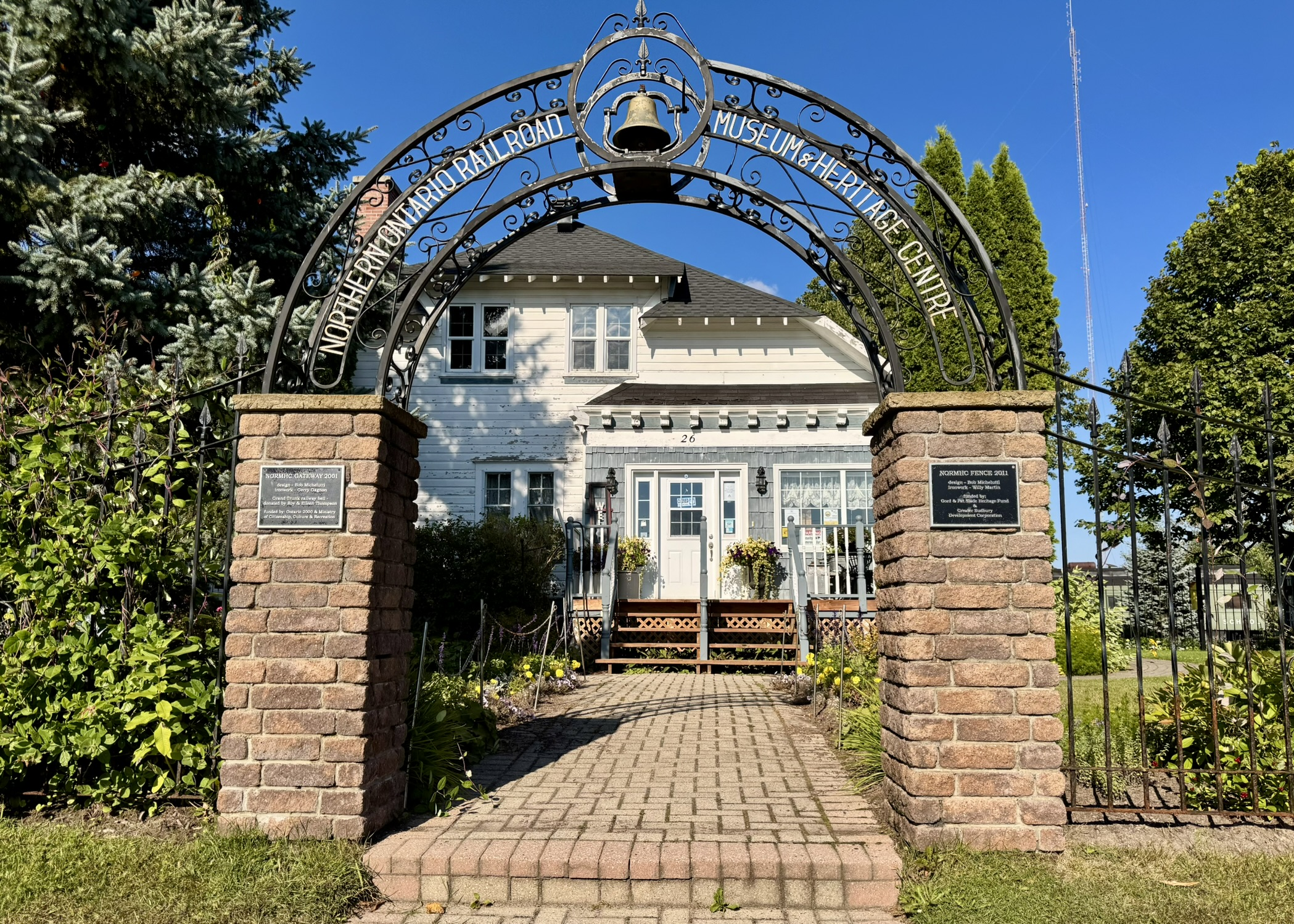
- Established: 31 August 1993; 33 years ago
- Location: 26 Bloor Street; Capreol, Ontario; P0M 1H0
- Coordinates: 46.7092°N 80.9242°W
- Visitors: approx. 13,000 per year
- President: Cody Cacciotti
- Website: www.normhc.ca

The Northern Ontario Railroad Museum and Heritage Centre (NORMHC) is a rail and local history museum located in the community of Capreol in Greater Sudbury, Ontario, Canada.

== History ==
In 1967, the Town of Capreol was given steam locomotive CN 6077 by the Canadian National Railway as a monument to the towns history. The locomotive was placed as a static display on a parcel of land next to Bloor Street. The park was named Prescott Park for then-mayor of Capreol Harold Prescott, who was a central figure in having the locomotive donated to the town. Caboose No. 77526 was added to the park in 1969.

The Capreol Heritage Committee was founded in 1982, and the following year Rules Instruction Car No. 15019 was added to Prescott Park. In the 1980s Eileen Thompson, who served on the museum's board for many years, set up history displays in the parks caboose during July and August.

In 1993, the museum was incorporated as a non-profit organization. The 1916 Superintendents House, located adjacent to Prescott Park, was purchased by the town in 1997 and became the main building of the museum in 1998. It was designated as a heritage site in 2002.

Prescott Park was expanded in 2006, with Inco locomotives 101 and 116, caboose 77562, and hot metal car No. 5 added to the park the following year. The Garden of Life was installed in association with the Trillium Gift of Life Network in 2010.

In 2012, the former Capreol fire hall was acquired by the museum. The building, constructed in 1929, became the museums Heritage Centre, library, and archives. Temiskaming and Northern Ontario No. 219 was added to Prescott Park in 2014, and cosmetically restored in 2018.

== Superintendent's House ==
The main museum building is housed inside the former Canadian Northern Railway Superintendent's house, constructed in 1916. The house served as the residence of the superintendent of rail operations in Capreol until the 1950s, and was a private residence until it was acquired by the Town of Capreol in 1997.

The house was designated as a heritage site under the Ontario Heritage Act in 2002. The house includes architectural elements such as eyebrow-shaped roof arches, original oak flooring, baseboards, french doors and window frames.

== Heritage Centre ==
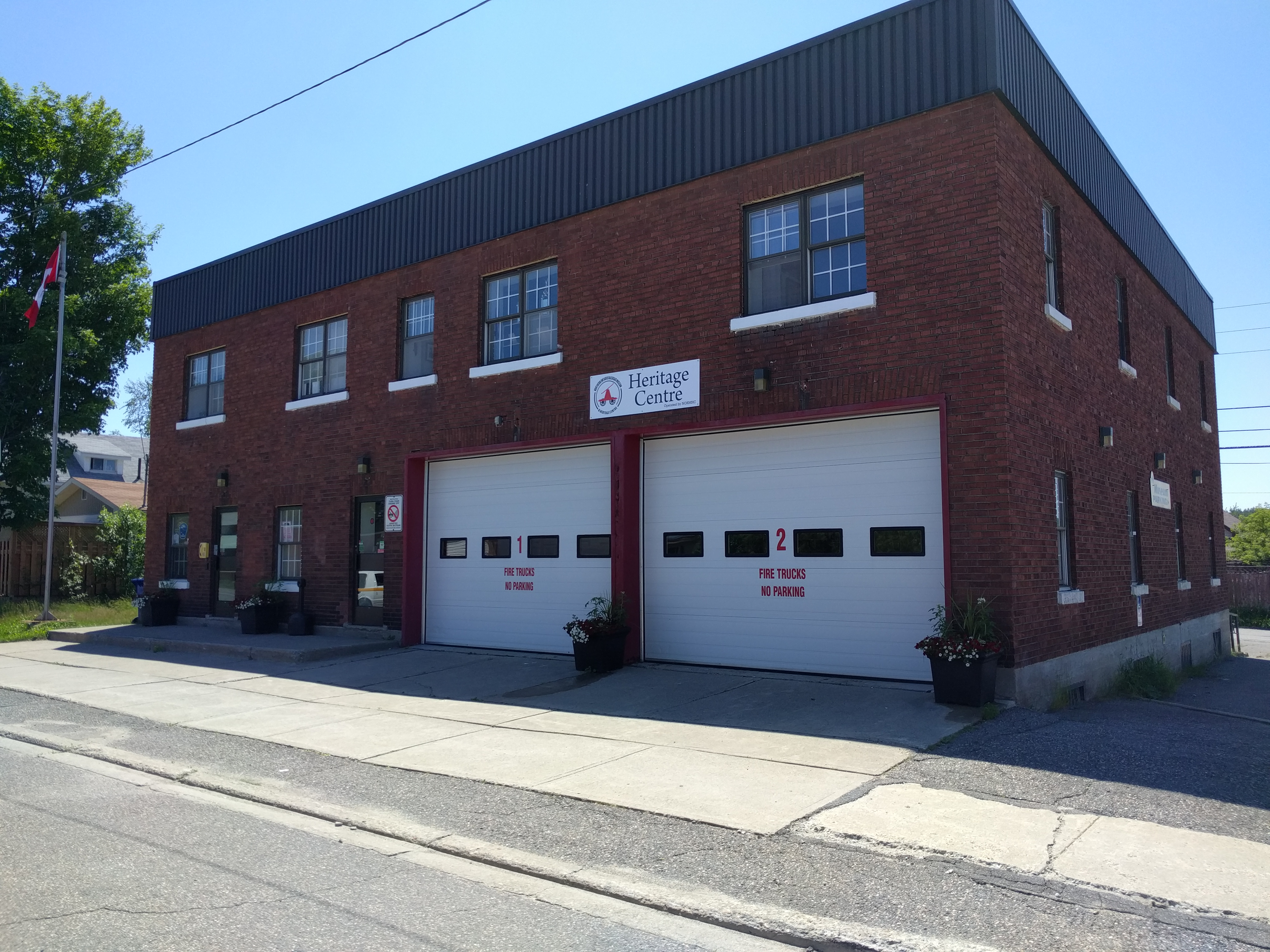
NORMHC Heritage Centre

The museum's Heritage Centre is located in the former Capreol Fire Hall building, constructed in 1929. In addition to being an active fire hall until 2010, the building also served as the Town of Capreol police station, jail, and council chambers. The Heritage Centre houses the Dale A. Wilson Reference Library, the Doug Mohns Heritage Room, and a fire hall display including a 1929 Gotfredson-Bickle firetruck owned by the Capreol Firefighters Club, a 1916 horse-drawn hose cart, and the cab of a 1986 Ford C-Series Superior firetruck.

=== Sudbury Railway Modellers Club ===
In 2017, the museum announced the opening of a 1,000 square feet (93 m^{2}) HO scale layout, completed in association with the Sudbury Railway Modellers Club. The layout has 600 feet (180 m) of track and is one of the largest layouts in Northern Ontario.

== Prescott Park ==
Prescott Park contains the museums outdoor exhibits, locomotives, and rolling stock.

=== Locomotives ===
Image	Railway	Builder	Class	Configuration	Number	Notes	Ref.
	Canadian National Railway	Montreal Locomotive Works	U-1-f	4-8-2	No. 6077	Built in 1944 with a serial number of 72774. One of three preserved examples of this type.	
	Temiskaming and Northern Ontario Railway	Montreal Locomotive Works		4-6-0	No. 219 (119)	Built in 1907. Owned by Normetal Mining Corporation from 1938 until 1975.	
	Inco Railway	Westinghouse Electric/National Steel Car	50 Ton	Steeplecab	No. 101 (E12)	Built in 1919 for the Hydro-Electric Power Commission with a serial number of LE27. Retired in 1998.	
	Inco Railway	General Electric	100 Ton	Steeplecab	No. 116	Built in 1948 with the serial number 29128. Rebuilt in 2000, retired in 2001.	

=== Rolling stock ===
Image	Railway	Builder	Type	Number	Notes	Ref.
	Grand Trunk Railway		Caboose	No. 77562	Built as a boxcar in 1897.	
	Canadian National Railway	Hawker Siddeley Canada	Caboose	No. 79231	Built in 1967. Owned by INCO Railway from 1991 to 1998.	
	Intercolonial Railway	Pullman Company	Sleeping car	No. 15019 Stadacona	Built in 1912 as a sleeping car, later reconfigured as a rules instruction car. Displayed as a school car.	
	Canadian National Railway	National Steel Car	Baggage car	No. 60049	Built in 1953. Later used as a warehouse car.	
	Canadian National Railway	Eastern Car Company	Wedge plow	No. 55208	Built in 1924. Single track wedge plow with wings.	
	Canadian National Railway	Browning-Wellman	Rail crane	No. 50392	Built in 1957.	
	Inco Railway		Bottle car	No. 5		
	Inco Railway		Slag pot car		Formerly on display at the Big Nickel.	

== Gallery ==
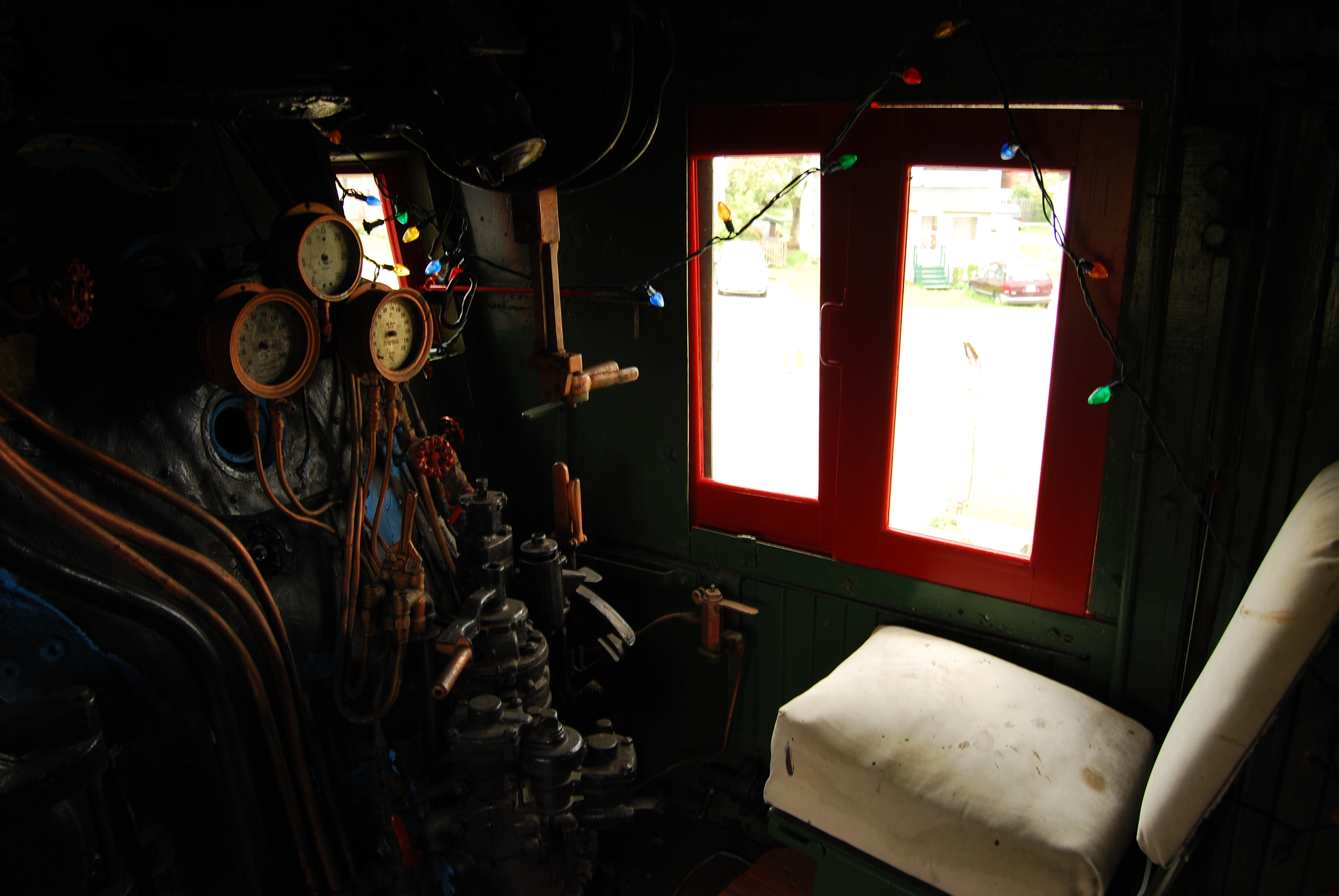
The cab of CN 6077

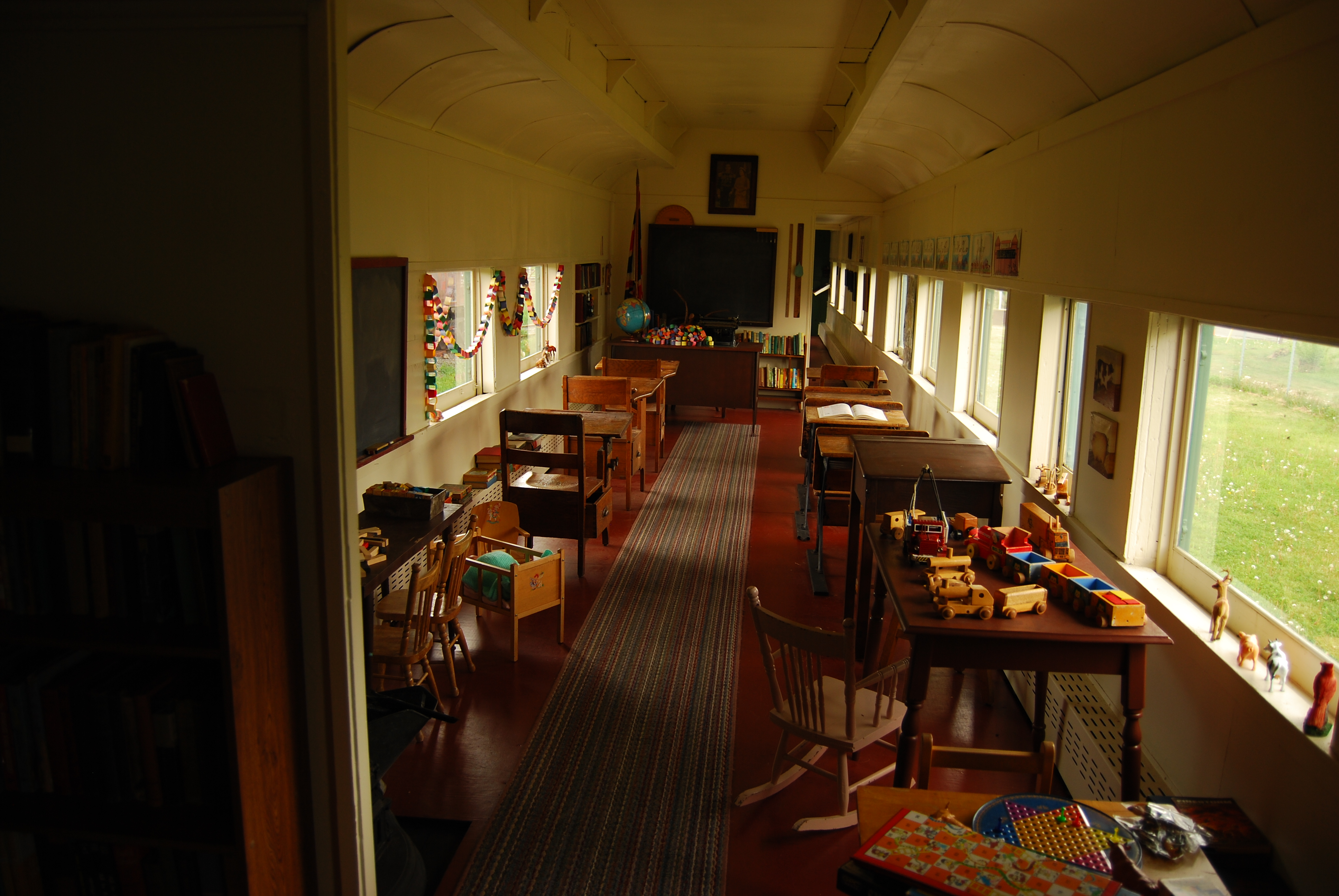
School car display

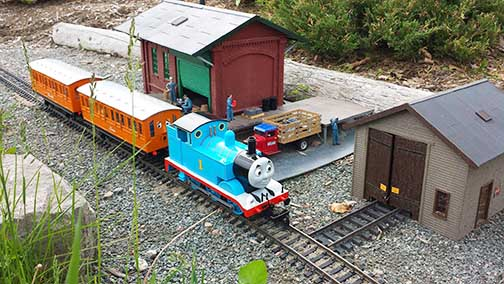
G Scale layout in Prescott Park

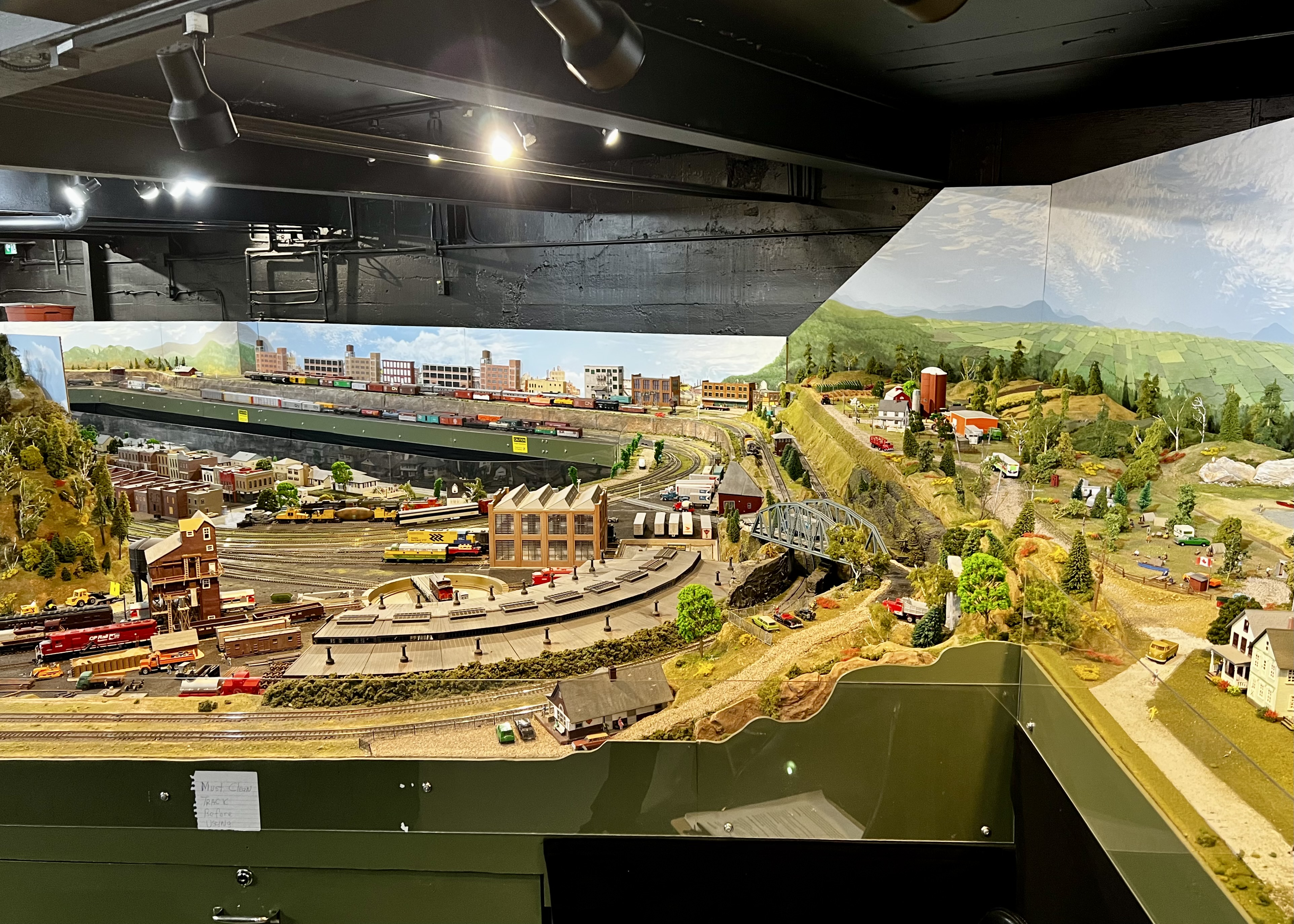
HO Scale layout

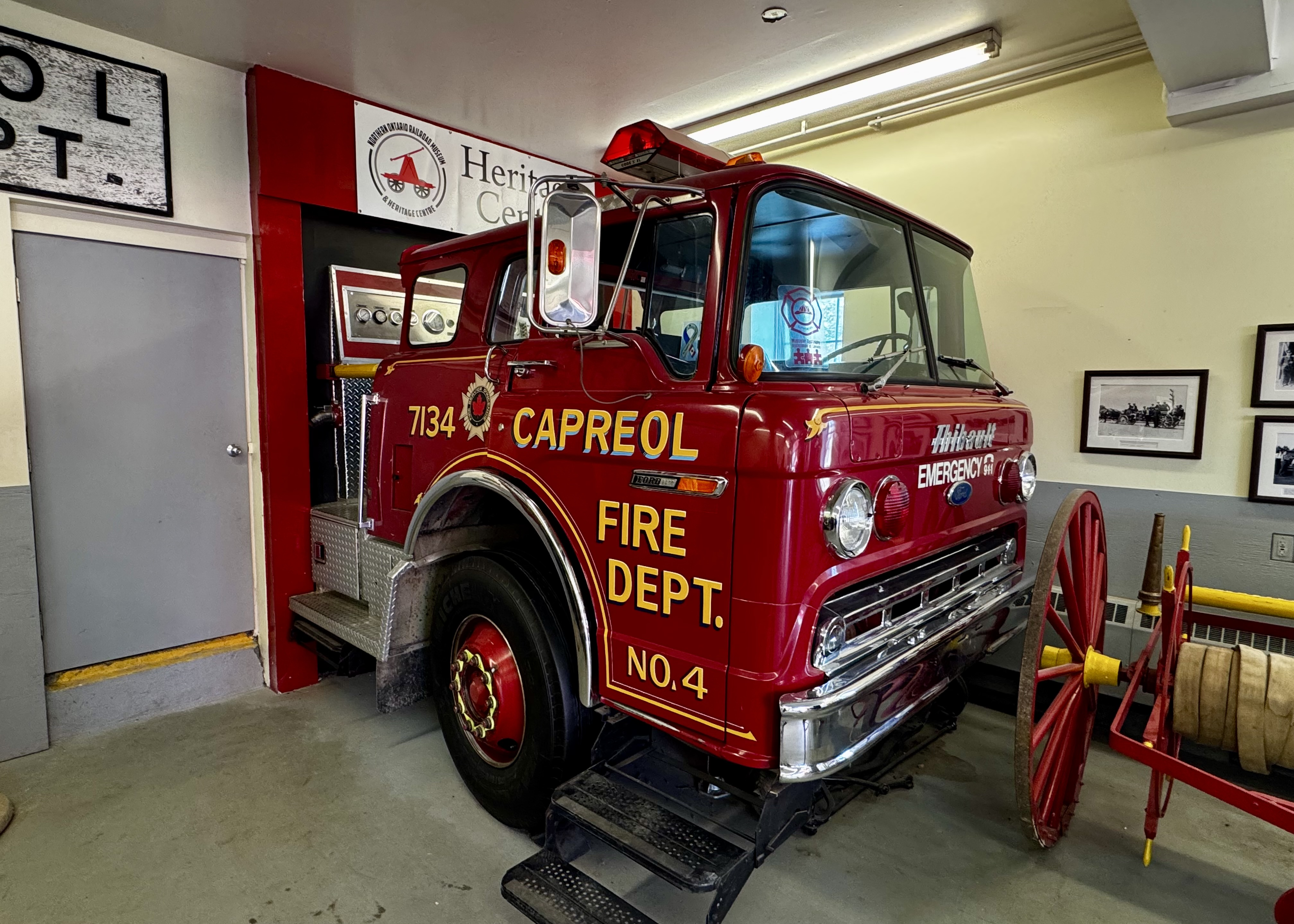
Fire Hall Display

== See also ==
- List of museums in Canada
- List of railway museums
- List of historic places in Greater Sudbury
- List of oldest buildings and structures in Greater Sudbury
