= Canadian National Class U-1-f =

Canadian steam locomotive class

Canadian National U-1-f Class
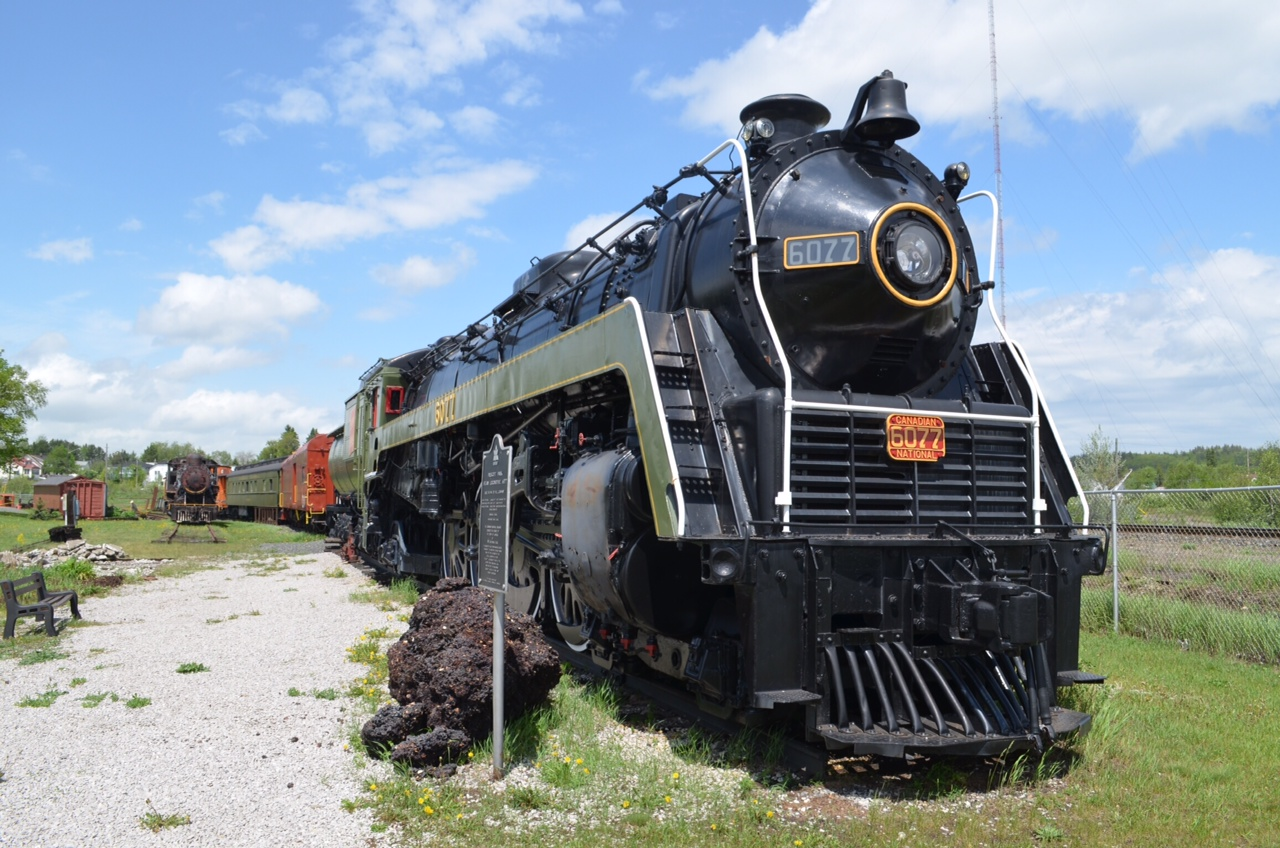
- CN 6077 on display at the Northern Ontario Railroad Museum
Type and origin
- Power type: Steam
- Builder: Montreal Locomotive Works
- Order number: Q-401
- Serial number: 72757–72776
- Build date: October 1944 to January 1945
- Total produced: 20
Specifications
- Configuration
  - Whyte: 4-8-2
  - UIC: 2′D1′h2
- Gauge: 4 ft 8 1/2 in (1,435 mm)
- Leading dia.: 34 in (0.864 m)
- Driver dia.: 73 in (1.854 m)
- Trailing dia.: 43 in (1.092 m)
- Wheelbase: Coupled: 19 ft 0 in (5.79 m); Loco: 42 ft 2 in (12.85 m); Loco & tender: 80 ft 10 3/4 in (24.66 m)
- Length: 90 ft 0 1/8 in (27.44 m)
- Width: 10 ft 9 in (3.28 m)
- Height: 15 ft 4 1/2 in (4.69 m)
- Adhesive weight: 236,950 lb (107.48 t)
- Loco weight: 355,700 lb (161.3 t)
- Tender weight: 281,840 lb (127.84 t)
- Fuel type: New: Coal; Now: Oil
- Tender cap.: Coal: 18 tons coal, 11,700 imp gal (53,000 L) water; Oil: 5,000 imp gal (23,000 L) oil, 11,000 imp gal (50,000 L) water
- Firebox
  - Grate area: 70.2 sq ft (6.52 m^{2})
- Boiler pressure: 260 lbf/in^{2} (1.79 MPa)
- Heating surface
  - Firebox: 386 square feet (35.9 m^{2})
  - Tubes and flues: 3,198 sq ft (297.1 m^{2})
  - Total surface: 3,584 sq ft (333.0 m^{2})
- Superheater
  - Type: Schmidt type E
  - Heating area: 1,570 sq ft (146 m^{2})
- Cylinders: 2
- Cylinder size: 24 in × 30 in (610 mm × 762 mm)
- Valve gear: Walschaerts
- Train heating: Steam heat
Performance figures
- Tractive effort: 52% (52,315 lbf or 232.7 kN)
- Factor of adh.: 4.5
Career
- Operators: Canadian National Railways
- Class: U-1-f
- Numbers: 6060–6079
- Nicknames: Bullet Nose Betty
- Retired: 1960
- Preserved: Three: 6060, 6069, 6077
- Disposition: Three preserved, remainder scrapped

Canadian National Railways U-1-f class locomotives were a class of twenty 4-8-2 or Mountain type locomotives built by Montreal Locomotive Works in 1944. They were numbered 6060–6079 by CN and nicknamed "Bullet Nose Bettys" due to their distinctive cone-shape smokebox door cover.

== Construction history ==
The order for these engines came during World War II when steel was of extreme value. The mountain type locomotive was a step down in size from the much more prevalent Northern Type (4-8-4). As a result of this the mountain type had less power but more speed and served well as a general purpose workhorse.

== Modifications ==
Half the class had been converted to oil-firing by October 1944. This resulted in the 18-ton coal/11,700-imperial-gallon (53 m^{3}) tender being exchanged for a 5,000-imperial-gallon (23 m^{3}) oil/11,000-imperial-gallon (50 m^{3}) water tender. In later years several locomotives lost the distinctive cone-shaped smokebox door cover.

== Preservation ==
Of the twenty locomotives that were built, only three remain in existence: 6060 owned by the Rocky Mountain Rail Society at the Alberta Prairie Railway, Stettler, Alberta; 6069 at Sarnia, Ontario; and 6077 at the Northern Ontario Railroad Museum, at Capreol, Ontario.

== 6060's restoration and run to Expo 86 ==
In 1985 through to early 1986, Harry Home led efforts to restore CN 6060 and run it to Expo 86 in Vancouver. The 6060 was rebuilt in Jasper, Alberta, and was run under its own power to Vancouver for the "Cavalcade of Steam", an event which celebrated operational steam locomotives from around the world. 6060 arrived in Vancouver on the second-to-last day of the steam exhibit, and was welcomed by an extremely large crowd of people, happy to see the success of the restoration.
