= GMD NF110 =

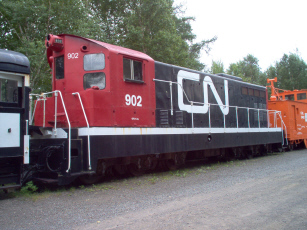
- Canadian National Railway NF110 number 902 on display at Lewisporte, Newfoundland on 13 September 2004
Type and origin
- Power type: Diesel-electric
- Builder: General Motors Diesel
- Order number: GMD C-131 and C-151
- Serial number: GMD A303–A305, A435–440
- Model: NF110
- Build date: 1952–1953
- Total produced: 9
Specifications
- Configuration
  - AAR: C-C
  - UIC: Co′Co′
- Gauge: 3 ft 6 in (1,067 mm)
- Trucks: EMD Flexicoil
- Minimum curve: Alone: 23° 250.79 ft (76.44 m)
- Wheelbase: 42 ft 2 in (12.85 m) truck centers
- Length: 55 ft 2 1/2 in (16.83 m)
- Width: 10 ft 3 1/2 in (3.14 m)
- Height: 15 ft 4 in (4.67 m)
- Loco weight: 221,000–222,180 lb (100,240–100,780 kg) or 110.5–111.09 short tons (98.66–99.19 long tons; 100.24–100.78 t)
- Fuel type: Diesel fuel
- Fuel capacity: 600 imp gal (2,700 L; 720 US gal)
- Lubricant cap.: 138 imp gal (630 L; 166 US gal)
- Coolant cap.: 182 imp gal (830 L; 219 US gal)
- Sandbox cap.: 25 cu ft (0.71 m^{3})
- Prime mover: EMD 12-567
- RPM range: 275–800
- Engine type: V12 diesel
- Generator: EMD D-15B
- Traction motors: EMD D-19, 6 off
- Cylinders: 12
- MU working: Yes
- Train heating: None
- Loco brake: Air
- Train brakes: Air, schedule 6-SL
Performance figures
- Maximum speed: 60 mph (97 km/h)
- Power output: 1,200 hp (890 kW)
- Tractive effort: Continuous: 40,000 lbf (177.9 kN)
Career
- Operators: Canadian National Railways
- Class: Y-4-a, Y-4-b, later GR-12a, GR-12b
- Numbers: 900–908
- Locale: Newfoundland
- Last run: 1986
- Disposition: 3 preserved, 6 scrapped

The NF110 is a diesel-electric locomotive built by General Motors Diesel for narrow gauge service with the Canadian National Railways in Newfoundland (see: Newfoundland Railway). Only nine examples were built between 1952 and 1953, although thirty-eight identical NF210s were later built. The last examples were retired in 1986 and afterwards three examples were preserved in non-operating condition, all located in Newfoundland. A way to identify the difference between the NF110 and NF210 is that the NF110 has the bigger headlight housing on either end.

== Fleet details ==
Key:	Preserved	Scrapped

Road Number	Serial Number	Build date	GM Order number	1st CN Class	2nd CN Class	Retired	Notes
900	A303	December 1952	C-131	Y-4-a	GR-12a		Preserved Clarenville, NL
901	A304	December 1952	C-131	Y-4-a	GR-12a		
902	A305	December 1952	C-131	Y-4-a	GR-12a		Preserved Lewisporte, NL
903	A435	January 1953	C-153	Y-4-b	GR-12b		
904	A436	January 1953	C-153	Y-4-b	GR-12b		
905	A437	January 1953	C-153	Y-4-b	GR-12b		
906	A438	February 1953	C-153	Y-4-b	GR-12b		Preserved St.John's, NL
907	A439	February 1953	C-153	Y-4-b	GR-12b		
908	A440	February 1953	C-153	Y-4-b	GR-12b		

== See also ==
- List of GMD Locomotives
