= Bull Lake (Fox Creek) =

Lake in Kenora District, Ontario, Canada

- Location within Ontario
- Location: Kenora District, Ontario
- Coordinates: 49°21′16″N 91°34′29″W
- Primary outflows: Fox Creek to Cow Lake
- Basin countries: Canada
- Max. length: 0.5 km (0.31 mi)
- Max. width: 0.2 km (0.12 mi)
- Surface elevation: 358 m (1,175 ft)

Bull Lake is a lake in Kenora District, Ontario, Canada. It is about 500 metres (1,640 ft) long and 200 metres (656 ft) wide, and lies at an elevation of 358 metres (1,175 ft) about 9 kilometres (5.6 mi) southeast of the community of Ignace. The primary outflow is Fox Creek to Cow Lake, and further through Fox Lake to Agimak Lake on the Agimak River.

== See also ==
- List of lakes in Ontario
