= Bull Lake (Turner Township, Ontario) =

Lake in Sudbury District, Ontario, Canada

- Location within Ontario
- Location: Sudbury District, Ontario
- Coordinates: 47°06′11″N 80°34′57″W
- Primary outflows: Unnamed creek to Seagram Lake
- Basin countries: Canada
- Max. length: 2.3 km (1.4 mi)
- Max. width: 0.86 km (0.53 mi)
- Surface elevation: 324 m (1,063 ft)

Bull Lake is a lake in geographic Turner Township in Sudbury District, Ontario, Canada. It is about 2,300 metres (7,546 ft) long and 860 metres (2,822 ft) wide, and lies at an elevation of 324 metres (1,063 ft) about 46 kilometres (29 mi) northeast of the community of Capreol and 62 kilometres (39 mi) west of the community of Temagami. The primary outflow is an unnamed creek to an unnamed lake on the Yorston River, a tributary of the Sturgeon River, between Long Lake upstream and Seagram Lake downstream. Little Bull Lake is immediately upstream of Bull Lake, and is connected by a short unnamed stream.

A second Bull Lake in Sudbury District that is also part of the watershed of the same Sturgeon River, Bull Lake (Sheppard Township), lies 22 kilometres (14 mi) south.
