= GMD NF210 =

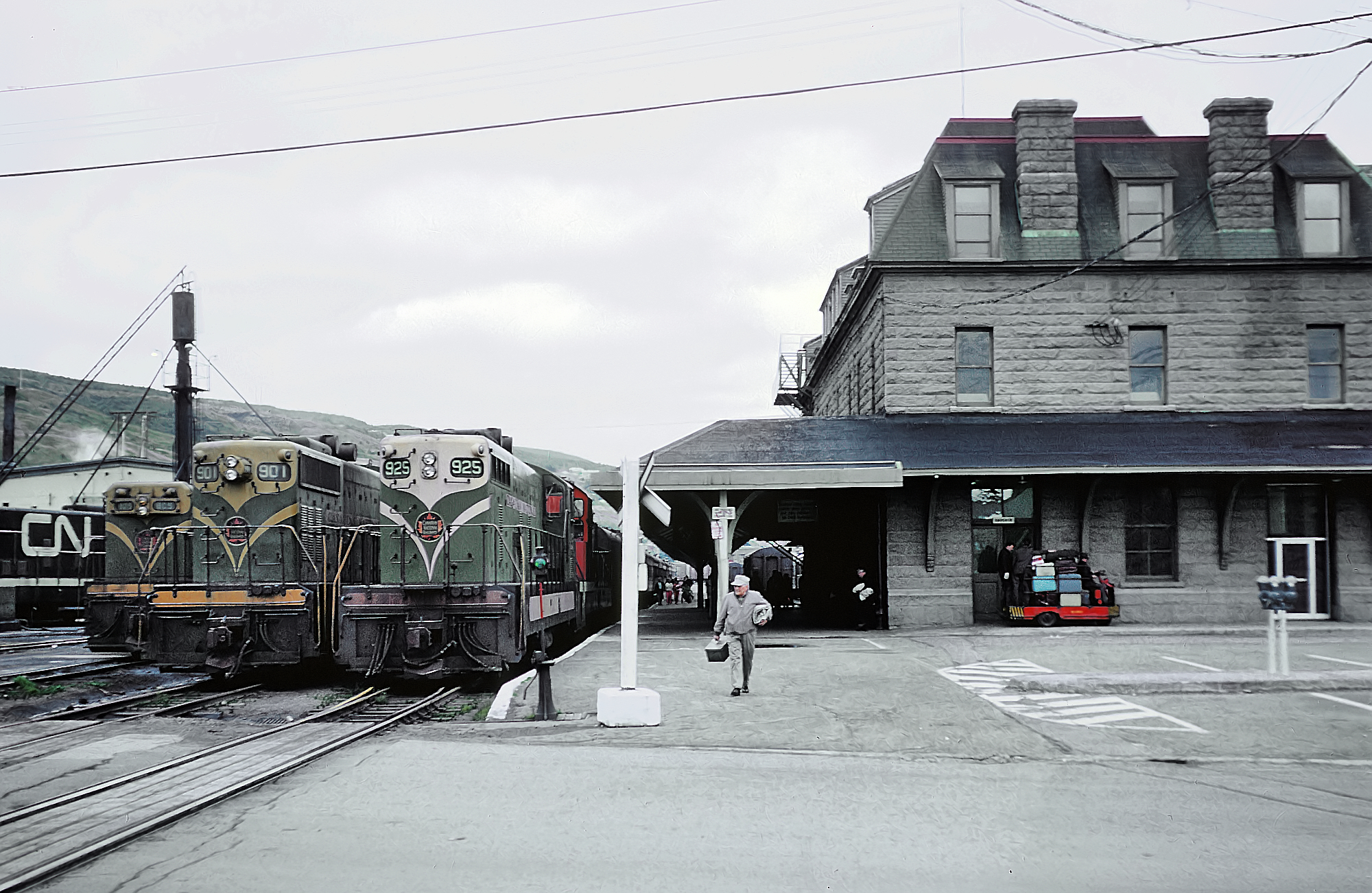
- Canadian National Railways NF210s on 25 August 1968
Type and origin
- Power type: Diesel-electric
- Builder: General Motors Diesel
- Order number: GMD C-207, C246 and C-271
- Serial number: A897–A922, A1450–1452, A1834–A1842
- Model: NF210
- Build date: 1956, 1958, 1960
- Total produced: 38
Specifications
- Configuration
  - AAR: C-C
  - UIC: Co′Co′
- Gauge: 3 ft 6 in (1,067 mm)
- Trucks: EMD Flexicoil
- Minimum curve: Alone: 23° 250.79 ft (76.44 m)
- Wheelbase: 42 ft 2 in (12.85 m)
- Length: 55 ft 2 1/2 in (16.83 m)
- Width: 10 ft 3 1/2 in (3.14 m)
- Height: 15 ft 4 in (4.67 m)
- Loco weight: 215,240–227,735 lb (97,631–103,299 kg) or 107.62–113.87 short tons (96.09–101.67 long tons; 97.63–103.30 t)
- Fuel type: Diesel fuel
- Fuel capacity: 900 imp gal (4,090 L; 1,080 US gal)
- Lubricant cap.: 137 imp gal (620 L; 165 US gal)
- Coolant cap.: 185 imp gal (840 L; 222 US gal)
- Sandbox cap.: 25 cu ft (0.71 m^{3})
- Prime mover: EMD 12-567C
- RPM range: 275–800
- Generator: EMD D-15-B
- Traction motors: EMD D-19 (C-271: D-29), 6 off
- MU working: Yes
- Train heating: None
- Loco brake: Air
- Train brakes: Air, schedule 6-SL
Performance figures
- Maximum speed: 60 mph (97 km/h)
- Power output: 1,200 hp (890 kW)
- Tractive effort: Starting: 68,000 lbf (302.5 kN), Continuous: 40,800 lbf (181.5 kN)
Career
- Operators: Canadian National Railways
- Class: GR-12g, GR-12p, GR-12x
- Numbers: 909–946
- Locale: Newfoundland
- Delivered: 1956
- First run: 1956
- Last run: 1990
- Retired: 1967–1990
- Preserved: 6 preserved
- Disposition: 21 exported, 6 preserved, 11 scrapped

The NF210 is a diesel-electric locomotive built by General Motors Diesel for service with Canadian National Railways narrow gauge network on the island of Newfoundland (see Newfoundland Railway and Terra Transport).

The design was based on the earlier NF110 locomotives, also built for CNR in Newfoundland. The engines were some of the very few 3 ft 6 in (1,067 mm) narrow gauge locomotives in North America. Thirty-eight were built between 1956 and 1960. The last examples were retired in 1990 and afterwards six example were preserved across Newfoundland. Eleven examples were exported to Chile, eight to Nicaragua, and two to Nigeria.

== Preservation ==
One of the preserved locomotives number 931, located in Corner Brook still has its diesel engine intact, all of the others had their engines removed prior to being put on display. The engine in 931 used to be started and the engine moved up and down the short section of track at the museum. However the engine is now a static display like the rest, although it still retains its engine.

== Fleet details ==
Key:	Preserved	Scrapped	Exported

Road number	Serial number	Build date	GM order number	CN class	Retired	Notes
909	A897	August 1956	C-207	GR-12g		
910	A898	August 1956	C-207	GR-12g	November 1988	Exported to Chile
911	A899	August 1956	C-207	GR-12g	November 1988	Exported to Chile
912	A900	August 1956	C-207	GR-12g	April 1967	Wrecked Corner Brook, Newfoundland and Labrador, September 1966
913	A901	August 1956	C-207	GR-12g	May 1988	
914	A902	August 1956	C-207	GR-12g		
915	A903	August 1956	C-207	GR-12g	November 1988	Exported to Chile
916	A904	August 1956	C-207	GR-12g	November 1988	Exported to Chile
917	A905	September 1956	C-207	GR-12g		
918	A906	September 1956	C-207	GR-12g		Exported to Nicaragua 1989 (FCN 908), to SQM in Chile in 1994
919	A907	September 1956	C-207	GR-12g		
920	A908	September 1956	C-207	GR-12g	April 1967	Wrecked Corner Brook, Newfoundland and Labrador September, 1966
921	A909	September 1956	C-207	GR-12g	November 1988	Exported to Chile
922	A910	September 1956	C-207	GR-12g	June 1989	Exported to Nicaragua (FCN 901)
923	A911	September 1956	C-207	GR-12g		
924	A912	September 1956	C-207	GR-12g		Preserved Bishop's Falls, Newfoundland and Labrador
925	A913	September 1956	C-207	GR-12g		Preserved Avondale, Newfoundland and Labrador
926	A914	October 1956	C-207	GR-12g		Exported to Chile
927	A915	October 1956	C-207	GR-12g		Exported to Nigeria, presumed scrapped
928	A916	October 1956	C-207	GR-12g	June 1989	Exported to Nicaragua in 1989, to FCAB in Chile in 1994
929	A917	October 1956	C-207	GR-12g	November 1988	Exported to Chile
930	A918	October 1956	C-207	GR-12g		
931	A919	October 1956	C-207	GR-12g		Preserved Corner Brook, Newfoundland.
932	A920	October 1956	C-207	GR-12g		Preserved Bonavista, Newfoundland and Labrador
933	A921	October 1956	C-207	GR-12g		Exported to Chile
934	A922	October 1956	C-207	GR-12g		Preserved Channel-Port aux Basques, Newfoundland and Labrador
935	A1450	March 1958	C-246	GR-12p		
936	A1451	March 1958	C-246	GR-12p	November 1988	Exported to Chile
937	A1452	March 1958	C-246	GR-12p		
938	A1834	January 1960	C-271	GR-12x	June 1989	Exported to Nicaragua in 1989, to FCAB in Chile in 1994
939	A1835	January 1960	C-271	GR-12x	June 1989	Exported to Nicaragua in 1989 (FCN 904), to FCAB in Chile in 1994
940	A1836	January 1960	C-271	GR-12x		Preserved Whitbourne, Newfoundland and Labrador
941	A1837	January 1960	C-271	GR-12x	June 1989	Exported to Nicaragua in 1989 (FCN 905), to FCAB in Chile in 1994
942	A1838	January 1960	C-271	GR-12x	June 1989	Exported to Nicaragua in 1989, to FCAB in Chile in 1994
943	A1839	January 1960	C-271	GR-12x		Exported to Nigeria, presumed scrapped
944	A1840	January 1960	C-271	GR-12x	November 1988	Exported to Chile
945	A1841	January 1960	C-271	GR-12x	November 1988	Exported to Chile
946	A1842	January 1960	C-271	GR-12x		Exported to Nicaragua in 1989 (FCN 907), to FCAB in Chile in 1994

== See also ==
- Newfoundland Railway
- List of GMD Locomotives
