= Capreol =

Coordinates: 46°42′21″N 80°55′17″W

- Community (Dissolved town)
- Town of Capreol
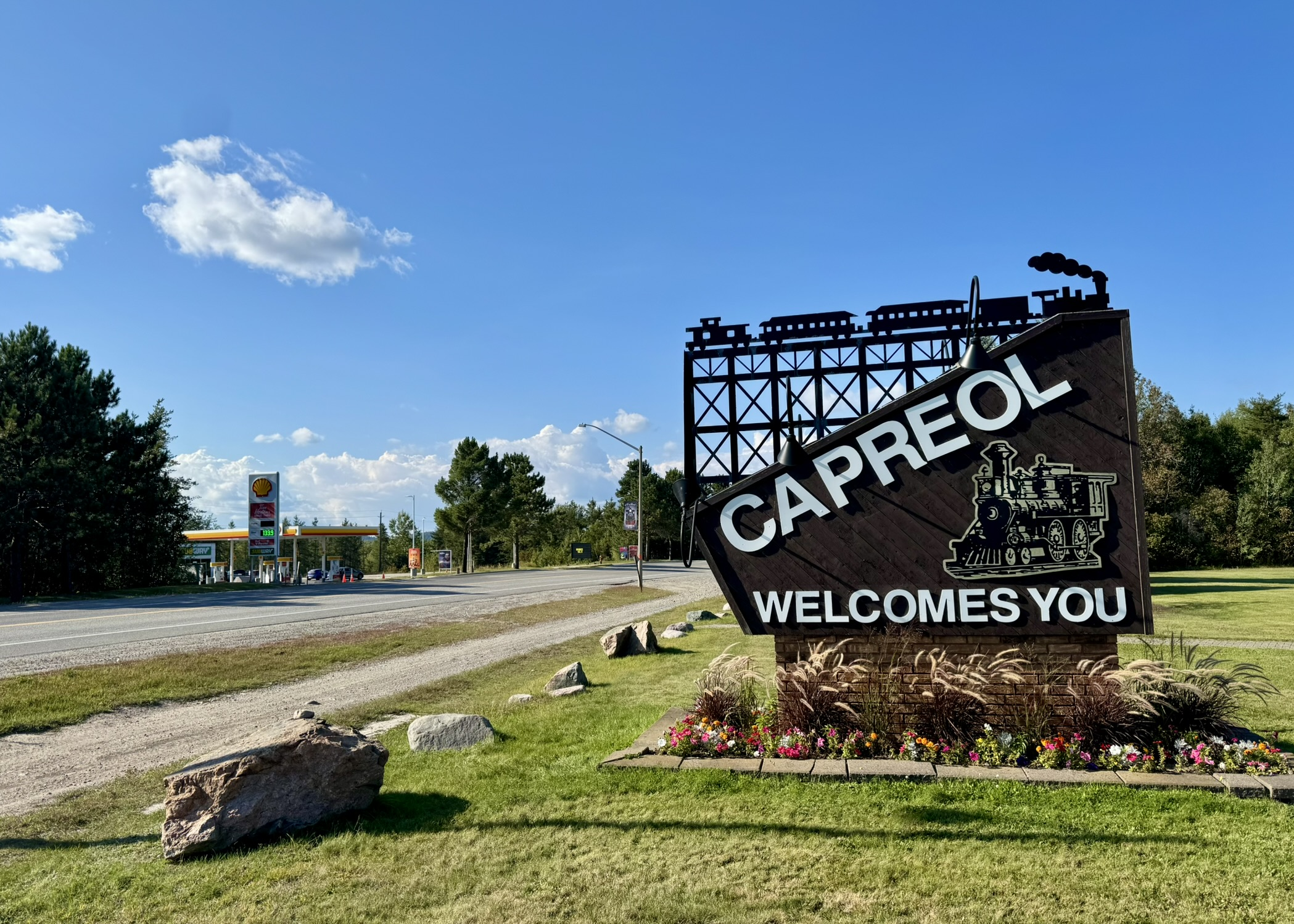
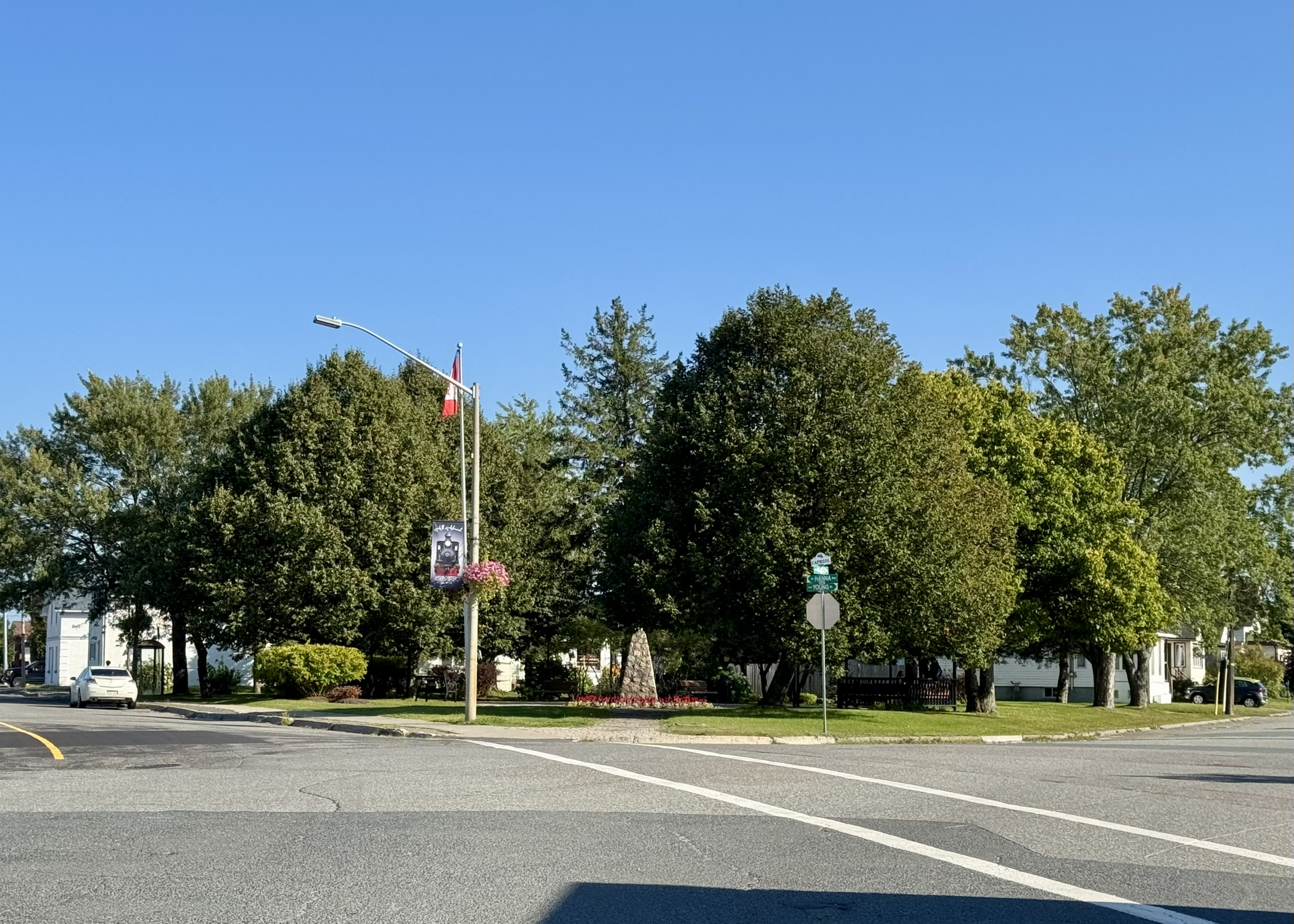
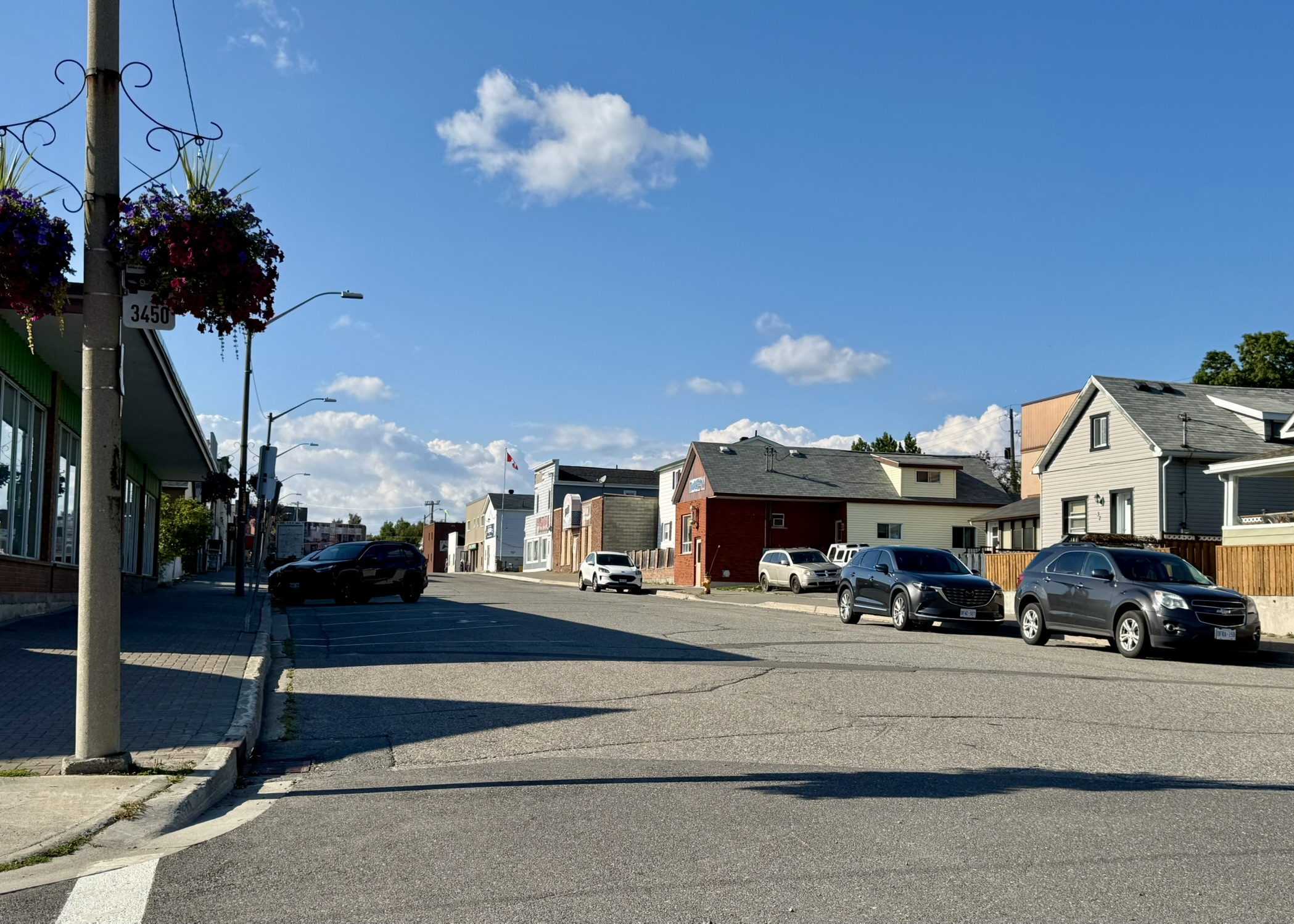
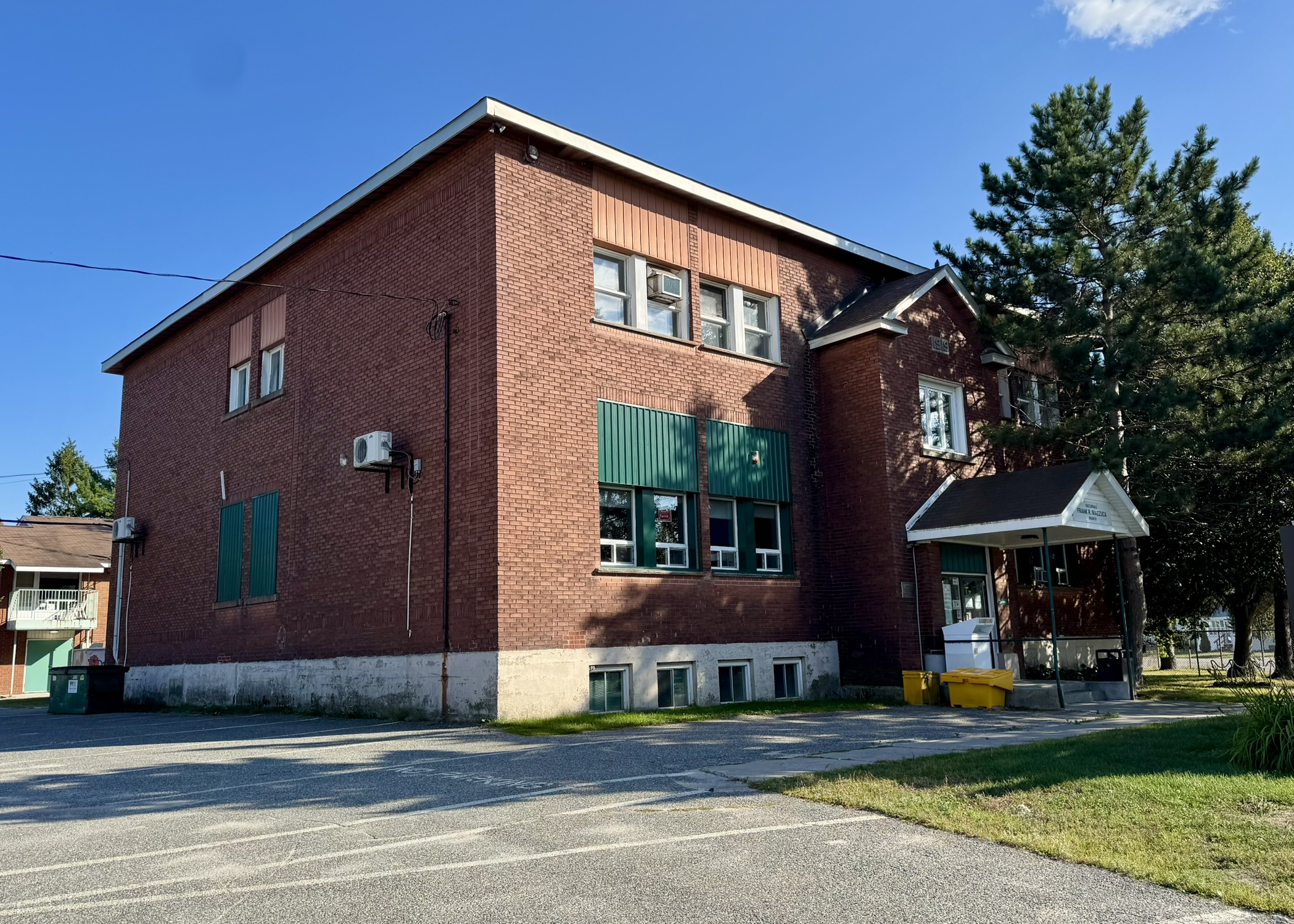
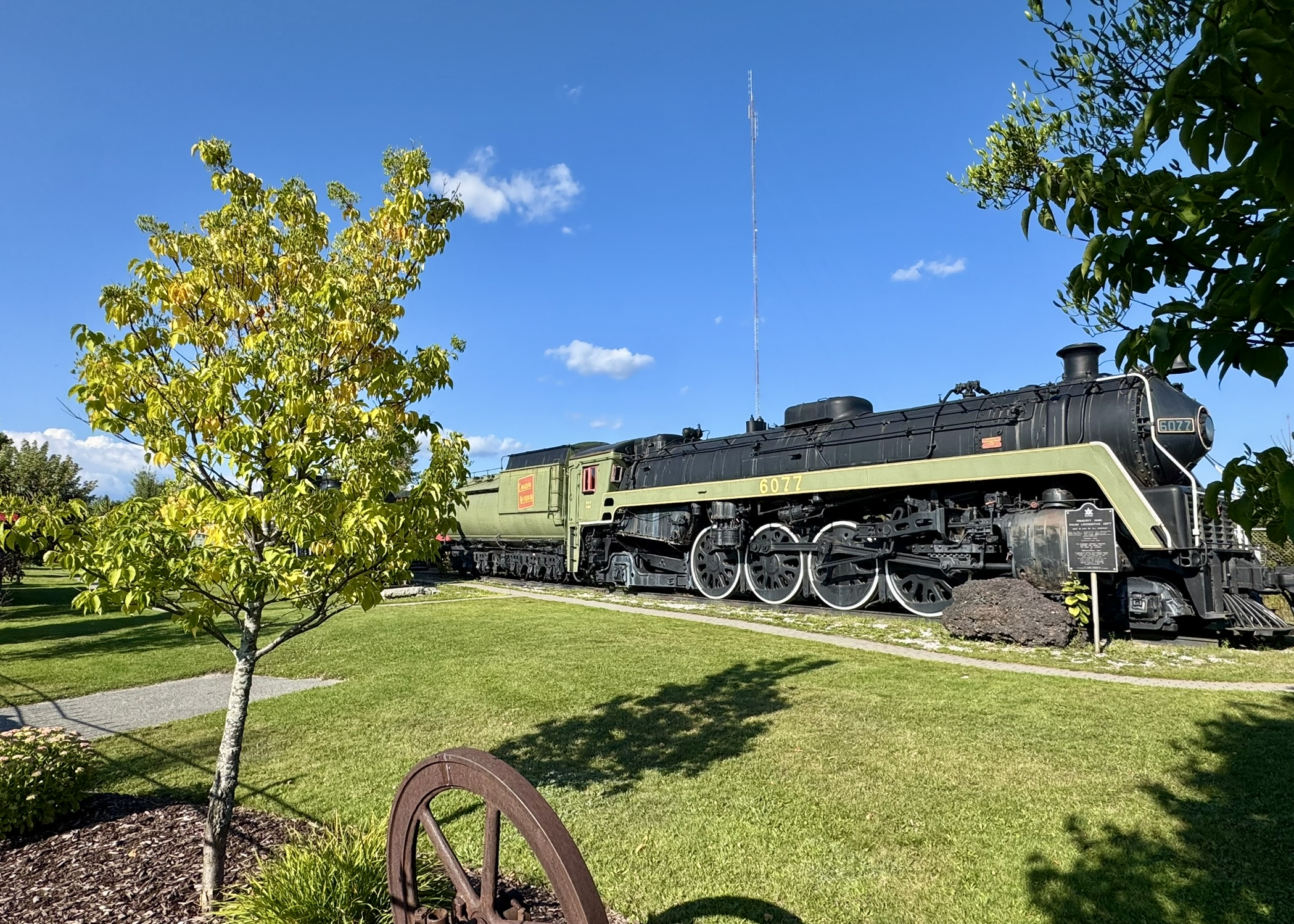
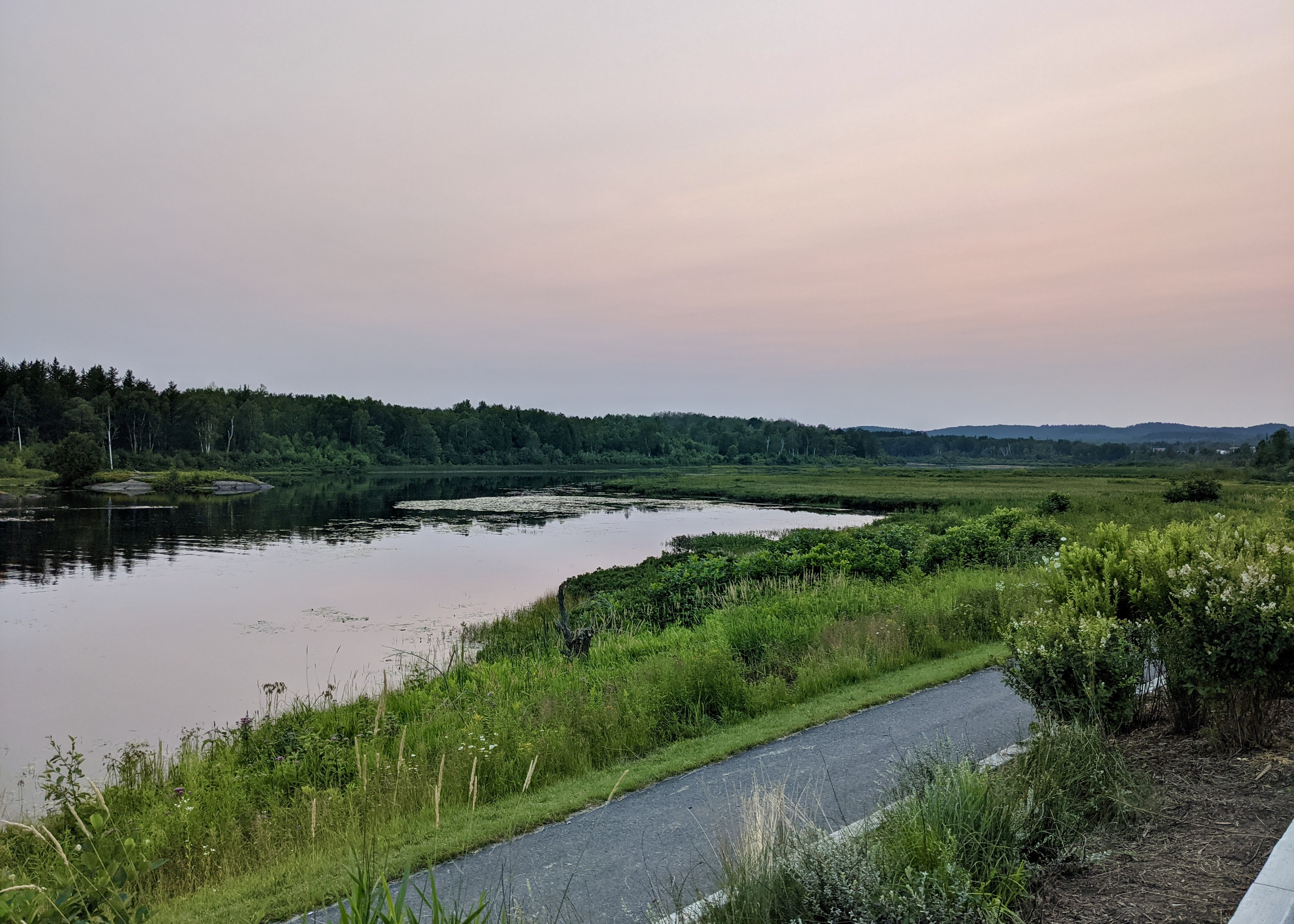
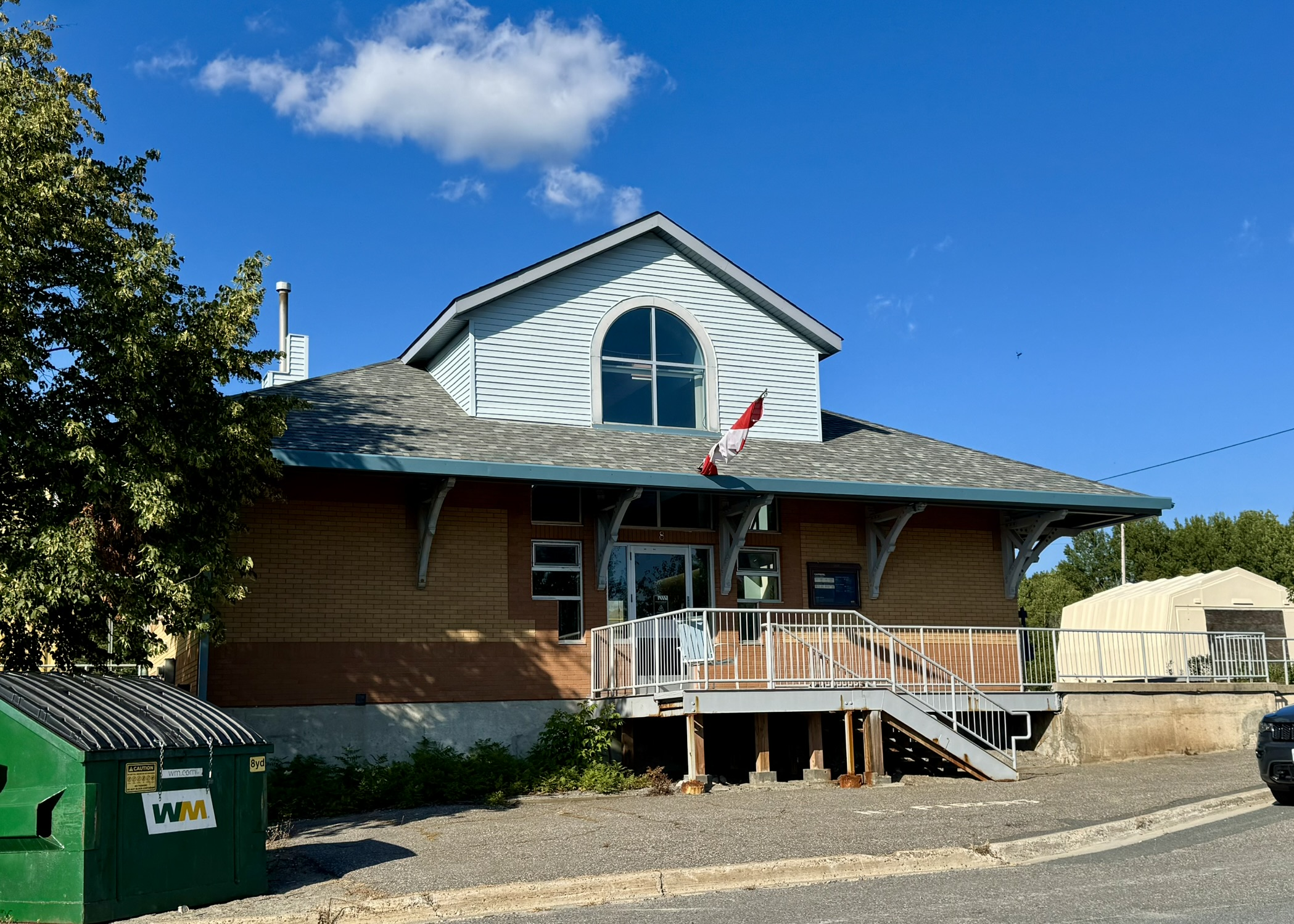
- Capreol Welcome Sign Centennial Park Downtown Capreol Capreol Public Library Prescott Park Vermillion River Capreol Station

- Location of Capreol (red) compared to the rest of the Sudbury Region until 2000.
- Country: Canada
- Province: Ontario
- City: Greater Sudbury
- Ward: 7
- Incorporated: April 1, 1918

Government
  - City Councillor: Natalie Labbée
  - Governing Body: Greater Sudbury City Council
  - MP: Jim Belanger (Conservative)
  - MPP: France Gélinas (NDP)

Population (2021)
  - Total: 2,919
  - Density: 1,294.2/km^{2} (3,352/sq mi)
- Time zone: UTC−5 (EST)
  - Summer (DST): UTC−4 (EDT)
- Postal Code FSA: P0M 1H0
- Area code: 705

Capreol (/ˈkeɪpriɒl/ KAY-pree-ol) is a community in the city of Greater Sudbury, Ontario, Canada. Situated on the Vermilion River, Capreol is the northernmost community in the city.

Capreol was founded in 1918 and became part of the Regional Municipality of Sudbury in 1973. It was an independent municipality until 2000, when the lower-tier municipalities of the Regional Municipality of Sudbury were amalgamated into the newly created single-tier city of Greater Sudbury.

== History ==
The town was named after the Township of Capreol, which was surveyed in 1893. It was named for Frederick Chase Capreol, a businessman and promoter of the Northern Railway of Canada.

The Northern Railway reached Capreol in 1906, with the current alignment being completed by 1911. By 1915, Capreol became a Divisional point of the railway with the completion of the station and roundhouse. By 1918, the population had grown to approximately 500 people. The town was incorporated on April 1, 1918.

With the creation of the Canadian National Railway in 1923, rail transport continued to be the primary industry of the town. In 1921, a YMCA was constructed to address housing shortages. Water, sewage, and telephone services arrived by 1930.

With the continued growth of the nearby city of Sudbury, Capreol became part of the Regional Municipality of Sudbury in 1973. In 1993, the Northern Ontario Railroad Museum and Heritage Centre was established. It was formed around Prescott Park, which was created in 1967 when CN Rail donated a Canadian National Class U-1-f steam locomotive to the town.

In 2000, Capreol ceased to be an independent municipality, and became a part of Greater Sudbury.

== Sports ==
From 1978 to 1986, Capreol had a Northern Ontario Junior Hockey League team called the Capreol Hawks, who won the league title in 1980-81.

== Ghost towns ==
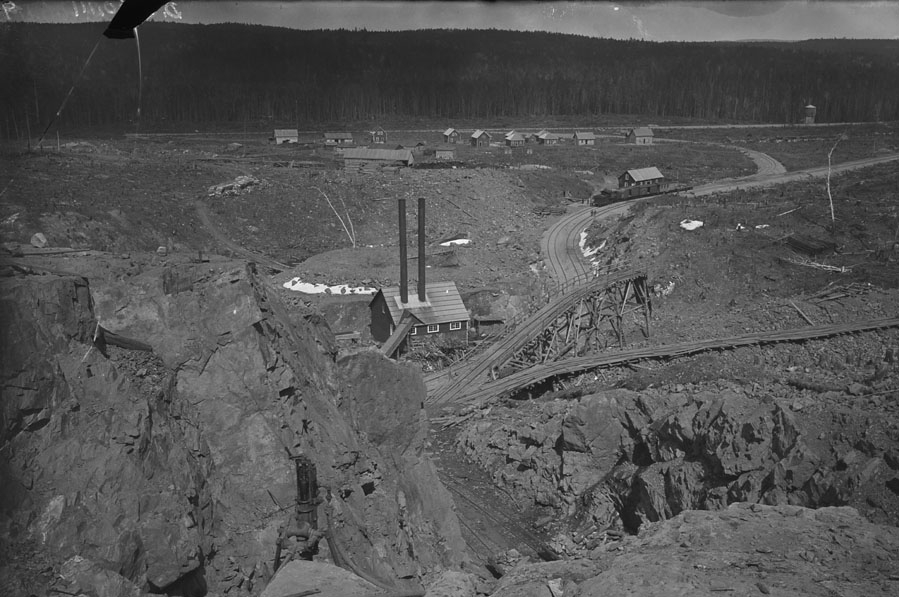
Moose Mountain Mine at Sellwood, c. 1900s

Two former settlements existed within the boundaries of Capreol, Sellwood and Milnet. Both settlements were unincorporated, and based around the resource industry.

Milnet was a small settlement established in the early 1900s around the lumber industry. A sawmill and planar mill were constructed to serve logging camps upstream on the Vermilion River. In 1933 the sawmill burned down, and the planar mill met the same fate in 1934. Several homes remain at the site.

Sellwood was a company town settled around 1901 by John W. Gates and Associates after the discovery of iron deposits at Moose Mountain. By 1915, mining operations began slowing down, and the settlement had become a ghost town. The town sat vacant until 1959, when the structures were demolished to construct an open-pit mine. These operations, later operated by National Steel, brought iron ore south to Depot Harbour for shipment to its plants in Detroit. Operations ceased in 1979.

== Notable residents ==
- Jean Robert Beaulé, politician
- Fred Boimistruck, NHL hockey player
- Joffre Desilets, NHL hockey player
- Norman Fawcett, politician
- Pete Horeck, NHL hockey player
- Elie Martel, politician
- Rob MacDonald, mixed martial artist
- Shelley Martel, politician
- Frank Mazzuca Sr., politician
- Mike Miron, lacrosse player
- Doug Mohns, NHL hockey player
- Allan Patterson, politician
- Donald Bartlett Reid, politician
- Barbara Tyson, actress
- Shania Twain, musician

== See also ==
- Northern Ontario Railroad Museum
- Capreol station
- List of population centres in Ontario
