= Davenport railway station =

Davenport railway station may refer to:

- Davenport railway station (England), in Stockport, Greater Manchester, United Kingdom
- Davenport station (Ontario), a former station in Toronto, Canada

== See also ==
- Davenport (disambiguation)
