= VIA FP9ARM =

Diesel–electric locomotive

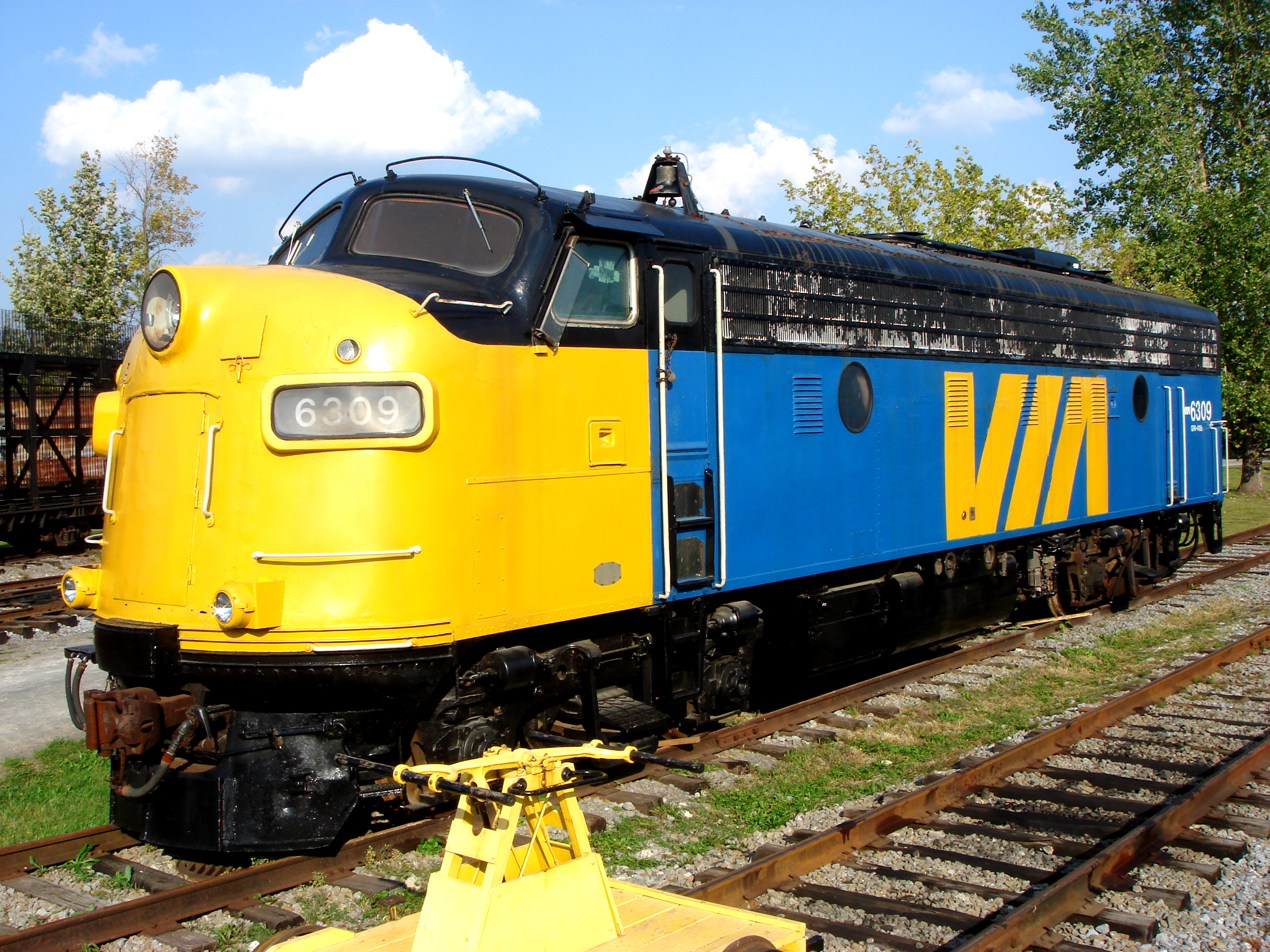
- Via FP9ARM #6309 undergoing restoration at the Canadian Railway Museum in Saint-Constant, Quebec (September 2007)
Type and origin
- Power type: Diesel-electric
- Builder: CN Rail (GMD)
- Model: FP9ARM
Specifications
- Configuration
  - AAR: B-B
- Gauge: 4 ft 8 1/2 in (1,435 mm) standard gauge
- Length: 54 ft 8 in (16.66 m)
- Prime mover: EMD 645C
- Engine type: V16 diesel
- Cylinders: 16
Performance figures
- Power output: 1,800 hp (1,300 kW)
Career
- Locale: North America

The Via Rail FP9ARM is a re-manufactured version of a GMD FP9A diesel passenger locomotive, rebuilt between 1983 and 1985 by Canadian National Railways at their Pointe St-Charles shops.

== History ==
In the early 1980s, Via Rail was experiencing reliability issues with its motive power. Although an order for new GMD F40PHs was anticipated, interim improvements were necessary to maintain service levels on its routes. Via Rail had a surplus of steam-heated GMD Via FP9A units built in the 1950s and so fifteen of these units were chosen to be re-manufactured. The first twelve units, 6300–6311, were re-manufactured at the CN Pointe St-Charles shops in Montreal while the final three, 6312–6314, were re-manufactured at the CN shops in Moncton, New Brunswick. As part of the re-manufacturing many original components were replaced or upgraded - the original 16-567C engines were rebuilt with 645E series power assemblies, and the Woodward governor was revised, thereby raising the net power for traction from 1,750 to 1,800 hp (1,300 to 1,340 kW).

The first five, re-manufactured in 1983 and early 1984, were outshopped without steam generators and became Via Rail class GPA-418a while the remainder, re-manufactured with Vapor steam generators in mid-1984 to mid-1985, became Via Rail class GPA-418b.

By 1997 Via Rail had retired virtually all of its older steam-heated rolling stock. It was felt that many of the FP9ARMs were still usable, and some of the units had their steam generators and associated piping removed and were retrofitted with head end power alternators. 6300, 6302, 6304, 6307, 6308, 6311, and 6313 all had this done, with the remainder of the units put into storage.

All units were retired and stricken from the active roster upon the completion of delivery of the 900-series P42DCs in late 2001.

== Operations ==
After rebuilding, the FP9ARM units could be found in service across Canada.

In later years the locomotives were used on services in Northern Manitoba and in Northern Quebec. Their use on these lines allowed for the GMD Via F40PH-2 previously used on these lines to be transferred to other duties. They remained on these lines until retirement.

== Accidents ==
- The 6300 was the only locomotive to survive the Hinton train collision on February 8, 1986, which also involved FP7 #6566 and F9 #6633 of the Via Rail No. 4 train, and CN GP38-2(W) #5586 and SD40's #5104 and #5062 of the Canadian National Railway No. 413 westbound freight train. Following the accident, 6300 was rebuilt with the cab of a former Kansas City Southern F7 and returned to service.
- The 6310 and 6314 were both wrecked in 1993.

== Preservation ==
The FP9ARMs that were not wrecked and scrapped have survived into preservation.

- 6300 was used by Via Rail as a shop switcher in Vancouver, BC until being donated to the BC chapter of the National Railway Historical Society. As of late 2019, it currently operates at Heber Valley Railroad.
- 6304 and 6311 are currently held under private ownership at the Alberta Railway Museum.
- 6309 has been loaned to the Canadian Railway Museum, located at Saint-Constant, Quebec.
- 6303 is owned and operational by the VIA Historical Association and was restored to its 1978 livery.
- 6305 and 6312 are in use by Ontario Southland Railway as number 6508 near Woodstock, ON, Canada and sees regular duty pulling trains from the CAMI GM Yard in Ingersoll, ON, Canada to the CP yard in Woodstock, ON, Canada.
- 6306 is preserved as CN 6520 at the Railway Museum of British Columbia in Squamish, British Columbia.
- 6307 and 6313 are currently owned and operated by the Canadian Pacific Railway as Canadian Pacific 4106 and 4107, part of the Royal Canadian Pacific tourist trains.
- 6302 and 6308 were sold to the Texas State Railroad where they were renumbered 125 and 126, respectively. Both have been restored into a vintage Missouri–Kansas–Texas Railroad "Texas Special" inspired paint scheme.
- 6301 remains on VIA property, stored at the Montreal Maintenance Centre.

== Fleet details ==
Key:	Preserved	Scrapped	Still with Via	Sold

Numbers
63xx	ex 65xx	Serial	Build date	Remanufactured	Notes
6300	6524	A1196	04/57	12/83	Donated to the BC chapter of the National Railway Historical Society in 2011. Shipped to Heber Valley Railroad in Utah.
6301	6534	A1394	05/58	12/83	Stored at the Montreal Maintenance Centre
6302	6533	A1393	05/58	12/83	Sold Georgia Southwestern Railroad. 6302 Now in service on the Texas State Railroad.
6303	6539	A1399	07/58	12/83	Sold Ontario Southland Railway 1400.Acquired by the VIA Historical Association in 2024 and restored to its 1978 livery.
6304	6509	A639	12/54	03/84	Sold IFE Leasing 6304. Privately owned and stored at Alberta Railway Museum.
6305	6508	A638	12/54	06/84	Sold Ontario Southland Railway 6508.
6306	6520	A1050	03/57	06/84	Operational West Coast Railway Association as CN 6520.
6307	6515	A1045	01/57	10/84	Sold Ohio Central Railroad 6307. Now in service with Canadian Pacific as #4106.
6308	6521	A1051	03/57	12/84	Sold Georgia Southwestern Railroad. 6308 Awaiting restoration on the Texas State Railroad.
6309	6528	A1200	05/57	12/84	Loaned to Exporail/Canadian Railway Museum.
6310	6532	A1204	05/57	12/84	Wrecked, 09/04/1993
6311	6529	A1201	05/57	12/84	Sold IFE Leasing 6311.Privately owned and stored at Alberta Railway Museum.
6312	6523	A1195	03/57	12/84	Sold Ontario Southland Railway 1401.
6313	6526	A1198	04/57	03/85	Sold Ohio Central Railroad 6313. Now in service with Canadian Pacific as #4107.
6314	6527	A1199	04/57	05/85	Wrecked, 09/04/1993

== Gallery ==
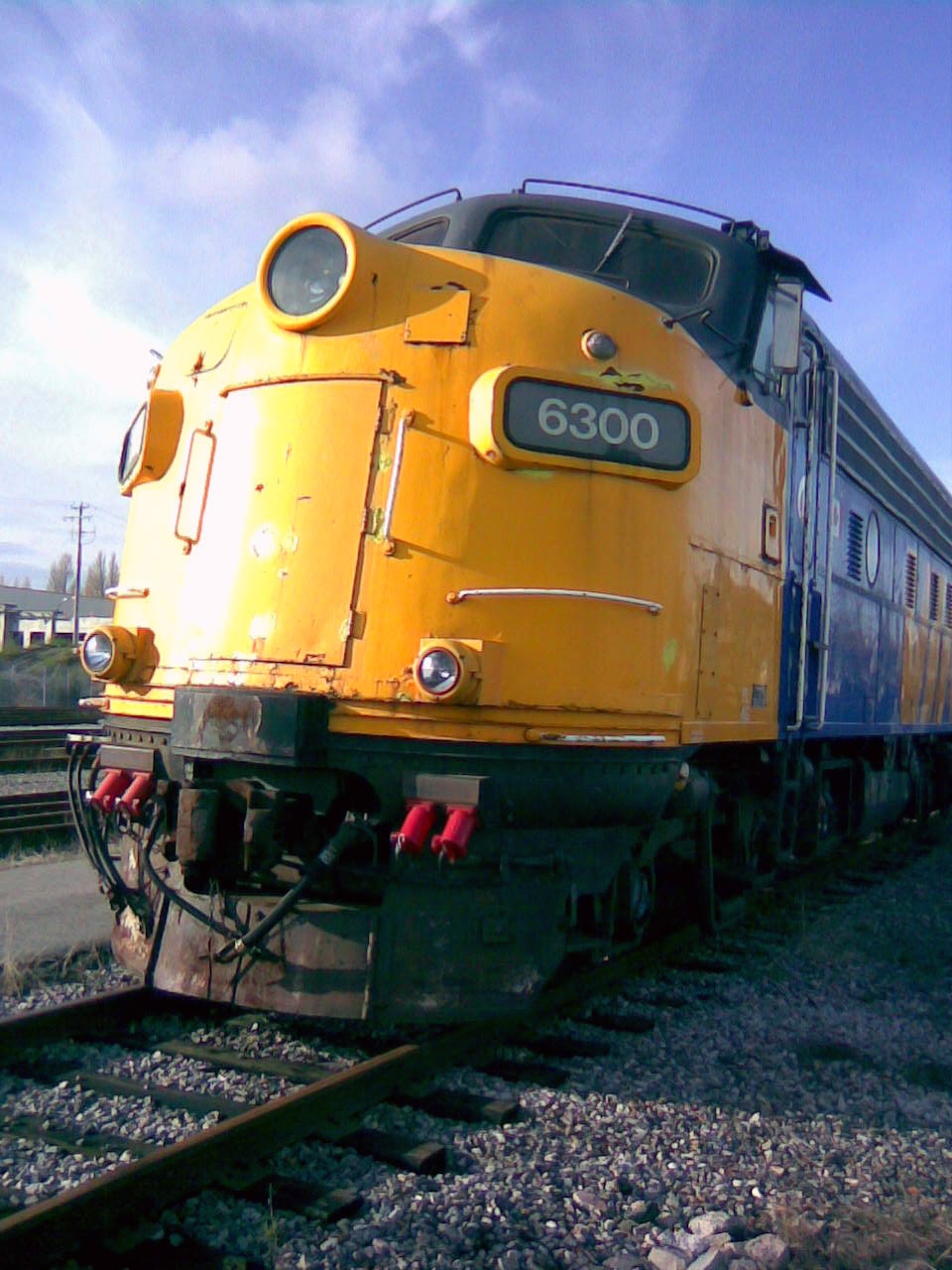
Via FP9ARM #6300 in Vancouver

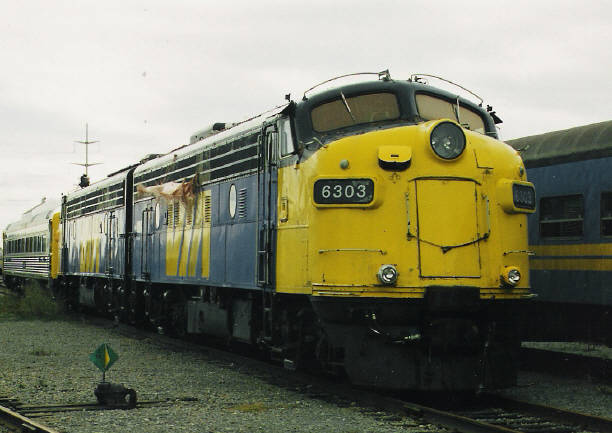
Via FP9ARM #6303 at the Montreal Maintenance Centre in Montreal, Quebec.

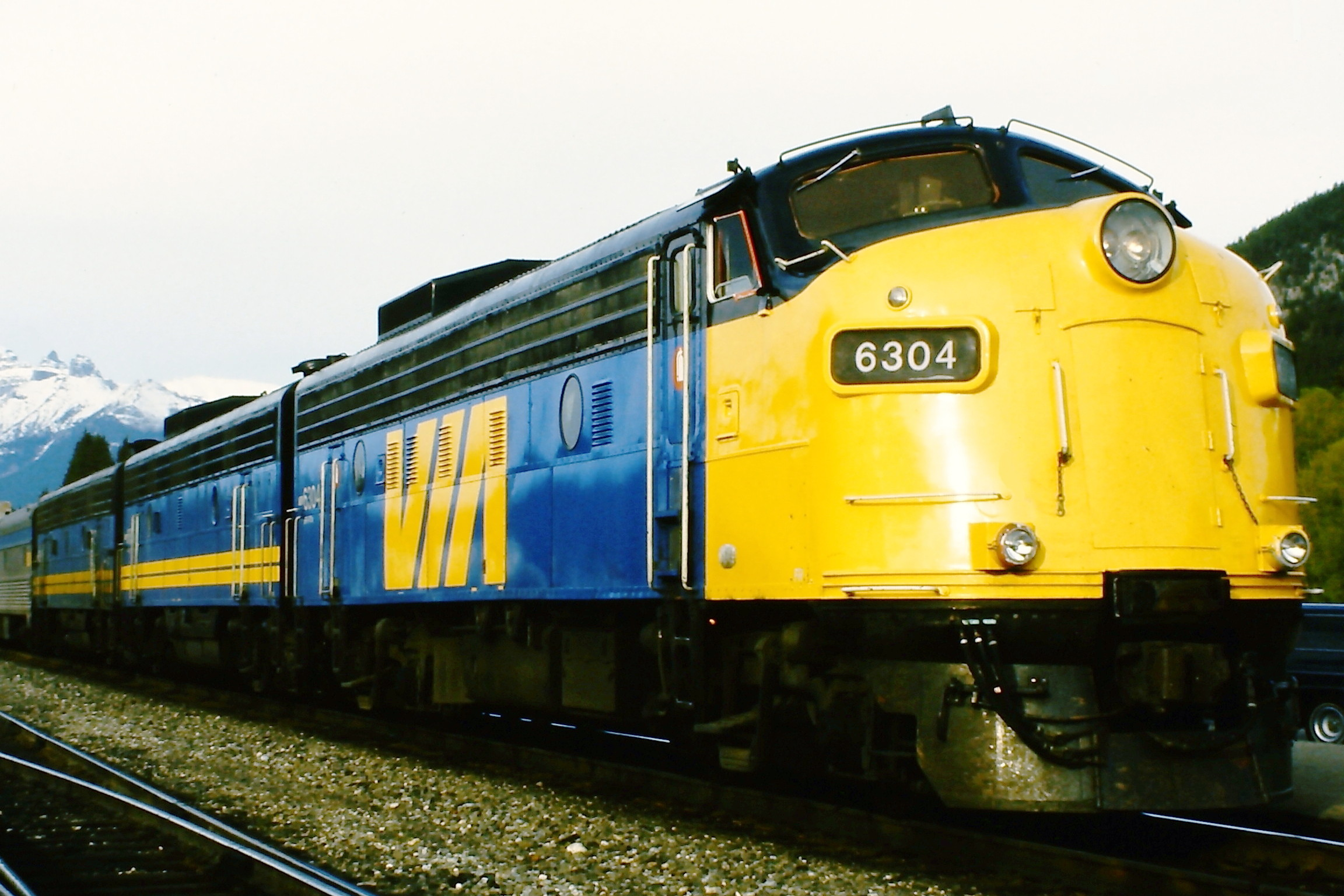
VIA #6304 in Banff

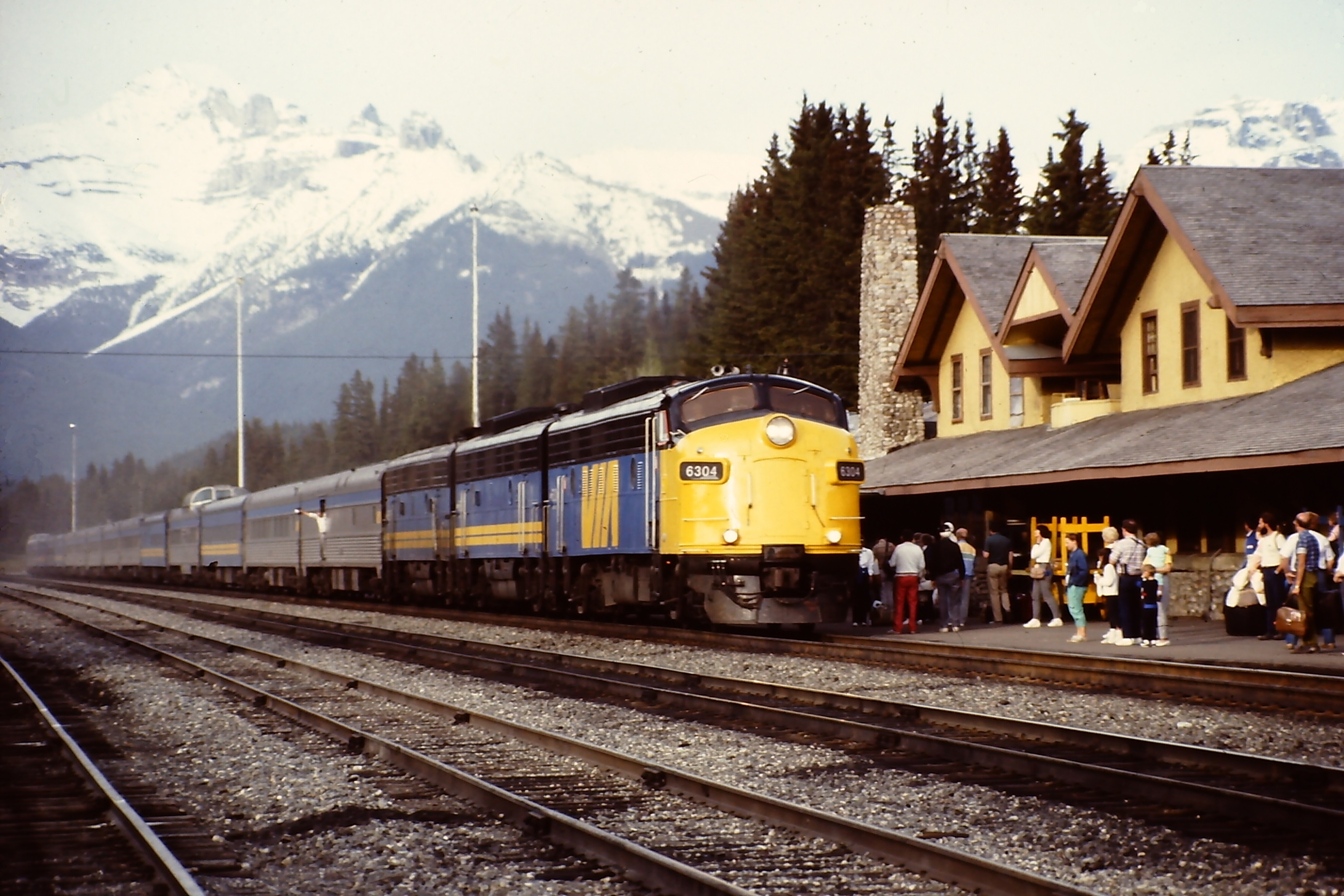
VIA #6304 with
The Canadian in Banff

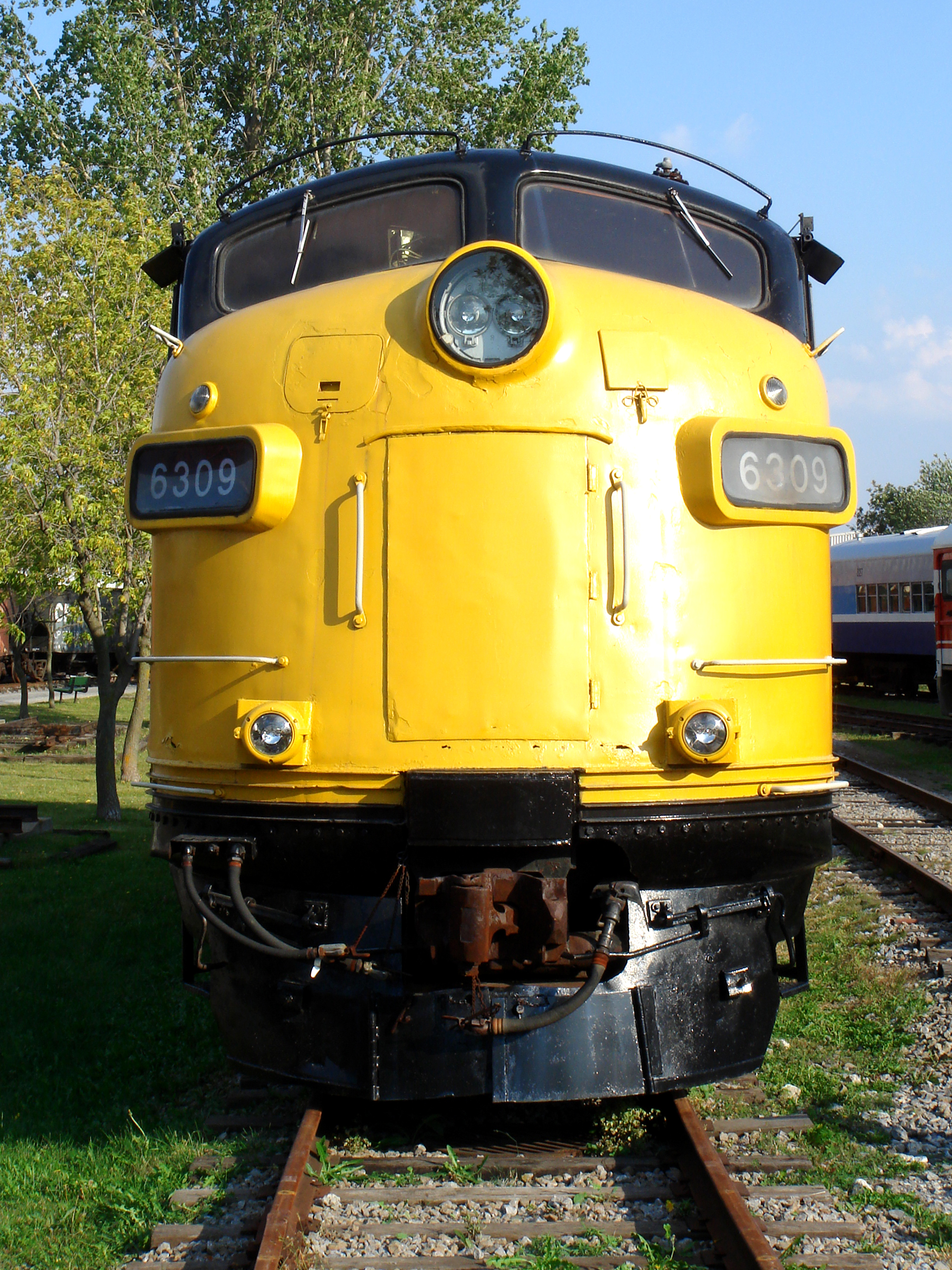
Via FP9ARM #6309 Nose Shot.

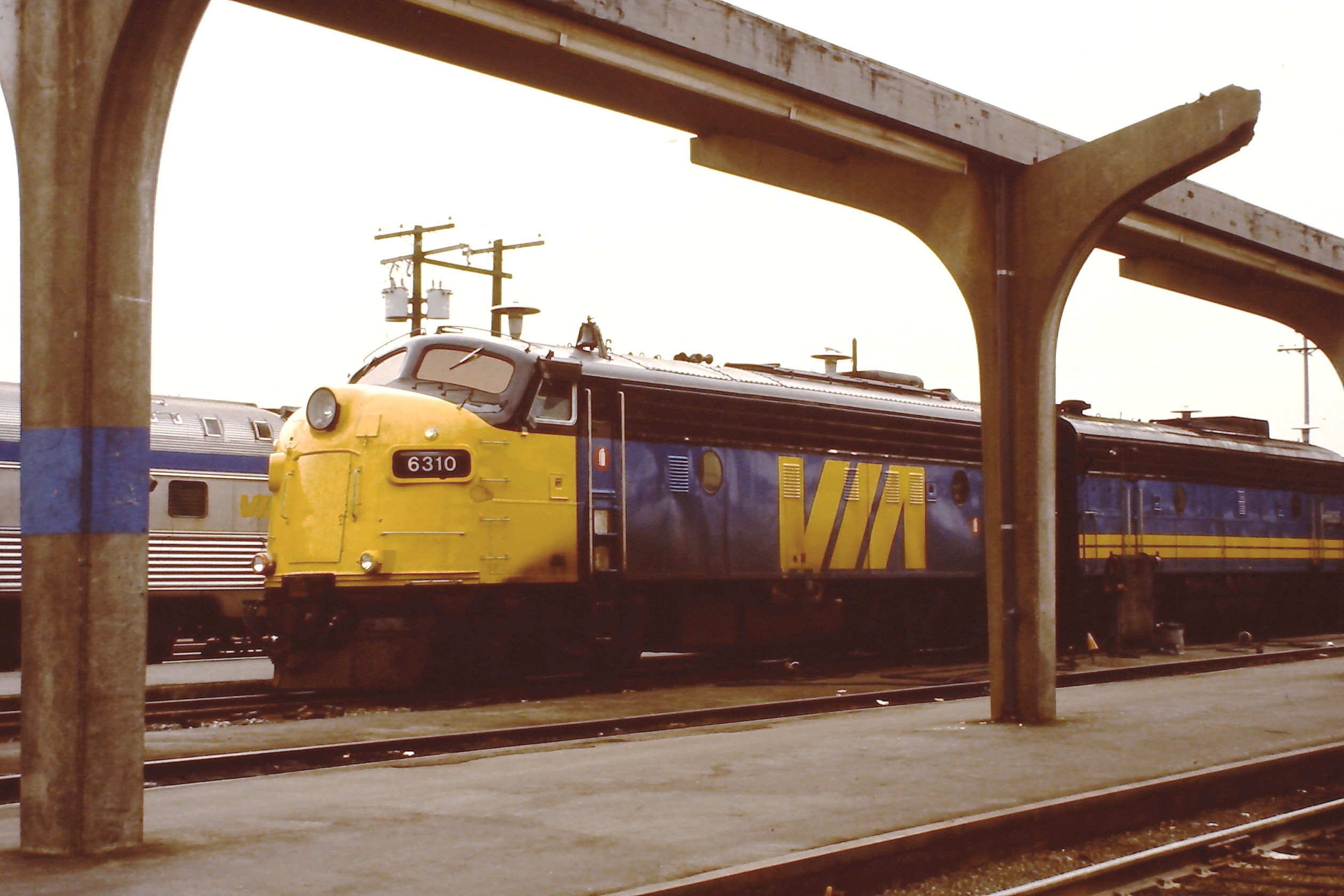
VIA #6310 in Vancouver

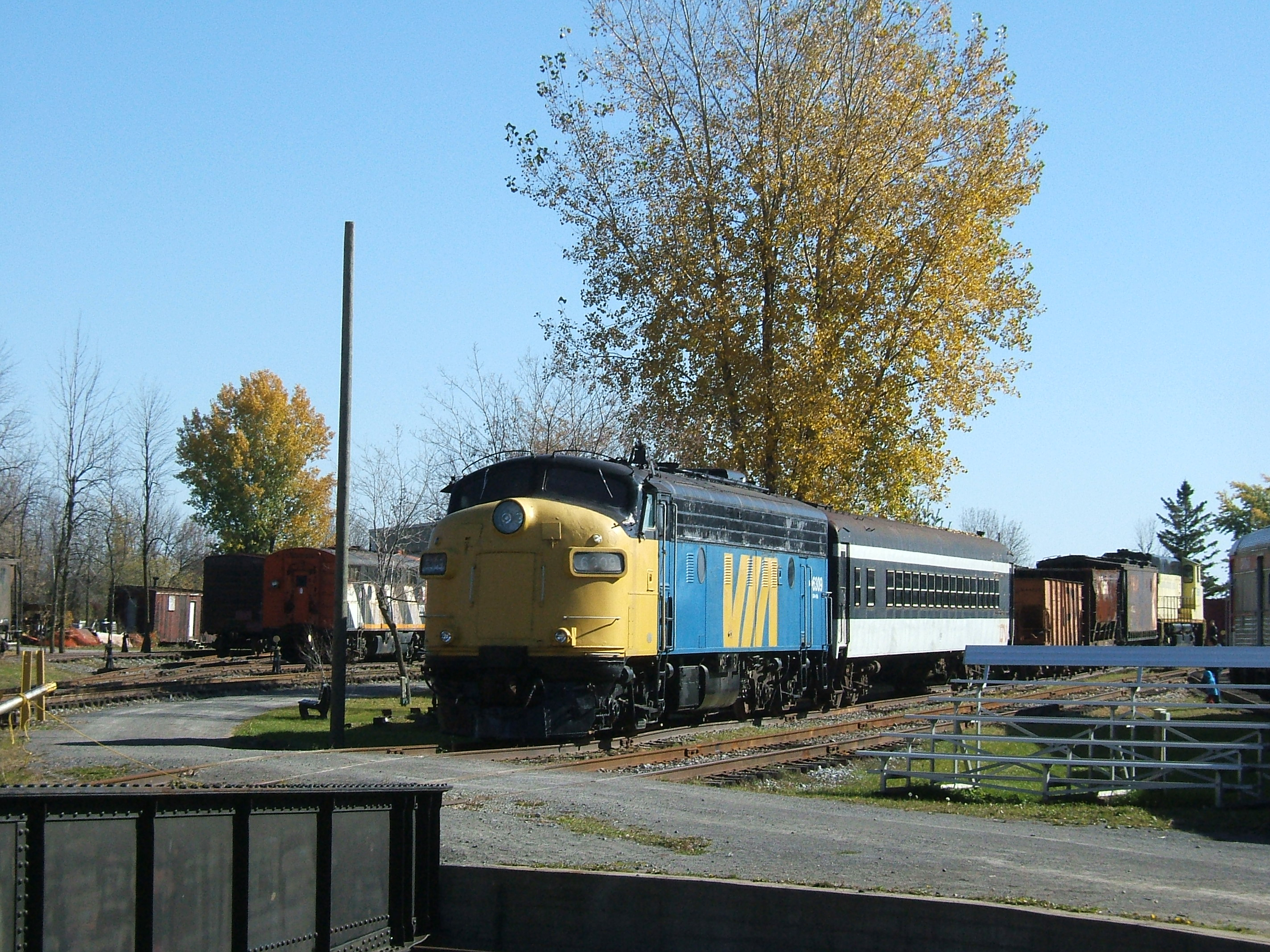
VIA #6309 at the Canadian Railway Museum

== See also ==
- List of GMD Locomotives
