= Davenport =

Davenport may refer to:

== Places ==
=== Australia ===
- Davenport, Northern Territory, a locality
- Hundred of Davenport, cadastral unit in South Australia
  - Davenport, South Australia, suburb of Port Augusta
  - District Council of Davenport, former local government area near Port Augusta
  - Corporate Town of Davenport, former local government municipality near Port Augusta
- Electoral district of Davenport, in South Australia
- Davenport, Western Australia, a suburb of Bunbury

=== Canada ===
- Davenport (federal electoral district), a federal electoral district
- Davenport (provincial electoral district), in Ontario
- Ward 9 Davenport, a city council ward in Toronto
- Davenport, Toronto, a neighbourhood and former village in Toronto
- Davenport Road, Toronto

=== United Kingdom ===
- Davenport, Cheshire, a hamlet near Congleton
- Davenport, Greater Manchester, an area of Stockport

=== United States ===
- Davenport, Iowa, the largest city of that name in the US
- Davenport, California
- Davenport, Florida
- Davenport, Nebraska
- Davenport, New York
  - Davenport Center, New York
- Davenport, North Dakota
- Davenport, Oklahoma
- Davenport, Virginia
- Davenport, Washington
- Davenport Creek, a stream in Utah
- Davenport Glacier, in North Cascades National Park, Washington
- Davenport Lake, a lake in Georgia
- Davenport Municipal Airport (Washington)
- Davenport Neck, a peninsula in New York

== People ==
- Davenport, originally Bromley-Davenport, a British family that settled in Cheshire
- Davenport (surname), a list of people with the name

=== Characters ===
- Achilles Davenport, a character from the video game Assassin's Creed III
- Davenport, the surname of several characters from the TV series Lab Rats
- Lucas Davenport, created by novelist John Sandford
- Lieutenant Colonel Alvin H. "Chopper" Davenport, a character from the video game Ace Combat 5: The Unsung War
- Ashley Davenport, a character in Revenge (TV series)
- Cooter Davenport, a character in the American TV series The Dukes of Hazzard
- Dave Davenport, a character from the online webcomic Narbonic
- Dawn Davenport, the main character played by Divine in the John Waters film Female Trouble
- Gemma Davenport, a character from British soap opera Coronation Street
- Henry Davenport, a character from the comedy series Drop the Dead Donkey
- Mrs. Davenport, a character from the animated cartoon Jimmy Neutron
- Davenport, a character from the McElroy family's podcast The Adventure Zone
- Hubert Davenport, a character from the British children's comedy Rentaghost
- Andrea Davenport, a character from the Disney Channel animated series The Ghost and Molly McGee

== Education ==
- Davenport College, a residential college at Yale University
- Davenport University, a college in Michigan
  - Davenport Panthers, the above school's athletic program

== Furniture ==
- Davenport (sofa), a series of sofas, now a genericized trademark for "sofa"
- Davenport desk, an antique desk form
- A. H. Davenport and Company, a turn-of-the-20th-century furniture maker

== Science and mathematics ==
- Davenport constant, in mathematics, an invariant of a group studied in additive combinatorics
- Davenport diagram, a graphical tool used in acid base physiology
- Davenport chained rotations, a mathematical decomposition of a matrix as a set of chained rotations

== Transport ==
- Davenport Locomotive Works, an American locomotive manufacturer
- Davenport railway station (England)
- Davenport station (Ontario), a former station in Toronto, Canada
- USS Davenport, a US Tacoma-class frigate

== Other uses ==
- The Davenports, a rock band from New York, formed in 2000
- Davenport Pottery, a manufacturer of pottery in Longport, Staffordshire in the Nineteenth Century

== See also ==
- Devenport
- Devonport (disambiguation)
- Davenport Hotel (disambiguation)
