= Ontario Southland Railway =

Shortline freight railway based in London, Ontario, Canada

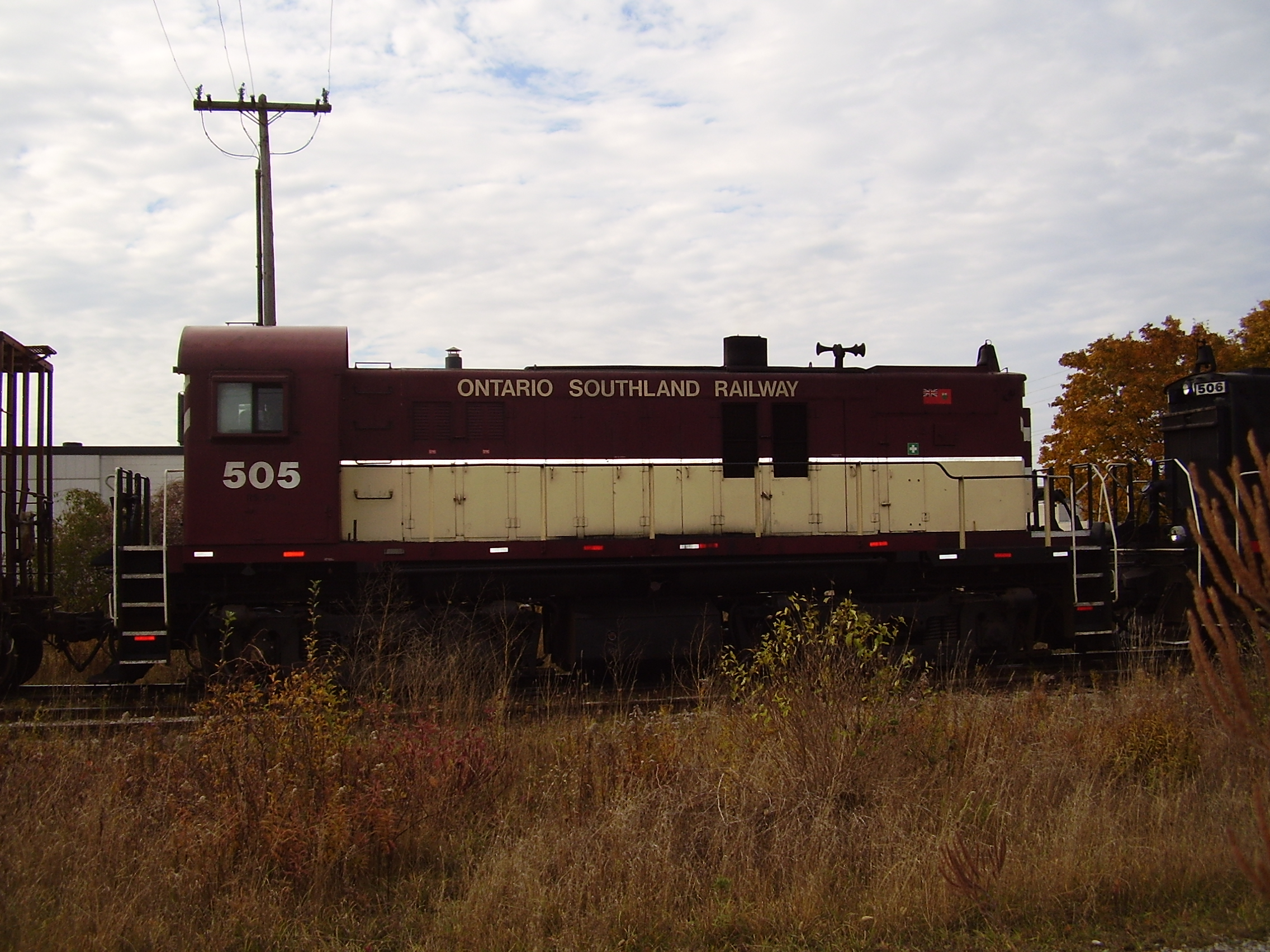
- OSRX #505, an MLW RS-23, at Guelph in 2009

Overview
- Headquarters: London, Ontario
- Reporting mark: OSRX
- Locale: Southern Ontario, Canada
- Dates of operation: 1992–Present

Technical
- Track gauge: 4 ft 8 1/2 in (1,435 mm) standard gauge

Other
- Website: http://osrinc.ca/

The Ontario Southland Railway, Inc. is an independently held short line operator. The company was founded in 1992 to purchase 27 kilometres (17 mi) of track between Tillsonburg and Ingersoll, Ontario from the Canadian Pacific Railway (CPR). In 2009, a second line was added, as 51 kilometres (32 mi) of CPR track from Woodstock to St. Thomas, Ontario were integrated into the system. In 2015, Ontario Southland began leasing the ex-Canadian National Cayuga Subdivision between St. Thomas and Delhi, Ontario, which had been abandoned by its former shortline operator the St. Thomas and Eastern Railway in 2013.

OSR also operated the Guelph Junction Railway until 28 August 2020 when operations were transferred to the Goderich–Exeter Railway.

== Operations ==
=== Tillsonburg Operations ===
OSR's Tillsonburg Division operates on the remaining 28.3 kilometres (17.6 mi) of the ex-CPR Port Burwell Subdivision between Ingersoll and Tillsonburg, Ontario. Customers served include Future Transfer, Cedar Crest Wood Products, Kissner Group, Johnson Controls, International Beams, and Wellmaster. Traffic destined for Growmark, Inc. in Delhi, Ontario, as well as Cargill and Norfolk Co-Op in Courtland, Ontario is also handled.

=== St. Thomas Operations ===
On 14 December 2009, the OSR began leasing the St. Thomas Subdivision from CPR consisting of 54.1 kilometres (33.6 mi) of track from Woodstock to St. Thomas, Ontario. Customers served include Ontario Refrigerated Services, Auto Warehousing Company, Agrium, Belmont Farm Supply, Sylvite, Messenger Freight Services, and Factor Gas Liquids. Interchange with CN at St. Thomas and with CP at Woodstock.

=== CAMI Automotive Operations ===
OSR performs switching at the CAMI Automotive plant in Ingersoll, Ontario. The facility experiences an approximate daily influx and outflow of 100 multis.

=== Cayuga Subdivision ===
In November 2015, OSR and Canadian National (CN) Railways made a joint announcement regarding the transfer of operations on CN's disused Cayuga subdivision. The responsibility of managing the St. Thomas–Tillsonburg segment (and extending to Delhi, Ontario) was handed over to OSR. However, this transition would commence after essential track maintenance was carried out, aiming to facilitate the transportation needs of a newly established windmill turbine factory situated east of Tillsonburg. Other customers served include two grain elevators in Courtland, Ontario, an ethanol plant in Aylmer, Ontario and a fertilizer plant in Delhi.

== Locomotive Roster ==
Number	Builder	Model	Serial	Build Date	Remarks
51	EMD	NW2	5703	1947-12	Nee TH&B 51
52	EMD	SW9	A151	1951-02	Nee C&O 5242
102	EMD	GP9	A2019	1963	Ex-AC 172, Nee ET 102
175	EMD	GP9	22576	1956-11	Nee C&O 6193
180	MLW	RS-18u	82450	1958-04	Ex-CP 1860, née CP RS18 8769
181	MLW	RS-18u	82458	1958-05	Ex-CP 1861, née CP RS18 8777, Sold to Sartigan Railway
182	MLW	RS-18u	82258	1958-04	Ex-QGRY 1801, ex-CP 1801, née CP RS18 8764
183	MLW	RS-18	M3497-02	1968-05	Nee INCX 208-3
184	MLW	RS-18	M3497-03	1968-08	Nee INCX 208-4
378	EMD	GP7	14008	1951-03	Nee SOO 378
383	EMD	GP7	16481	1952-07	Nee SOO 383
500	ALCO	S-6	81819	1956-11	Ex-VWL 29, née SP 1073
501	MLW	S-13	82548	1959-01	Ex-GWWD 501, ex-BCOL 501, ex-BCOL 1001, née PGE 1001
502	MLW	S-13	82549	1959-01	Ex-VWL 827, ex-BCOL 502, ex-BCOL 1002, née PGE 1002
503	MLW	RS-23	82581	1959-09	Nee CP 8029, Sold to Sartigan Railway
504	MLW	RS-23	83286	1960-08	Nee CP 8044, Sold to Sartigan Railway
505	MLW	RS-23	82573	1959-09	Nee CP 8021, Sold to Sartigan Railway
506	MLW	RS-23	82476	1959-08	Nee CP 8013, Sold to Sartigan Railway
507	MLW	RS-23	83290	1960-08	Ex-Spruce Falls 109, ex-DEVCO 201, née SL 201
641	MLW	M-420W	M6068-02	1973-09	Nee BCOL 641
644	MLW	M-420W	M6068-05	1973-09	Nee BCOL 644, Sold to Sartigan Railway in Quebec.
646	MLW	M-420W	M6068-07	1973-10	Nee BCOL 646
647	MLW	M-420W	M6068-08	1973-10	Nee BCOL 647, Sold to Sartigan Railway in Quebec.
1116	MLW	RS-18u	81621	1957-06	Ex-CP 1116, ex-CP 1802, née CP RS18 8746
1210	EMD	SW1200RSu	A1492	1958-08	Ex-CP 1210, née CP SW1200RS 8112
1244	EMD	SW1200RSu	A1897	1960-07	Ex-CP 1244, née CP SW1200RS 8151
1245	EMD	SW1200RSu	A1909	1960-09	Ex-CP 1245, née CP SW1200RS 8163
1249	EMD	SW1200RSu	A1914	1960-09	Ex-CP 1249, née CP SW1200RS 8168
1400	EMD	FP9ARM	A1399	1958-07	Ex-RLK 1400, ex-VIA 6303, ex-VIA FP9A 6539, née CN 6539. Acquired by the VIA Historical Association in 2024 and repainted into its 1978 VIA livery.
1401	EMD	FP9ARM	A1195	1957-03	Ex-RLK 1401, ex-VIA 6312, ex-VIA FP9A 6523, née CN 6523
1620	EMD	GP9u	A1115	1957-02	Ex-CP 1620, née CP GP9 8659
6508	EMD	FP9ARM	A638	1954-12	Ex-WSJR 6508, ex-TTSL 6305, ex-VIA 6305, ex-VIA FP9A 6508, née CN 6508
8235	EMD	GP9u	A1474	1958-03	Ex-JLCX 8235, ex-CP 8235, née CP GP9 8822

== See also ==
- List of Ontario railways
- Rail transport in Ontario
