= Super Continental =

Discontinued Canadian passenger train

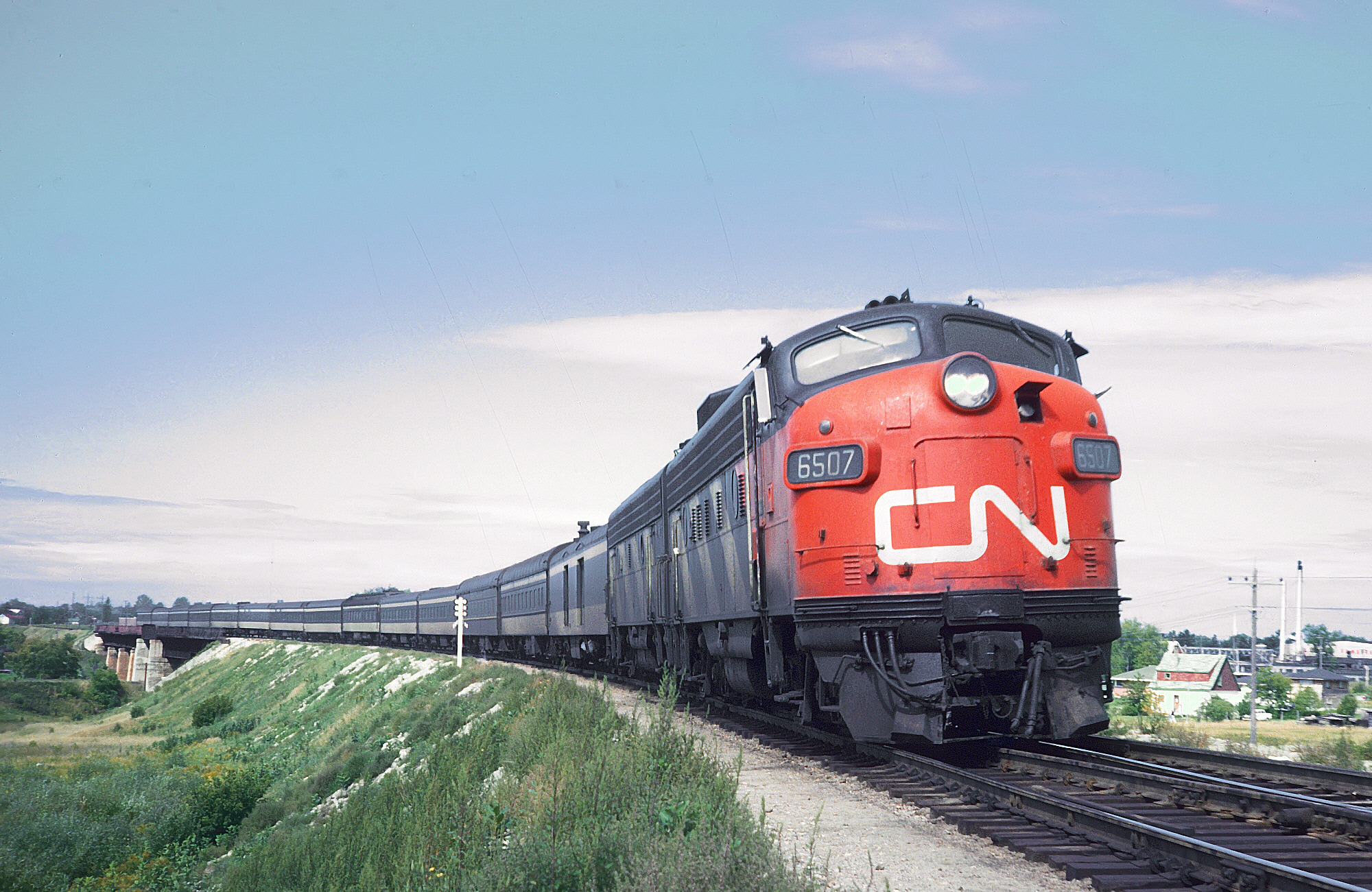
- The Super Continental under Canadian National pulling into Pembroke on September 6, 1965.

Overview
- Status: Discontinued
- Locale: Canada
- First service: April 24, 1955; 70 years ago
- Last service: January 14, 1990; 35 years ago
- Former operators: Canadian National (1955–1977); Via Rail (1977–1981; 1985–1990)

Route
- Termini: Montreal; Vancouver
- Distance travelled: 2,930 mi (4,720 km)
- Average journey time: 73 hours, 20 minutes
- Train number: Canadian National Railways 1, 2, 3, 4

Technical
- Track gauge: 4 ft 8 1/2 in (1,435 mm)
Route map
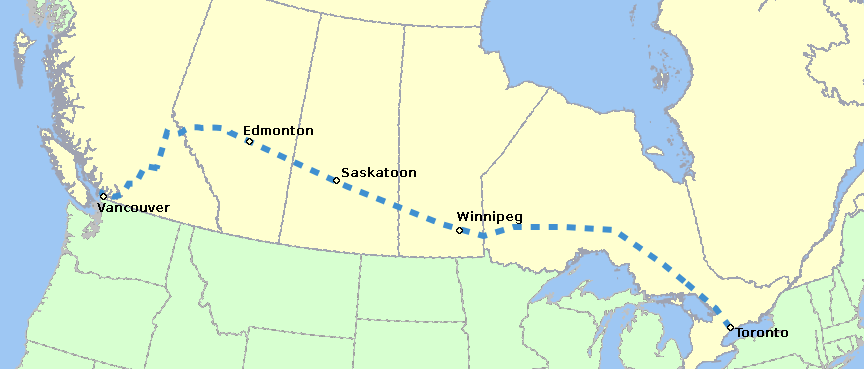

The Super Continental was a transcontinental Canadian passenger train operated by the Canadian National Railway from 1955 until 1977, when Via Rail took over the train and ran it until it was cancelled in 1981. Service was restored in 1985 but was again eliminated in 1990. The original CN train had a Montreal–Ottawa–Toronto-Winnipeg–Saskatoon–Edmonton–Jasper–Vancouver routing with daily service.

== CN passenger service in the postwar era ==
Following World War II, CN's passenger fleet was in need of modernization, and between 1946 and 1950 the railway purchased a total of 75 new lightweight coaches and sleeping cars. However, post-war material shortages constrained the number of cars that CN was able to procure commercially, leading to a significant programme of in-house refurbishment of older heavyweight equipment in the CN carshops. Ultimately a total of 211 heavyweight cars were fitted out with new interiors, roller bearing trucks, and sealed windows. Nevertheless, it quickly became apparent that refurbished equipment alone would not be sufficient to remain competitive, and in 1952 CN placed a large order for new lightweight equipment. This order consisted of 218 coaches from the Canadian Car and Foundry in Montreal, as well as 92 sleeping cars, 20 dining cars, 17 parlour cars, and 12 buffet-sleepers from the Chicago-based Pullman-Standard Company.

== Service history ==
=== Inauguration of service ===
Deliveries of the new cars were essentially completed by 1954, but CN waited until April 24, 1955, to introduce its new transcontinental flagship Super Continental to replace its former flagship, the Continental Limited. Not coincidentally, this was the same date that competitor Canadian Pacific Railway introduced its new streamlined transcontinental train The Canadian. Before its introduction in regular service, the equipment that was to be used for the Super Continental was displayed at some of the stations on the train's route. The Super Continental reduced the travel time between Montreal and Vancouver by up to 14 hours, removing the need for a fourth night aboard the train. The journey was advertised as the longest single run of a diesel locomotive powered train in North America without changing locomotives.

In 1960, CN and CP both introduced "transcontinental local" trains, which were really reconfigurations of existing services, that were intended to serve passengers on shorter trips that followed the same routes as the Super Continental and The Canadian. On CN, the Continental was used while on CP the Dominion was used.

Despite the new and refurbished equipment and a new black-and-green, yellow-trim paint scheme, the Super Continental's mixture of equipment paled in comparison to CP's all stainless-steel consist, produced for them by the Budd Company. An additional important distinction was that The Canadian featured scenic dome cars, which the Super Continental did not use. CN chose not to purchase dome cars for reasons of economy, although it has also been claimed that dome cars might interfere with the electrified catenary used in Montreal's Central Station by commuter trains of the former Canadian Northern raillines. In 1964, CN purchased used dome cars that came from United States to use on the portion of the route between Edmonton and Vancouver from the Milwaukee Road.

Although the CN was not completely dieselized until 1960, the Super Continental was from the outset hauled by a variety of diesel locomotives, including Montreal Locomotive Works FP-2s and FP-4s, Canadian Locomotive Company C-liners in eastern Canada, and General Motors Diesel FP9 units in western Canada.

=== Decline of passenger trains ===
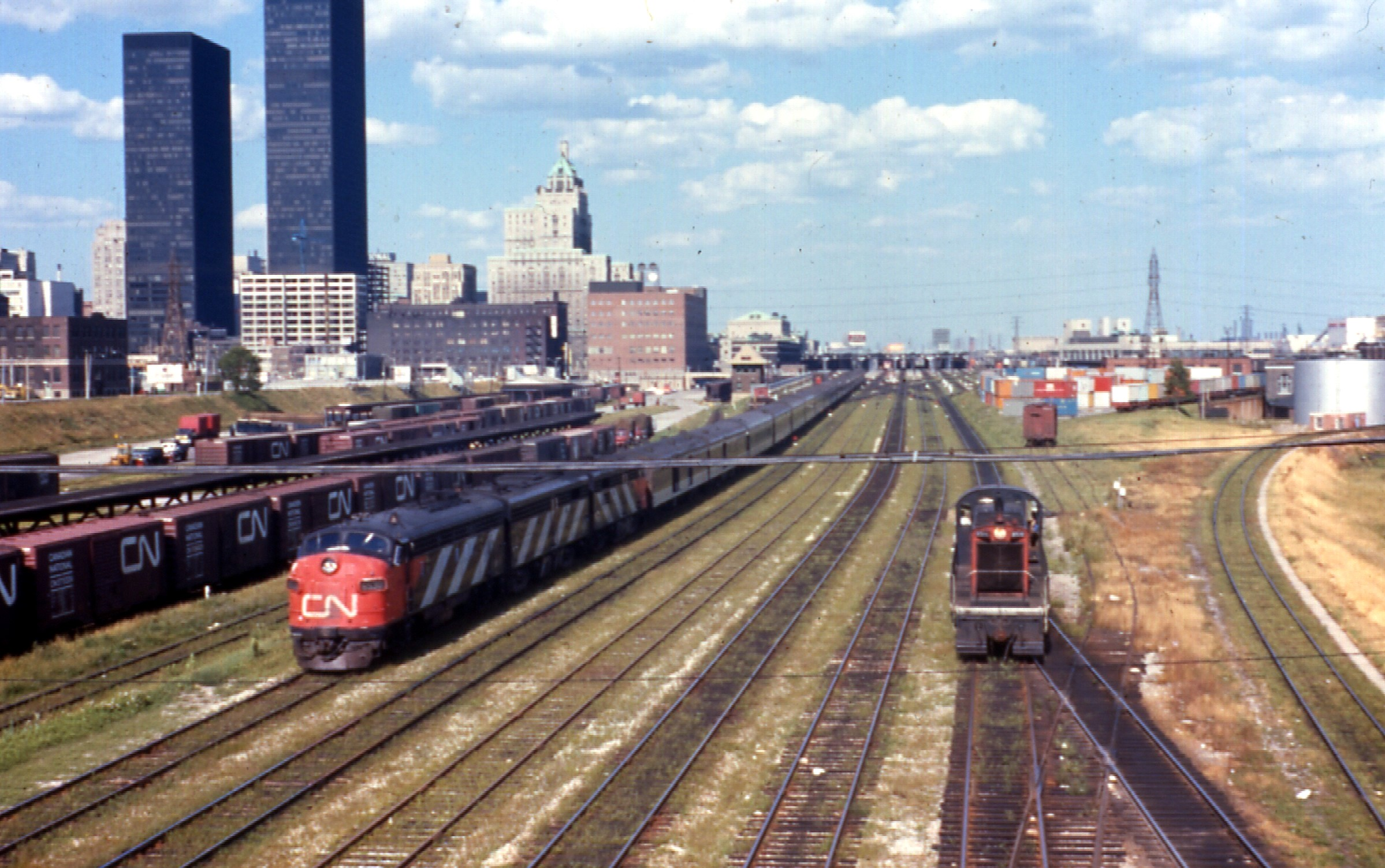
The Super Continental leaving Toronto for Vancouver 1970

By the 1960s, Canadian passenger trains were in serious decline, largely thanks to government subsidies for automobiles travelling the then-new Trans-Canada Highway and for airlines. The Continental Limited, the Super Continental's predecessor, was cut back to a Montreal to Saskatoon train in 1964 and then discontinued the following year. The CN nevertheless aggressively marketed its services, even while CP was losing interest in operating The Canadian. To help combat the perception that the CP route through the Rocky Mountains was more scenic, CN in 1964 acquired a set of six ex-Milwaukee Road "Super Dome" cars (rechristened "Sceneramics" by CN) that had formerly seen service on the Olympian Hiawatha. These were placed into service between Winnipeg and Vancouver. CN also refurbished the coaches that were used on the train, adding new luggage racks and lounge areas to some cars. A new secondary train along the route, The Panorama, was placed into service in 1965. It was later discontinued in 1969. But despite CN's best efforts, ridership continued to decline throughout the 1970s, and the train operated at a loss. In 1969 it was estimated that the Super Continental operated at a loss of $14,058,030.

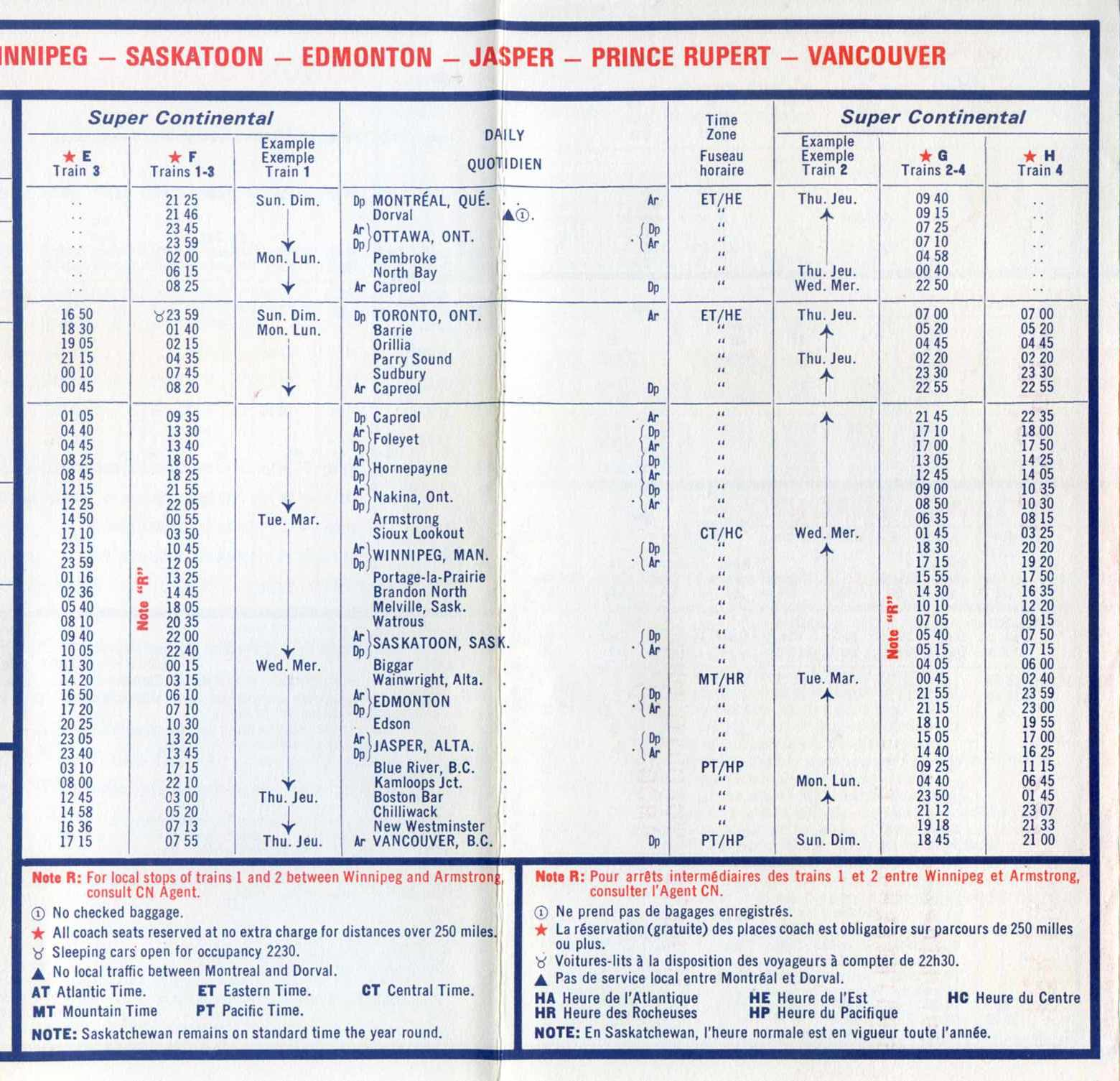
A Super Continental timetable from 1975, while CN still operated the service

CN applied to the Canadian Transport Commission to discontinue the Super Continental in 1971, but the commission declined the application, forcing CN to continue service despite falling revenue. With losses increasing to $55.9 million in 1975, CN again submitted an application to discontinue the service in 1976 and was again denied by the commission.

=== Via Rail takeover and first cancellation ===
On April 1, 1978, a new federal Crown corporation called Via Rail Canada formally assumed responsibility for the passenger services of CN. Via Rail also assumed responsibility for CP Rail's passenger services on October 29, 1978, giving it two transcontinental routes: the Canadian and the Super Continental. Via Rail reconfigured these routes, making the Canadian a Montreal–Vancouver train and the Super Continental a Toronto–Vancouver train. Sleeping cars were exchanged in Winnipeg between the two trains. The Canadian became the company's premier transcontinental train and the Super Continental was relegated to secondary status. Nevertheless, a confluence of astute marketing, high gasoline prices, and rampant inflation actually led to an increase in ridership during the early 1980s. However, the 1981 federal budget of Prime Minister Pierre Trudeau's Liberal government led to fully 20% of Via's route miles being eliminated. The Super Continental was among the trains immediately cut. Its last service arrived in Vancouver on November 16, 1981.

Such reductions in passenger service proved to be politically unpopular. For example, the cancellation of the Super Continental had a significant impact on the Jasper, Alberta tourism industry. The train had brought around 100,000 tourists per year to the town. In 1982, these numbers were not made up by tourists travelling by other methods. The cancellation was criticized by local business groups, with the Jasper Chamber of Commerce filing an unsuccessful injunction on procedural grounds with the Court of Queen's Bench of Alberta, arguing that the federal cabinet had acted illegally by circumventing the Canadian Transportation Commission in cancelling the service.

Following the election of the Progressive Conservative government of Brian Mulroney in 1984, service was restored on June 1, 1985, but on a truncated route from Vancouver to Winnipeg via Edmonton that no longer lived up to the 'Continental' name. The Toronto/Montreal to Sudbury segment was eliminated, and the Capreol–Winnipeg segment was reduced to a triweekly nameless remote services train. During this period, Via Rail was also able to re-equip the Super Continental with modern GMD F40PH locomotives. On February 8, 1986, human error resulted in Via's eastbound Super Continental colliding with a CN freight train at Dalehurst, Alberta, near Hinton, killing 23 people.

=== Second cancellation ===
By the late 1980s, federal budgets were under serious pressure, and the Mulroney government's 1989 budget proved disastrous for Via Rail. The Super Continental was cancelled again; the last trains left Winnipeg and Vancouver on January 14, 1990. This left The Canadian as Via's sole transcontinental train. It was moved to the longer CN route used by the first incarnation of the Super Continental.

== Accidents and incidents ==
Three occupants of an automobile, one of whom was the driver, were killed on March 26, 1956, when the car they were in was struck by the Super Continental at a little-used level crossing in Quibell, Ontario, about 175 miles (282 km) east of Winnipeg. The train was travelling at high speed in this area at the time. Police on the scene could not initially indicate a cause for the collision.

As the Super Continental pulled into the station in Ottawa on October 9, 1956, the last four cars of the train derailed on a switch. The train was moving at slow speed for entry into the station, so no injuries were reported, but several wheels needed to be replaced. The derailment delayed the train by 8 hours that day.

On February 13, 1960, the Super Continental, running 3 hours late, collided head-on with a 39-car freight train near Osawin, 32 miles (51 km) west of Hornepayne, Ontario. The passenger train's engineer was killed and 33 passengers and 4 railwaymen were injured.

The westbound Super Continental collided head-on with a freight train that was leaving a siding and entering the main line near Dunrankin, Ontario, on August 2, 1967. The engineer and fireman on the Super Continental were both killed, while the engineer and a brakeman on the freight train were reported as missing and presumed dead. One passenger was taken to hospital, while the other 150 passengers sustained no or only minor injuries. A fire started from oil spilled from the locomotives, but the fire was quickly put out from the help of nearby section hands who organized a bucket brigade with sand to smother the flames.

The westbound Super Continental struck a 400-foot-long (120 m) and up to 8-foot-deep (2.4 m) mudslide and derailed on March 29, 1972, at a location 90 miles (140 km) north of Kamloops, British Columbia. The head-end crew sustained minor injuries, but all 243 passengers were reported as uninjured.

An eastbound freight train and the westbound Super Continental collided at around 2:30 am on September 28, 1974, at a location about 105 miles (169 km) north of Kamloops. Initial reports indicated the accident may have been caused by an "automatic switching malfunction" that put the freight train on the same track. The freight train was travelling at 25 mph (40 km/h) while the Super Continental was travelling at 35 mph (56 km/h). The engineer and a trainman on the freight train were both killed; there was at least one report of looting among the passengers, but many of the children aboard the train stayed asleep through the accident.

On August 8, 1980, the eastbound Super Continental derailed twelve cars at a location about 120 kilometres (75 mi) east of Jasper, Alberta. The train remained upright with only one broken arm reported for personal injuries.

=== Hinton train collision ===
In the morning of February 8, 1986, as passengers were getting breakfast, the Super Continental ran head-on into a CN freight train about 16 kilometres (9.9 mi) east of Hinton, Alberta. The collision created a massive fireball that sped along the train's length; both trains buckled from the impact. Initial reports stated that at least 29 people died in the accident, although this was later reduced to 26, then later 23. making it one of the more deadly incidents in Canadian railway history. Subsequent investigation showed that the freight train passed a stop signal and ran through a closed switch to pull in front of the Super Continental.
