= Hinton train collision =

1986 railway accident near Hinton, Alberta, Canada

Details
- Date: February 8, 1986; 40 years ago 08:40 (MST)
- Location: Dalehurst, Alberta
- Coordinates: 53°29′47″N 117°22′11″W
- Country: Canada
- Line: Edson Subdivision
- Operator: Canadian National Railway; Via Rail
- Incident type: Head-on collision
- Cause: Possible: locomotive engineer/brakeman fatigue, or heart attack or stroke; Unknown reasons: engineer/brakeman failures; Conductor error

Statistics
- Trains: 2
- Passengers: 94
- Crew: 24
- Deaths: 23
- Injured: 71

The Hinton train collision was a railway accident that occurred in what is now Yellowhead County, Alberta, Canada, on February 8, 1986. Twenty-three people were killed when a Canadian National Railway freight train collided with a Via Rail passenger train named the Super Continental.

A 56-day public inquiry concluded that the collision was caused by the freight crew failing to stop their train in time because of incapacitation or other unknown factors. The commission report also highlighted serious flaws in the culture and safety practices at Canadian National Railway.

== Background ==
The collision occurred on a stretch of Canadian National Railway's transcontinental main line west of Edmonton, near the town of Hinton, Alberta. The towns of Jasper to the west and Edson to the east were nearby. Slightly over half of the approximately 100-mile (160 km) stretch of track between Jasper and Edson was double-tracked, including 11.2 miles (18.0 km) of trackage from Hargwen control point west to Dalehurst control point. Traffic on this line was controlled with Centralized Traffic Control (CTC).

=== Passenger train ===
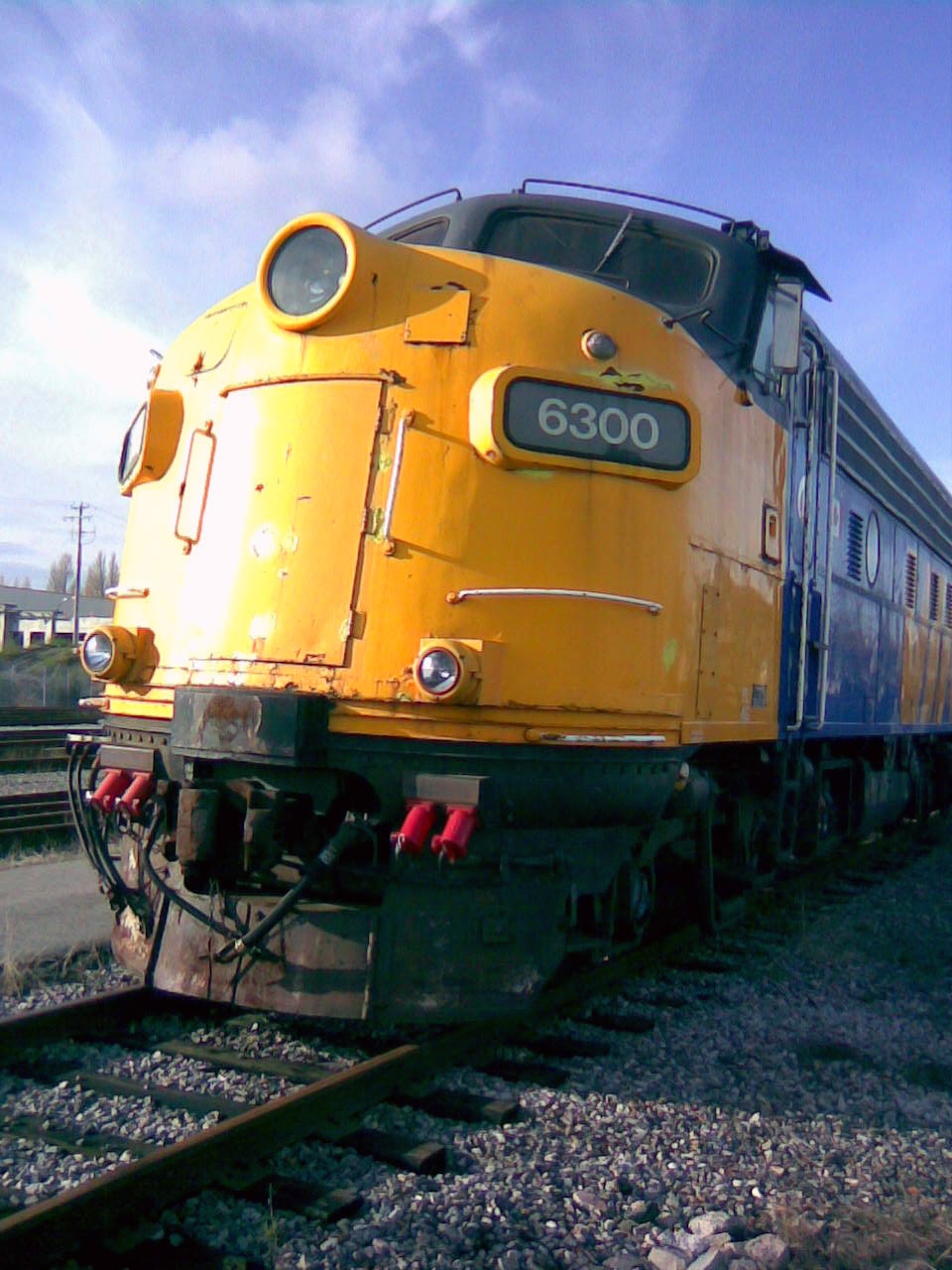
Via Rail No. 6300, the only surviving locomotive from the disaster

On the morning of February 8, 1986, Via Rail Canada train No. 4 was travelling eastbound from Jasper to Edmonton on its transcontinental journey. The train, which combined Super Continental and Skeena, consisted of 14 units in the following order:

1. FP7 Diesel locomotive number 6566
2. F9B Diesel locomotive number 6633
3. Baggage-Dormitory 617
4. Coach-Snack Bar 3229
5. Skyline Dome car number 513
6. 4-8-4 Sleeping car 1139 Ennishore
7. 4-8-4 Sleeping car 1120 Elcott
8. FP9ARM Diesel locomotive number 6300 (inoperative)
9. Steam generator car 15445
10. Baggage car 9653
11. Daynighter Coach 5703
12. Cafe-Lounge 757
13. 4-8-4 Sleeping car 1150 Estcourt
14. Steam generator car 15404

The train's unusual composition was the result of two separate scheduled services from British Columbia being coupled together at Jasper. The front section, which had originated in Vancouver, consisted of two locomotives and five cars while the second (rear) section from Prince Rupert was led by one locomotive and five cars. A steam generator was coupled to the end of the train at Jasper for transfer to Edmonton depot for maintenance.

Engineers Mike Peleshaty, 57, and Emil Miller, 53, were in the lead locomotive. On board the train were 94 passengers, 14 stewards and seven crew (115 total).

=== Freight train ===
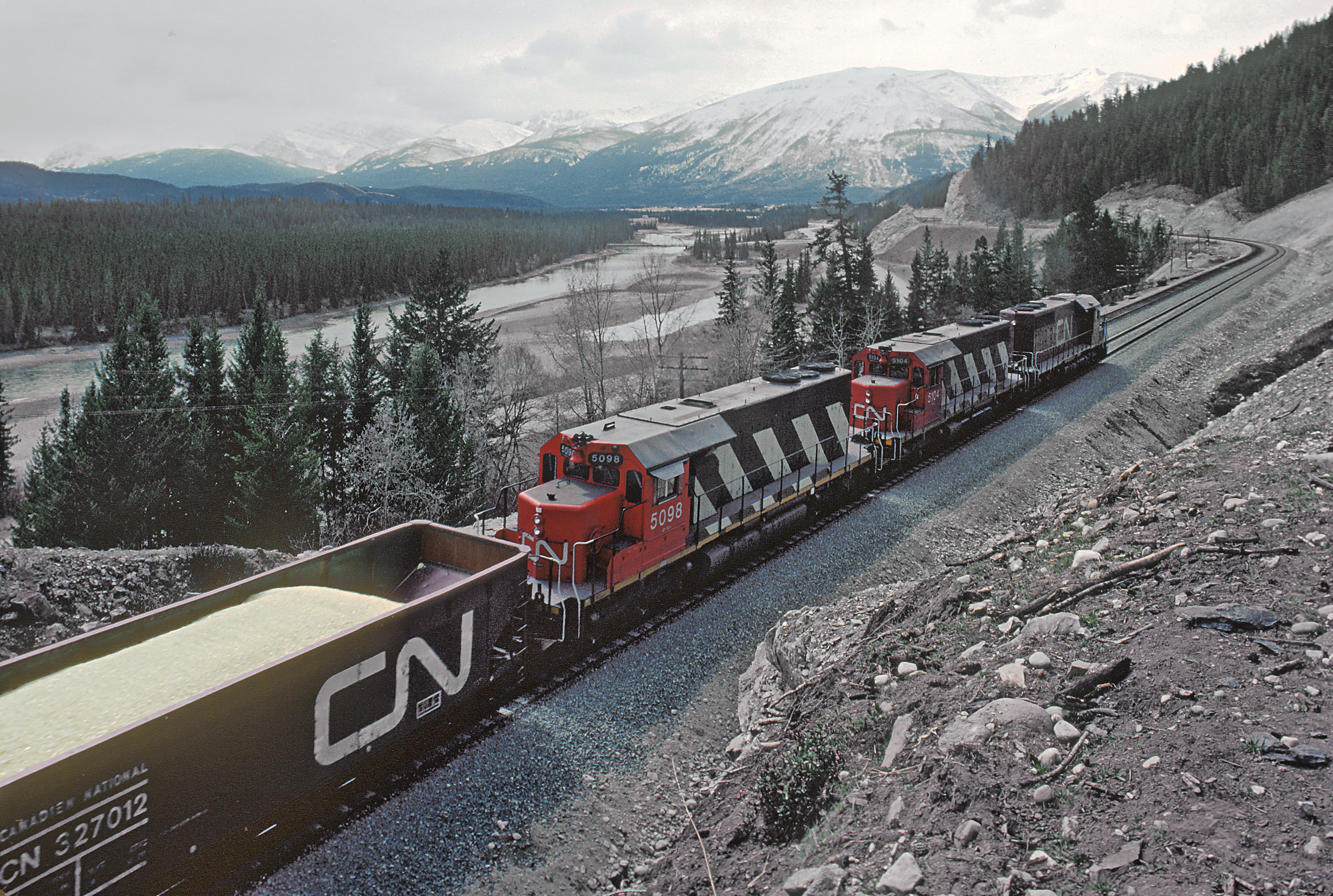
SD40 No. 5104 (the locomotive in the middle), one of the freight locomotives involved in the collision

Canadian National Railway's westbound train No. 413 consisted of three locomotives, EMD GP38-2W No. 5586, and 2 EMD SD40 Nos. 5104 and 5062, followed by a high-speed spreader, 35 cylindrical hoppers loaded with grain, seven bulkhead flat cars loaded with large pipes, 45 hoppers loaded with sulphur, 20 loaded tank cars, six more grain cars, and a caboose; a total consist of three locomotives and 115 cars. It was 6,124 feet (1,867 m) long and weighed 12,804 short tons (11,432 long tons; 11,616 t). On the lead locomotive were engineer John Edward "Jack" Hudson, aged 48, and brakeman Mark Edwards, aged 25. On the caboose, conductor Wayne "Smitty" Smith, aged 33.

== Collision ==
The freight train left Edson at 06:40. About 26 miles (42 km) from Edson, it was halted in the siding at Medicine Lodge to allow two eastbound trains to pass. It departed Medicine Lodge at 08:02 and travelled 6 miles (9.7 km), reaching Hargwen at 08:20 where an 11.2-mile (18.0 km) section of double track started. The train dispatcher at Edmonton set the dual-control switch (DCS) so that the freight train could take the north track.

At about the same time, the Super Continental was stopped at Hinton. It departed five minutes late on the single track. At 08:29, as the Super Continental approached the start of the double track section, the dispatcher from the CTC lined the dual-control switch at Dalehurst to the south track. This set the absolute three-aspect signal at the Dalehurst control point on the north line (about 490 ft (150 m) before the end of double-track) to an absolute stop indication of three steady red lights, telling the freight train to not proceed any farther. This also set the double-aspect approach signal located 13,600 feet (4.1 km) east of Dalehurst to yellow over red, telling the freight train to reduce its speed to 30 miles per hour (48 km/h) and to prepare to stop at Dalehurst.

The crash investigation found that the freight train was traveling at 59 mph (95 km/h) as it passed the approach signal—9 mph (14 km/h) over the 50 mph (80 km/h) speed limit. No attempt was made by the crew of the freight train to slow down before or after passing the approach signal.

The freight train proceeded past the Dalehurst control point, running through the switch and into the section of single track. At 08:40, approximately 18 seconds after the lead locomotive of the freight train entered the single section, it collided head on with the oncoming Super Continental.

Both lead locomotives were destroyed, and their crews killed. The front cars and freight cars derailed. Diesel fuel from the locomotives ignited, engulfing them, the baggage car, and the day coach in flames; 18 of the day coach's 36 occupants died. Due to momentum, the cars on the freight train piled up on each other resulting in a large pile of debris. All three freight locomotives followed by 76 hoppers and tank cars were either destroyed or severely damaged.

On the passenger train, one coach was crushed by a freight car after it was thrown into the air by the force of the collision, killing one of its occupants. In the dome car, others were able to escape either through a window in the dome that had been broken by a passenger, or through the hole left by the freight car. The two sleepers following the dome car jackknifed into each other and were thrown on their sides causing injuries but no deaths. The mid train locomotive (6300) was severely damaged; it was later repaired with a new cab section from a KCS EMD F7. The last three passenger cars at the rear of the train did not derail, but there were many injuries.

After the rear of the freight train came to a halt, conductor Smith, still in the caboose, attempted (unsuccessfully) to contact the front of the train before contacting emergency services after seeing the fire in the distance.

== Investigation ==
The Canadian government set up a Commission of Inquiry to investigate the crash. It was led by Justice René P. Foisy, then of Court of Queen's Bench of Alberta (subsequently of the Court of Appeal of Alberta). The inquiry lasted 56 days of public hearings and received evidence from 150 parties. The Foisy Commission published its full report on 22 January 1987.

The inquiry concluded that no one individual was to blame; instead it condemned what Foisy described as a "railroader culture" that prized loyalty and productivity at the expense of safety. As an example of lax attitudes to safety, Foisy noted that engine crews that took over trains at Edson did so "on the fly". While the locomotive was moving slowly through the yard, the new crew would jump on and the previous crew would jump off. While this method saved time and fuel, it was a flagrant violation of safety regulations which required stationary brake tests after a crew change. Management claimed to be unaware of this practice, even though it was quite common. In regards to engineer John Hudson, the Foisy Commission concluded it was a possibility that the collision happened because he had either fallen asleep at the controls or had suffered a heart attack or stroke due to his extremely poor health.

The report highlighted that there was no evidence that either train made any attempt to brake prior to the collision. Analysis of the line showed both trains would have been visible to each other for only the final 19 seconds before the collision. No conclusive reason could be found for the failure of the passenger train crew to react, neither was there any evidence that the Super Continental crew had made any errors before the accident. No evidence could be found to explain why the freight train failed to stop at the absolute signal at the Dalehurst control point. After a wrong-side signal problem was eliminated, human error was considered the only possible cause. Tests on the crews' remains ruled out drugs or alcohol as a cause, though it was revealed that the engineer of the freight train, Jack Hudson, was an alcoholic and heavy smoker who suffered from pancreatitis and type 2 diabetes, thus placing him at risk for a heart attack or stroke. The commission further criticized CN's ineffective monitoring of Hudson's health condition:

The serious nature of Hudson's medical condition...raises a strong possibility that it was a factor contributing to the collision of February 8...The Commission therefore concludes that engineer Hudson's medical condition possibly contributed to his failure to control Train 413. The Commission also concludes that there are serious deficiencies in the manner in which CN monitored and reacted to that condition. The Commission finds that both the policies and procedures that permitted a man in Hudson's medical state to be responsible for the operation of a freight train on the CN main line to be unacceptable.

Another frequently ignored safety regulation mentioned in the report was the "deadman's pedal", which a locomotive engineer had to keep depressed for the train to remain underway. Were he to fall asleep or pass out, his foot would slip from the pedal, triggering an alarm and engaging the train's brakes automatically a few seconds later. However, many engineers found this tiresome and bypassed the pedal by placing a heavy weight (often a worn out brake shoe) on it. It was uncertain whether the pedal had been bypassed in this case because the lead locomotive of the train had been destroyed. A more advanced safety device was available, the reset safety control (RSC), which required crew members to take an action such as pushing a button at regular intervals, or else automatic braking would occur, but neither lead locomotive was equipped with this safety feature. While the second locomotive in the freight train was equipped with RSC, it was not assigned as the lead locomotive because it lacked a "comfort cab". Management and union practice was to place more comfortable locomotives at the front of trains, even at the expense of safety.

The report also noted that although the front-end and rear-end crews should have been in regular communication, that did not appear to be the case in this accident. As the freight train reached Hargwen, engineer Hudson radioed back to conductor Smith that the signals were green, a communication that was heard by a following freight. As it ran towards Dalehurst there was no evidence of further communication. The conductor is in charge of the train, so if Smith felt that the train was out of control or there were serious problems, he should have activated the emergency brake in the caboose to stop the train. However, Smith, who appeared to be nervous while testifying, said that he did not feel that the freight was ever out of control, misjudging its speed. He also testified that he attempted to radio Hudson on two radios and several channels, but neither seemed to be working, even though immediately after the crash Smith was able to contact the dispatcher by radio. In any event, on the failure to receive communication from the head end, regulations required him to activate the emergency brake.

== Aftermath ==
Most of the rolling stock and almost all of the locomotives were damaged beyond economical repair from the collision, and they were subsequently sold for scrap. Only the inoperable Via Rail unit, FP9ARM 6300, was repaired after the collision. It returned to service following a rebuild with an entire new cab from a Kansas City Southern F7 locomotive 4062. It was the last FP9 in service on Via Rail before it was retired in September 2011, and it was subsequently acquired by the British Columbia Chapter of the National Railway Historical Society. As of 2023, 6300 resides at the Heber Valley Railroad in Heber City, Utah.

Smith was dismissed from CN on July 25, 1986 "for failure to fulfill the responsibilities of a Conductor" in ensuring the brakes were properly tested prior to the accident and "for failure to comply with General Operating Instruction" since he did not take action to stop the freight train when Hudson and Edwards failed to respond from the lead locomotive. The United Transportation Union appealed Smith's dismissal almost a year later, and when CN declined the appeal, Michel G. Picher of the Canadian Railway Office of Arbitration ruled in Smith's favor that he should be reinstated to CN in a position other than conductor after Smith tearfully expressed remorse for his role in the crash.

== Dramatization ==
The disaster was featured in "Head-on Collision", a season-3 (2005) Crash Scene Investigation episode of the Canadian TV series Mayday. For broadcasters that do not use the series name Mayday, this is one of three Season 3 episodes labelled as Crash Scene Investigation spin-offs, examining marine or rail disasters.

== Similar accidents ==
- 1987 Maryland train collision, in which a freight also disregarded signals and was rear-ended by an Amtrak passenger train at full speed; the crew of that freight was also found to have limited mental capacity due to marijuana use and had disabled safety features as well.
- 2008 Chatsworth train collision, in which a Metrolink commuter train disregarded signals and collided head-on with a Union Pacific freight train; the engineer of the commuter train was concluded to have been distracted by text messages.
- 2018 Cayce, South Carolina train collision, in which misaligned switches caused an Amtrak passenger train to collide with a CSX freight train.

== See also ==
- List of rail accidents (1980–89)
- List of rail accidents in Canada
