= EMD FP9 =

American diesel locomotive

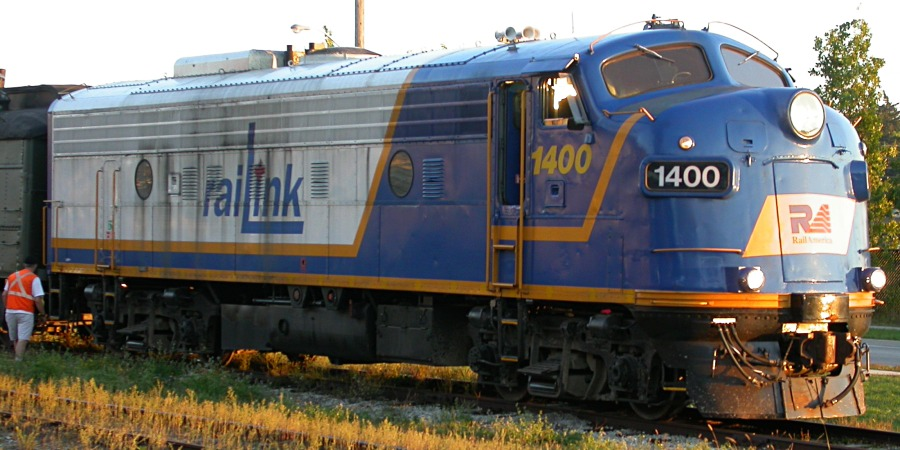
- RLGN 1400 (originally CN 6539) in 2003
Type and origin
- Power type: Diesel-electric
- Builder: General Motors Electro-Motive Division (EMD); General Motors Diesel (GMD, Canada)
- Model: FP9
- Build date: February 1954 – December 1959
- Total produced: 86
Specifications
- Configuration
  - AAR: B-B
- Gauge: 4 ft 8 1/2 in (1,435 mm)
- Trucks: Blomberg B
- Wheel diameter: 40 in (1,016 mm)
- Minimum curve: 23° (250.79 ft or 76.44 m radius)
- Wheelbase: 43 ft (13.11 m)
- Length: 55 ft 2 1/4 in (16.82 m)
- Width: 10 ft 8 in (3.25 m)
- Height: 15 ft (4.57 m)
- Loco weight: 260,000 lb (120,000 kg)
- Fuel capacity: 1,200 US gal (4,500 L; 1,000 imp gal)
- Prime mover: EMD 16-567C
- RPM range: 800
- Engine type: V16 Two-stroke diesel
- Aspiration: Roots blower
- Displacement: 9,072 cu in (148.66 L)
- Generator: EMD D-12
- Traction motors: (4) EMD D-37
- Cylinders: 16
- Cylinder size: 8 1/2 in × 10 in (216 mm × 254 mm)
Performance figures
- Maximum speed: 65–105 mph (105–169 km/h)
- Power output: 1,750 horsepower (1,300 kW)
Career
- Locale: North America, Saudi Arabia

The EMD FP9 is an American 1,750 horsepower (1,300 kW), B-B dual-service passenger and freight-hauling diesel locomotive that was produced between February 1954 and December 1959 by General Motors Electro-Motive Division, and General Motors Diesel. Final assembly was at GM-EMD's La Grange, Illinois plant, except for Canadian orders, which were assembled by Canadian subsidiary GMD at London, Ontario.

The FP9 was essentially EMD's F9 locomotive extended by 4 feet (1.2 m) to give greater steam generator and water capacity for hauling passenger trains. A total of 86 cab-equipped lead A units were built; unlike the freight series, no cabless booster B units were sold. Regular F9B units were sometimes used with FP9 A units, since they, lacking cabs, had more room for water and steam generators. The FP9 and its predecessor, the FP7, were offshoots of GM-EMD's highly successful F-unit series of cab unit diesel locomotives.

== Original owners ==
EMD built 86 FP9 locomotives. The two largest buyers were the Canadian National Railway and Ferrocarriles Nacionales de México, which bought 43 and 25 locomotives, respectively. Four locomotives delivered to the Chicago and North Western Railway were rebuilt from traded-in EMD FT locomotives and designated FP9M. Locomotives intended for use in Canada were built by General Motors Diesel, EMD's Canadian subsidiary. These included the Canadian National's order, and eleven for the Canadian Pacific Railway.

== See also ==
- VIA FP9ARM
- EMD F9
- EMD FL9
- List of GM-EMD locomotives
- List of GMD Locomotives
