= Devonport =

Devonport may refer to:

- Devonport, Plymouth, Devon, England
  - HMNB Devonport, naval base/dockyard
  - Plymouth Devonport (UK Parliament constituency), parliamentary constituency formerly known as Devonport
- Devonport, New Zealand, a suburb of Auckland
  - Devonport Naval Base, located in the same suburb
- Devonport, Tasmania, a city in Tasmania
  - Devonport City Council, the local government area that contains the city
- Craig Devonport (born 1970), Australian rules footballer

== See also ==
- Davenport (disambiguation)
- Devenport
