= Guelph Junction Railway =

Railway in Guelph, Ontario

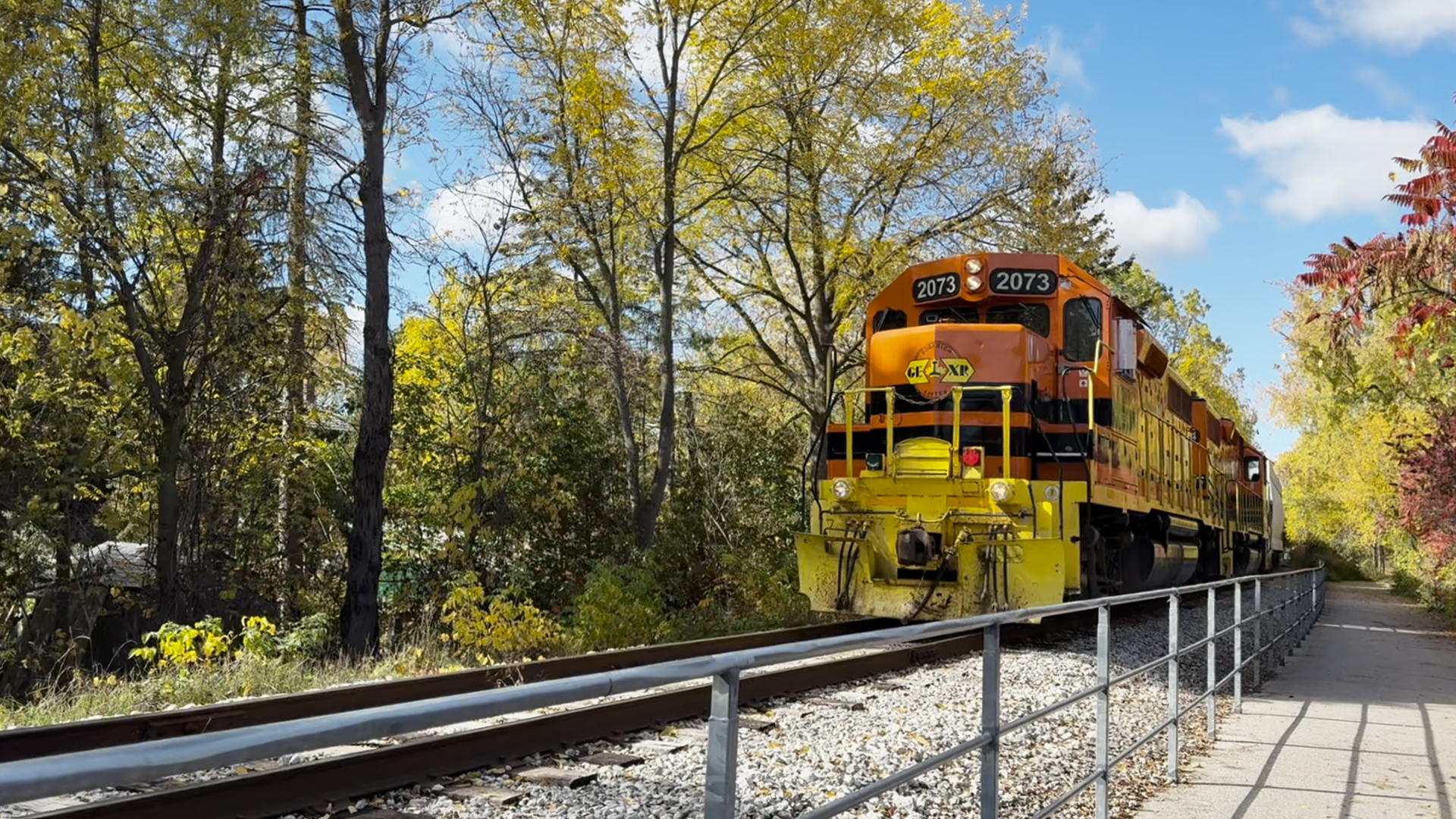
- A freight train with GEXR 2073 rumbles along Downtown Trail

Overview
- Headquarters: Guelph, Ontario
- Reporting mark: GJR
- Locale: Southern Ontario, Canada
- Dates of operation: 1884–Present

Technical
- Track gauge: 4 ft 8 1/2 in (1,435 mm) standard gauge

Other
- Website: guelphjunctionrailway.ca

The Guelph Junction Railway is a shortline railway owned by the City of Guelph, Ontario, and serves the city's northwest industrial park.

The railway was the first federally chartered railway in the Commonwealth of Nations to be owned by a municipality, and, along with the Greater Winnipeg Water District Railway and the Capital Railway, is among the few remaining municipally owned railways in Canada.

== History ==
The railway was incorporated in 1884 by Guelph merchants because of the indifference of the Grand Trunk Railway, which was the only choice for freight since 1856. Competition was the only answer to high rates. These plans were expanded in 1887, when authorization was obtained to lay down a further line to the northwest of Guelph, originally with the intention of going to Goderich but eventually ending at Linwood. The intention was to build tracks 15 miles (24 km) south to the CPR main line in Campbellville, Ontario. Construction began in May that year, and it opened on 20 August 1888. Rather than operate the link themselves, they leased it to the Canadian Pacific Railway who offered twice daily passenger service as well as freight service. The City of Guelph was a majority (70 percent) owner and in November 1910 it acquired the rest of the stock from the merchants for sole ownership.

The Canadian Pacific Railway erected a passenger station and freight shed at Priory Square in Guelph, a location which is now the River Run Centre.

In 1904, the Railway obtained authorization to construct branch lines from Linwood by way of Stratford to St. Marys and Clinton, and from Linwood to Listowel. The Stratford branch was never constructed, while the Listowel branch opened in 1908.

In December 1997, the Canadian Pacific Railway did not renew the lease with Guelph Junction Railway. Undeterred, the city decided it would continue Guelph Junction Railway as an independent railway and contracted with Ontario Southland Railway (OSR) to provide the freight movement services, effective 1 January 1998. The Guelph Junction Railway, via OSR, provides customers with dual access service to the two major railways (CNR and CPR), which, along with good locally managed service, has increased traffic considerably. Much of the cargo is grain, plastics, chemicals, lumber, aggregates and other industrial products. Several other companies expressed interest in operating the Guelph Junction Railway after the OSR's lease expired in July 2020, with the Goderich-Exeter Railway assuming operations of the GJR at the end of the contract.

=== Guelph and Goderich Railway ===
The Railway promoted an expansion of its operations through the incorporation of the Guelph and Goderich Railway in 1901, which added a line extending 80 miles (130 km) from Guelph to Goderich that was completed in August 1907. The GJR was authorized to transfer its present northwest line to either the CPR or the G&G in order to further the project. The whole line was leased to the CPR, which had also incurred the cost of building it, and it was vested in the CPR, and the company dissolved, in 1956. It was in use until 1988 when it was abandoned by the CPR.

=== Guelph Junction Express ===
From Summer 2008 to August 2011, a 4 1/2 hour passenger tour service travelled the entire Guelph Junction Railway track as the Guelph Junction Express with its own 1950s vintage stainless steel cars. The service was owned by private individuals operating as Destiny Tours International.

== See also ==
- List of Ontario railways
