= Devenport =

Devenport is a surname. Notable people with this surname include:

- Barrie Devenport (1935–2010), New Zealand swimmer and lifesaver
- Dominique Devenport, Swiss-American actress
- Emily Devenport (born 20th century), American science fiction writer
- Eric Devenport (1926–2012), British bishop
- Mary Devenport O'Neill (1879–1967, née Devenport), Irish poet and dramatist
- Paul Devenport (born 1966), New Zealand golfer
- Rhana Devenport (born 1960), Australian-born art curator

== See also ==
- Davenport
- Devonport
