= MLW RS-23 =

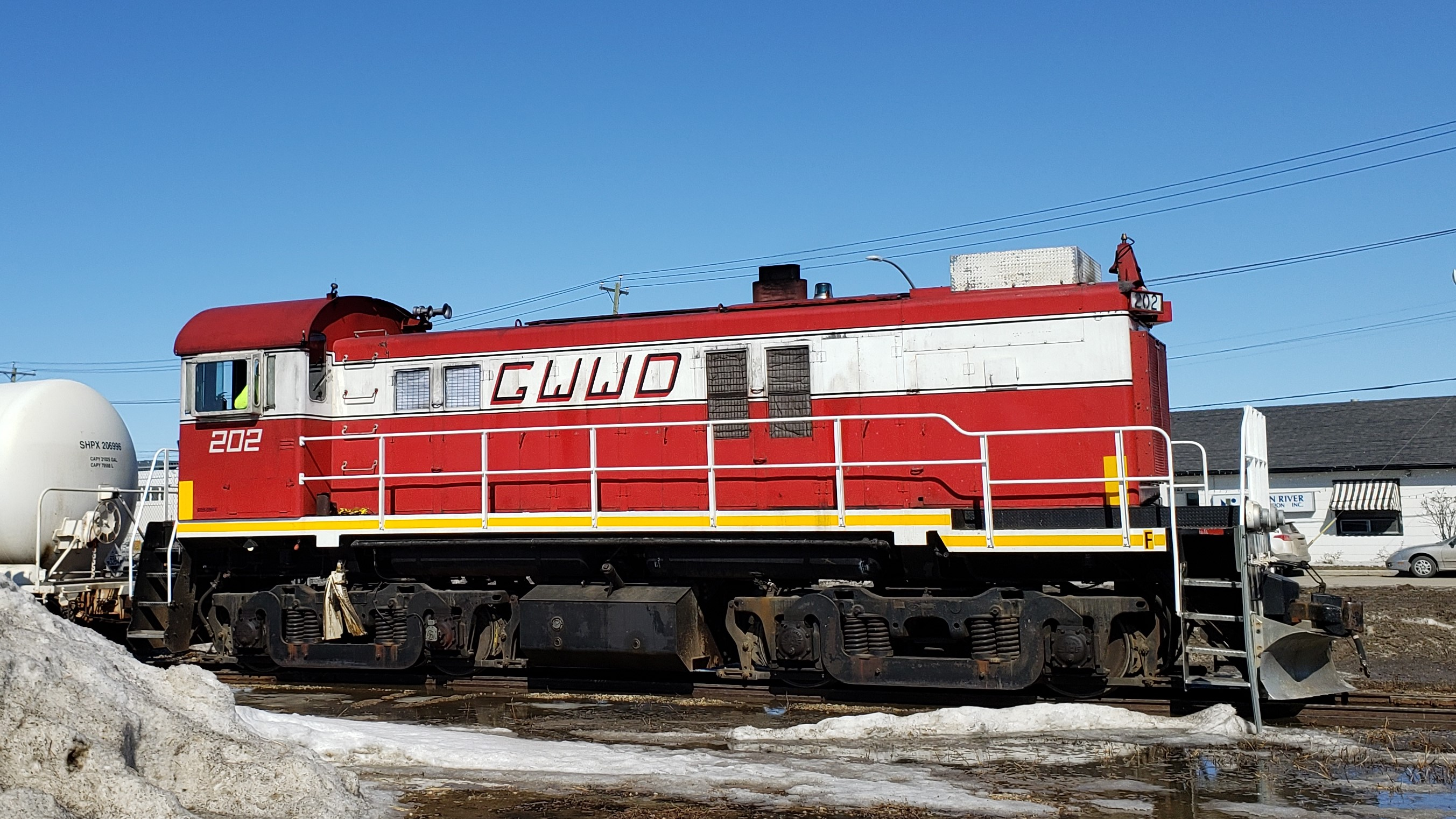
- GWWD 202 in Winnipeg on March 21, 2019.
Type and origin
- Power type: Diesel-electric
- Builder: Montreal Locomotive Works
- Model: RS-23
- Build date: August 1959 to September 1960
- Total produced: 40
Specifications
- Configuration
  - AAR: B-B
  - UIC: Bo'Bo'
- Gauge: 4 ft 8 1/2 in (1,435 mm)
- Prime mover: ALCO 6-251C
- RPM range: 1025 / 325
- Engine type: Four-stroke diesel
- Generator: DC generator
- Traction motors: 4 x GE 752 DC traction motors
- Transmission: Electric
- Loco brake: Air, optional dynamic
- Train brakes: Air
Performance figures
- Power output: 1,000 hp (750 kW)
Career
- Locale: Canada and United States

The MLW RS-23 was a 1,000 hp (746 kW) diesel-electric locomotive built by Montreal Locomotive Works between August 1959 and September 1960. Production totaled 40 locomotives.

The largest fleet of these locomotives was operated by Canadian Pacific Railway, which classed them DRS-10c in that company's locomotive classification system.

== Original owners ==
Image	Railway	Quantity	Road number	Notes
	Canadian Pacific Railway	34	8013–8046	
	Sydney and Louisburg Railway	3	200–202	All to GWWD, retaining their road numbers.
	Texas Gulf Sulphur Company	3	3457-01-3457-03	
	Totals	40		

== See also ==
- List of MLW diesel locomotives
