= Davenport station (Ontario) =

Railway station in Toronto, Ontario, Canada

Coordinates: 43.6723°N 79.4525°W

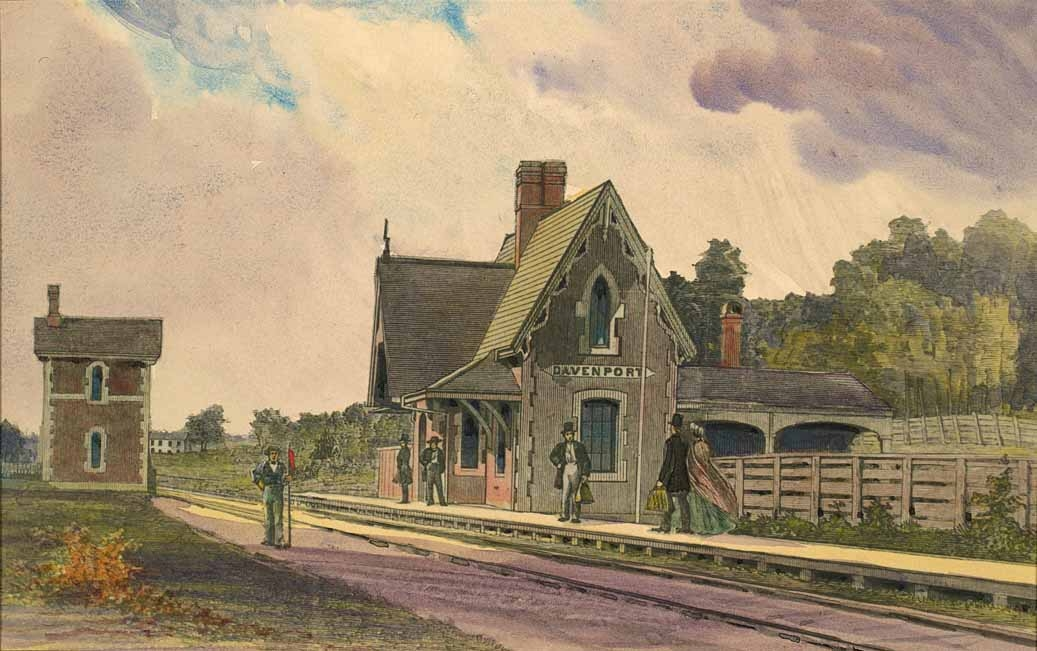
The 2nd Davenport Station, in 1863.

The Davenport railway station was first constructed in 1853 on the Ontario, Simcoe and Huron Railway, the first railway in Ontario, Canada. The original building was replaced by a brick station in 1857. It was located on Caledonia Park Road, just north of Davenport Road, in the former community of Davenport, a former satellite community of Toronto, Ontario that has long since been annexed into Toronto.

The station lay south of a scarp marking the ancient shoreline of glacial Lake Iroquois, and at the edge of the bay at the mouth of the Humber River.

It was demolished shortly after the construction of the St. Clair Avenue Station in 1932.

Preceding station	Via Rail	Following station
Newmarket toward Vancouver	Super Continental	Toronto Terminus
Former services at St. Clair Avenue
Preceding station	Canadian National Railway	Following station
Downsview toward North Bay	North Bay – Toronto	Parkdale toward Toronto
