= Goderich–Exeter Railway =

Short line railway in Ontario, Canada

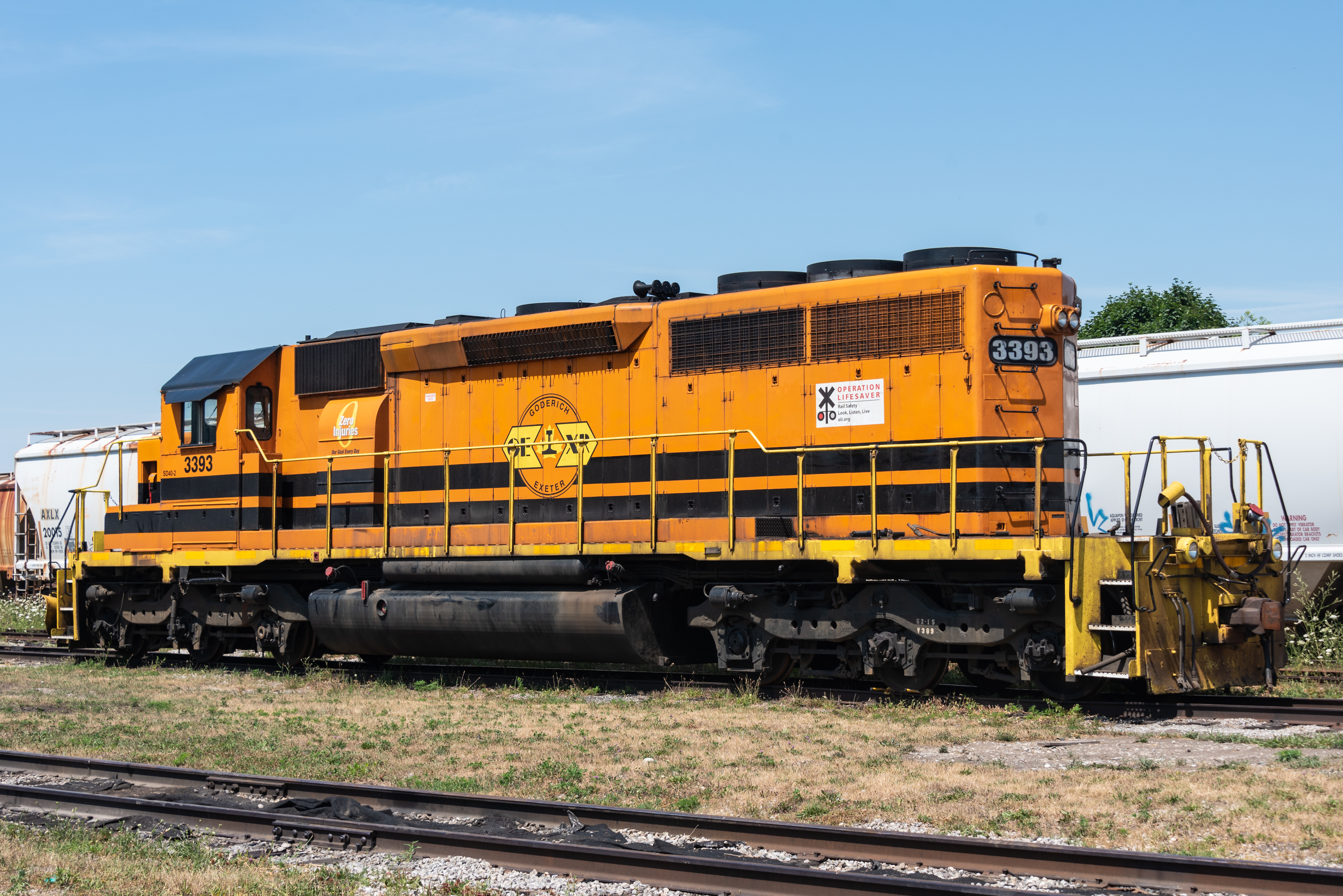
- GEXR #3393, a EMD SD40-2 locomotive, in Goderich-Exeter Railway colours.

Overview
- Headquarters: Stratford, Ontario
- Reporting mark: GEXR
- Locale: Southwestern Ontario
- Dates of operation: 1992–Present
- Predecessor: Canadian National Railway

Technical
- Track gauge: 4 ft 8 1/2 in (1,435 mm) standard gauge
- Length: 77 miles (124 km)

Other
- Website: Goderich-Exeter Railway

The Goderich–Exeter Railway (reporting mark GEXR) is a short line freight railway that operates 77 miles (124 km) of track in Southwestern Ontario, Canada. Created in 1992, it was the third short line railway in Canada (after Central Western Railway in Alberta (1986) and Southern Rails Cooperative in Saskatchewan (1989)) to be purchased from a class I railway, in this case Canadian National Railway (CN). It took over operation of further CN trackage in 1998. As of 2004, the railway had 44 employees. Its headquarters are in Stratford, Ontario, and owned by short-line railroad holding company Genesee & Wyoming.

== History ==
The Goderich–Exeter Railway was created in 1992 by its owner, RailTex (subsequently purchased by RailAmerica in 2000, and Genesee & Wyoming in late 2012), to operate over Canadian National Railway's Goderich Subdivision, 46 miles (74 km) of track between Stratford and Goderich, Ontario; and its Exeter Subdivision, 24 miles (39 km) of track between Centralia, Ontario and Clinton Jct. that was acquired from CN. The railway started operation on 3 April 1992. On 15 November 1998, the Goderich–Exeter Railway took over operation of CN's Guelph Subdivision, which runs over 89 miles (143 km) between Silver Junction (in Georgetown) and London, Ontario.

The railway had expressed an interest in acquiring the former CN branchline from Stratford to Owen Sound, but was unable to do so as a result of changes to Ontario labour law which made the acquisition uneconomic.

After a 21-year lease to GEXR, CN took over GEXR's yards and the Guelph Subdivision on 15 November 2018. Metrolinx assumed ownership and responsibility for the Guelph Sub from Georgetown to Kitchener. However, GEXR still runs on the Goderich and Exeter Subdivision.

On 1 February 2021, train 581 ran away down the hill in Goderich, Ontario. It hit a pickup truck, a semi truck and a shed. Some cars and the locomotives derailed as a result.

== Freight services ==
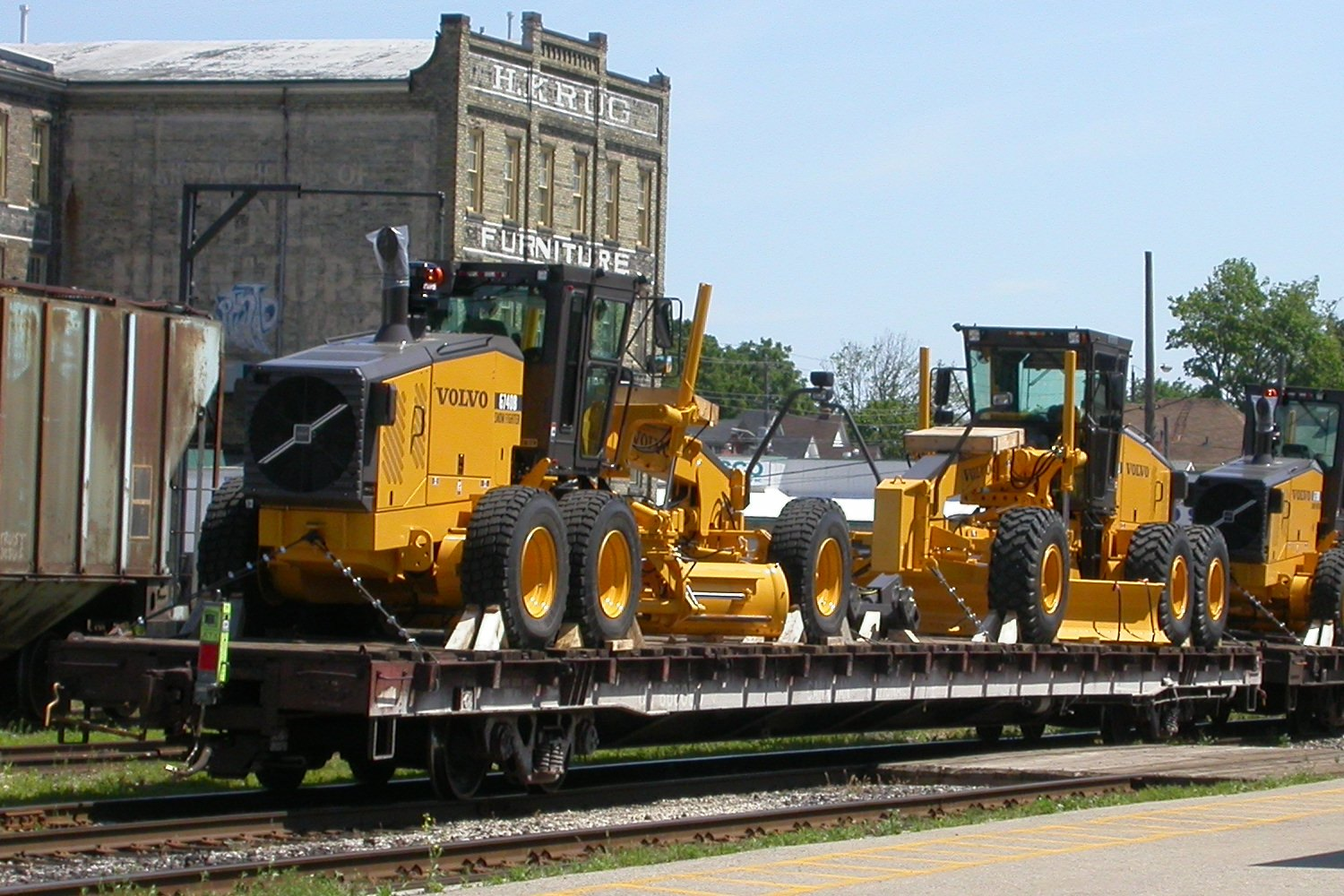
One of GEXR's former customers was Volvo Motor Graders in Goderich.

The railway handles around 25,000 carloads of freight annually, consisting mainly of automobile parts, salt and fertilizer, wheat, grains, soy meal and rice. From Stratford the line serves the east west corridor of Huron and Perth Counties serving Mitchell, Dublin, Seaforth, Clinton, and Goderich. There is also a spur line running south from Clinton, serving, Brucefield, Hensall, Exeter, and Centralia.

Traffic on the Goderich Subdivision mainly consists of agricultural products and salt from the Sifto Canada salt mines in Goderich, and construction equipment produced by a Volvo Motor Graders plant in Goderich (closed 2010). It also connects with the port facility at the Port of Goderich.

As of 29 August 2020, GEXR operates on the Guelph Junction Railway.

=== Interchanges ===
The Goderich–Exeter Railway interchanges with CN in Stratford yard.

== Locomotives ==
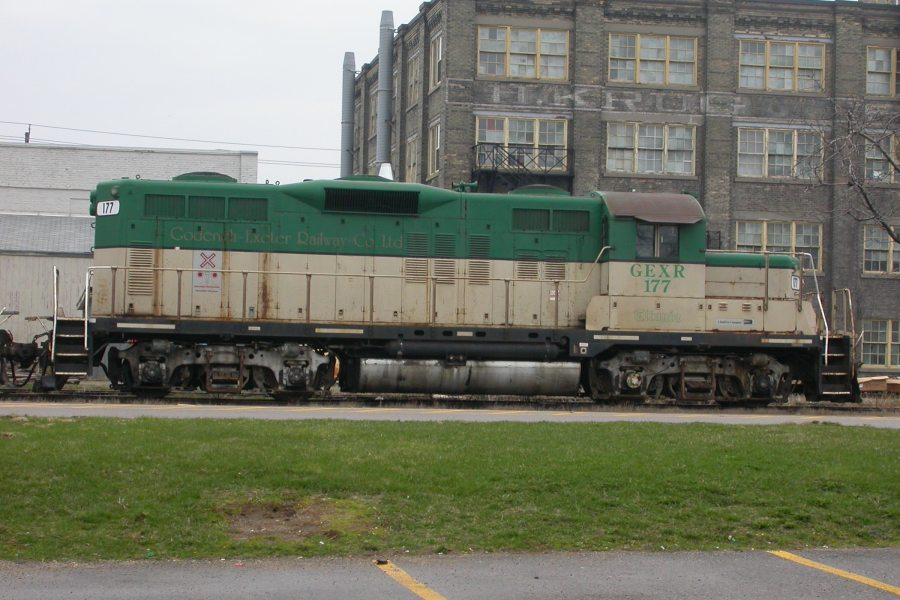
GEXR 177, "Titania", an EMD GP9.

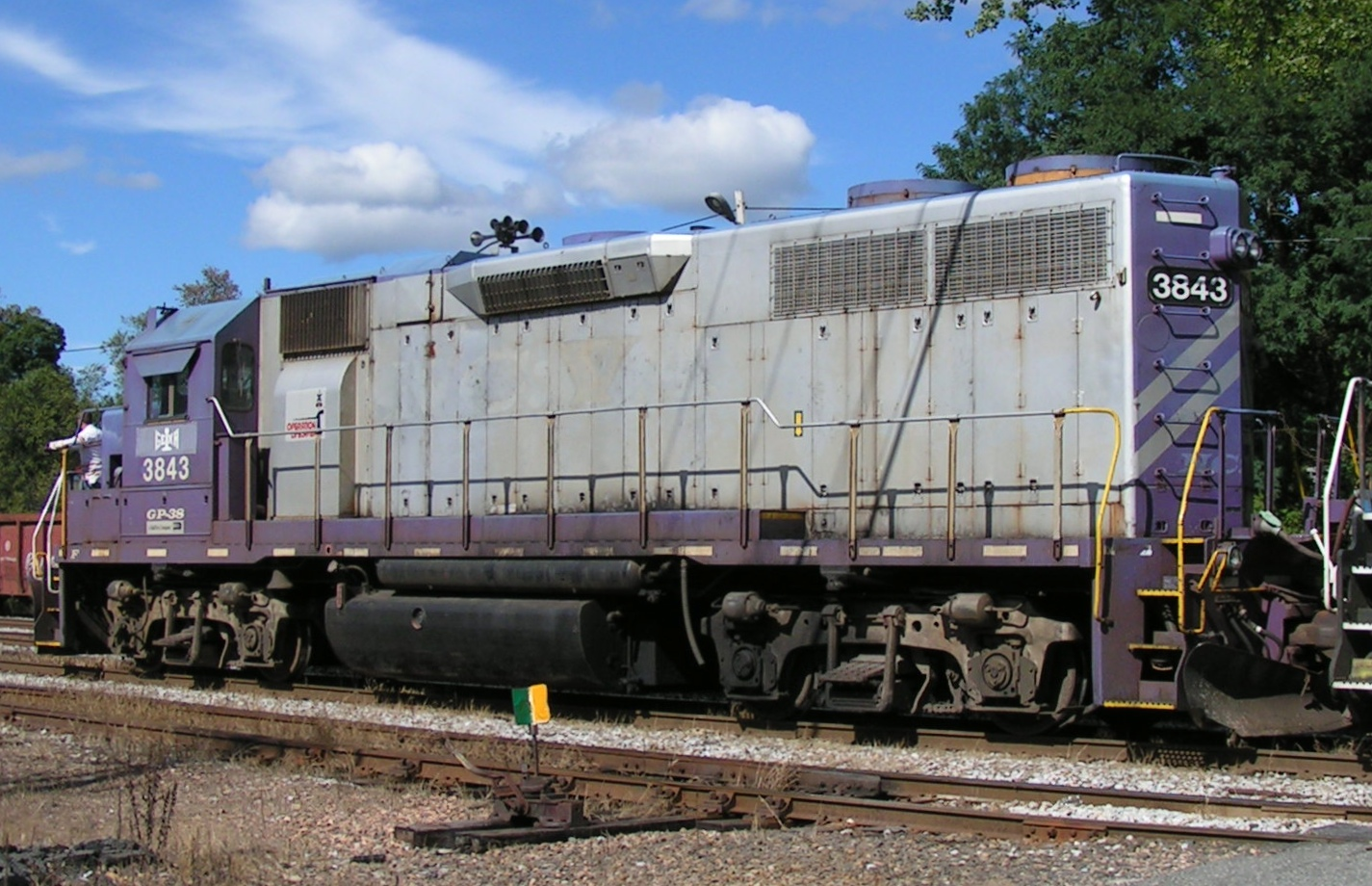
GEXR #3843, an EMD GP38AC.

As of 2017, the railway owned 13 locomotives, which were acquired used. Its first four locomotives, purchased between 1992 and 1994, were given names of Shakespearean characters (#177 was named "Titania", #178 "Paulina", #179 "Portia", and #180 "Falstaff"), as Stratford is the home of the Canadian Shakespearean Festival. Units 178, 179, and 180 have since been sold to other railways. GEXR was acquired by Genesee & Wyoming in 2012. The railway also leases a few locomotives. All of its locomotives were made by General Motors Electro-Motive Division and include EMD GP38s, EMD GP35s, EMD GP40s, and EMD SD40-2s. As of March 2017, some of its locomotives are owned by subsidiaries of Genesee & Wyoming.

=== Roster ===
List of GEXR's active units on home rails (as of December 2024)

EMD GP38-2 RLHH 2111, née SOU 5058 (High Nose) - working GEXR 581

EMD GP38-2 HESR 3510, née UP 2108 - working GEXR 581

EMD GP35 2500, built in March 1965 Nee QRGY 2500 - stationed in Goderich, purchased by GiO Rail for rebuild (scrap condition)

EMD GP9 RLK 4001, née SP 3708 - stationed in Goderich, purchased by GiO rail for rebuild (scrap condition)

== See also ==
- Ion rapid transit
