= EMD F9 =

Model of 1750 hp North American diesel cab locomotive

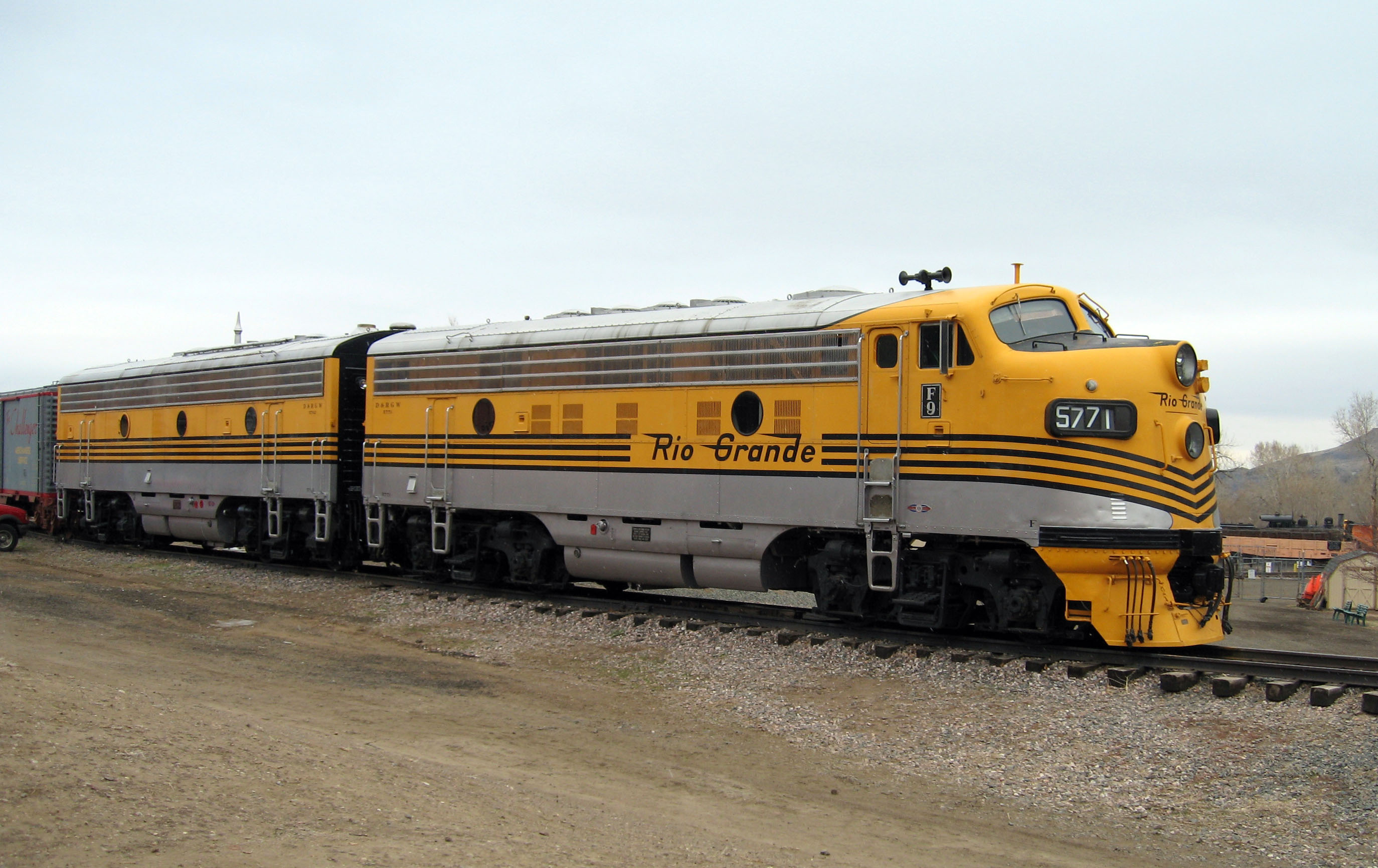
- D&RGW F9 #5771 in 2009. Note the carbody filter grille ahead of the front porthole, the only reliable distinguishing feature of an F9.
Type and origin
- Power type: Diesel-electric
- Builder: General Motors Electro-Motive Division (EMD); General Motors Diesel (GMD, Canada)
- Model: F9
- Build date: February 1953 – May 1960
- Total produced: 92 A units, 156 B units
Specifications
- Configuration
  - AAR: B-B
- Gauge: 4 ft 8 1/2 in (1,435 mm) standard gauge
- Trucks: Blomberg B
- Wheel diameter: 40 in (1,016 mm)
- Minimum curve: 23° (250.79 ft or 76.44 m radius)
- Wheelbase: 39 ft (11.89 m)
- Length: A unit, 50 ft 8 in (15.44 m) B unit, 50 ft 0 in (15.24 m)
- Width: 10 ft 8 in (3.25 m)
- Height: 15 ft (4.57 m)
- Prime mover: EMD 16-567C
- RPM range: 275-835
- Engine type: V16 Two-stroke diesel
- Aspiration: Roots blower
- Displacement: 9,072 cu in (148.66 L; 32.70 imp gal)
- Cylinders: 16
- Cylinder size: 8 1/2 in × 10 in (216 mm × 254 mm)
Performance figures
- Maximum speed: 65–105 mph (105–169 km/h)
- Power output: 1,750 hp (1.30 MW)
Career
- Locale: North America

The EMD F9 is a 1,750 horsepower (1,300 kW) Diesel-electric locomotive produced between February 1953 and May 1960 by the Electro-Motive Division of General Motors (EMD) and General Motors Diesel (GMD). It succeeded the F7 model in GM-EMD's F-unit sequence. Final assembly was at GM-EMD's La Grange, Illinois plant. The F9 was also built in Canada by General Motors Diesel at their London, Ontario plant. A total of 92 cab-equipped lead A units and 156 cabless booster B units were built. The F9 was the fifth model in GM-EMD's highly successful "F" series of cab unit diesel locomotives.

By the time cab units such as the F9 were built, railroads were turning to the road switcher-style of locomotive, as they had much better visibility from the cab without the need to lean out the window. The F9 was succeeded in most part by the EMD GP9.

== Engine and powertrain ==
The F9 used a 16-cylinder 567C series Diesel engine developing 1,750 hp (1.30 MW) at 800 rpm. The 567 was designed specifically for locomotive applications, being a 45 degree V-type two-stroke design, with 567 cu in (9.29 L) displacement per cylinder, for a total of 9,072 cu in (148.66 L). A D.C. generator powered four D37 traction motors, two on each Blomberg B truck. EMD has built all of its major components since 1939.

== Identification ==
An F9 can be distinguished reliably from a late F7 only by the addition of an extra filter grille ahead of the front porthole on the side panels on A units. Internally, the use of an 567C prime mover increased power to 1,750 hp (1.30 MW) from the F7's 1,500 hp (1.12 MW).

== Original owners ==
EMD built 248 F9 locomotives: 92 A units and 156 B units. Nine railroads purchased A units; all but one of these purchased B units. Six railroads purchased B units only. The most significant buyer was the Northern Pacific Railway, which purchased 38 A units and 32 B units. Other significant buyers included the Canadian National Railway (38 B units), the Atchison, Topeka and Santa Fe Railway (18 of each), and the Denver and Rio Grande Western Railroad purchased 2 A units and 4 B units. Locomotives intended for use in Canada were built by General Motors Diesel, EMD's Canadian subsidiary. These included the Canadian National's order, and eight B units for the Canadian Pacific Railway.

== See also ==
- EMD FP9
- EMD FL9
- List of GM-EMD locomotives
- List of GMD Locomotives

== Bibliography ==
- Cook, Preston (Spring 2015). "F Units, T to 9". Classic Trains. pp. 20–35. ISSN 1527-0718.
- Lamb, J. Parker (2007). Evolution of the American Diesel Locomotive. Railroads Past and Present. Bloomington, Indiana: Indiana University Press. ISBN 978-0-253-34863-0.
- Marre, Louis A. (1995). Diesel Locomotives: The First 50 Years: A Guide to Diesels Built Before 1972. Railroad Reference Series. Waukesha, Wisconsin: Kalmbach Publishing. ISBN 978-0-89024-258-2.
- Pinkepank, Jerry A. (1973). The Second Diesel Spotter's Guide. Milwaukee, Wisconsin: Kalmbach Publishing. ISBN 978-0-89024-026-7.
- Schafer, Mike (1998). Vintage Diesel Locomotives. Enthusiast Color Series. Osceola, Wisconsin: MBI Publishing. ISBN 978-0-7603-0507-2.
- Solomon, Brian (2000). The American Diesel Locomotive. Osceola, Wisconsin: MBI Publishing Company. ISBN 978-0-7603-0666-6.
- Solomon, Brian (2005). EMD F-Unit Locomotives. North Branch, Minnesota: Specialty Press. ISBN 978-1-58007-192-5.
- Solomon, Brian (2006). EMD Locomotives. St. Paul, Minnesota: Voyageur Press. ISBN 978-0-7603-2396-0.
- Solomon, Brian (2010). Vintage Diesel Power. Minneapolis, Minnesota: MBI Publishing. ISBN 978-0-7603-3795-0.
- Solomon, Brian (2011). Electro-Motive E-Units and F-Units: The Illustrated History of North America's Favorite Locomotives. Minneapolis, Minnesota: Voyageur Press. ISBN 978-0-7603-4007-3.
- Solomon, Brian (2012). North American Locomotives: A Railroad-by-Railroad Photohistory. Minneapolis, Minnesota: Voyageur Press. ISBN 978-0-7603-4370-8.
- Wilson, Jeff (1999). F Units: The Diesels That Did It. Golden Years of Railroading. Waukesha, Wisconsin: Kalmbach Publishing. ISBN 978-0-89024-374-9.
- Wilson, Jeff (2017). Guide to North American Diesel Locomotives. Waukesha, Wisconsin: Kalmbach Publishing. ISBN 978-1-62700-455-8.
