= Davenport Creek =

Stream in Cache County, Utah, U.S.

Coordinates: 41.5041028°N 111.8154963°W

Davenport Creek is a stream in Cache County, Utah, United States. It is also located within the Uinta-Wasatch-Cache National Forest and its mouth is about 2 miles (3.2 km) southeast of Avon. The creek rises in the Bear River Mountains (at a point about 500 feet [150 m] west of the border with Weber County) and flows briefly southwest. It then turns northwest and runs in that direction for most of its course before emptying into the South Fork Little Bear River at a point immediately west of Utah State Route 162. (The Little Bear River in turn, flows roughly north-northeast, through the Hyrum Reservoir, until it reaches the Bear River in the Cutler Reservoir. The Bear River then flows south to the Great Salt Lake.) The main tributaries of Davenport Creek are Pole Creek, Bald Head Creek, Smith Creek, and Fish Creek.

Davenport Creek was named for James Davenport, a lumberman.

== See also ==
- List of rivers of Utah
