= Davenport Hotel =

Davenport Hotel may refer to:

- The Davenport Hotel (Dublin), Ireland
- Davenport Hotel (Davenport, Iowa), a Registered Historical Place
- Davenport Hotel (Franklin Township, Michigan), a Registered Historical Place in Franklin Township, Michigan
- The Davenport Hotel (Spokane, Washington), a Registered Historical Place
  - The Davenport Hotel Collection, a parental operating brand which also includes sister properties
