= Creationist museum =

Facility that hosts exhibits to present a young Earth creationist view

A creationist museum is a facility that hosts exhibits which use the established natural history museum format to present a young Earth creationist view that the Earth and life on Earth were created some 6,000 to 10,000 years ago in six days. These facilities generally promote pseudoscientific biblical literalist creationism and contest evolutionary science. Their claims are dismissed by the scientific community.

== Australia ==
- Jurassic Ark, located in Bells Bridge, Gympie, Queensland.

== Canada ==
- Big Valley Creation Science Museum, located in Big Valley, Alberta.
- Creation Truth Ministries Travelling Museum, located in Red Deer, Alberta.

== China ==
- Noah's Ark, located in Hong Kong.

== Mexico ==
- Waldemar Julsrud Museum, located in Acámbaro.

== United Kingdom ==
- Creation Research Centre, located in Oswestry, Shropshire.
- Genesis Expo, located in Portsmouth, Hampshire.
- Noah's Ark Zoo Farm, located in Wraxall, Somerset, whilst not strictly speaking a museum, represents creationism as scientific fact.

== United States ==
=== California ===
- Cabazon Dinosaurs, located in Cabazon, California, are best known for their appearance in the film Pee Wee's Big Adventure. When the attraction's original owner died in 2005, the roadside dinosaurs were sold and turned into a museum promoting creationism. Unlike other creationist museums, the materials at this museum argue that dinosaurs still exist today.
- Museum of Creation and Earth History, located in Santee, California, was originally part of the Institute for Creation Research. The museum, established shortly after its parent in 1970, moved to its current site in the mid-1980s. The museum presents the view that all humans are descendants of the first humans created by God some six to ten thousand years ago and that a worldwide flood left behind beds of fossils that can be found all around the world, including on high plateaus and mountain ranges. The museum displays portraits of people the museum identifies as evolutionists, such as Andrew Carnegie – who is described as "cruel and heartless in his own day to competitors and laborers alike" – along with Karl Marx and Adolf Hitler.

=== Florida ===
- A Key Encounter Theater, located in Key West, Florida.
- Creation Adventures Museum, located in Arcadia, Florida.
- Creation Discovery Museum, located in Ft. Lauderdale, Florida.

=== Idaho ===
- Northwest Science Museum, founded 2014 in Boise, Idaho

=== Kentucky ===
- Creation Museum, located in Petersburg, Kentucky, opened in 2007 and constructed at a cost of $27 million, includes exhibits of Adam and Eve in the Garden of Eden accompanied by dinosaurs. Fossils are said to have been created in the biblical flood during the days of Noah. Plans for the museum date back to 1996.
- Ark Encounter is a Christian theme park that opened in Grant County, Kentucky on July 7, 2016. The centerpiece of the park is a full-scale model of Noah's Ark from the Genesis flood narrative in the Bible which is 510 feet (160 m) long, 85 feet (26 m) wide, and 81 feet (25 m) high. The park also includes a petting zoo. Ark Encounter is operated by Answers in Genesis (AiG).

=== Missouri ===
- Creation Experience Museum, located in Branson, Missouri.

=== Montana ===
- Glendive Dinosaur and Fossil Museum located in Glendive, Montana.

=== Nebraska ===
- Boneyard Creation Museum, located in Broken Bow, Nebraska.

=== New York ===
- Lost World Museum, located in Phoenix, New York, features odd creatures in its creationist exhibits, including a one-eyed kitten and a supposed chupacabra from Texas.

=== North Carolina ===
- Creation Museum, Taxidermy Hall of Fame of North Carolina, and Antique Tool Museum, located in Southern Pines, North Carolina.

=== Ohio ===
- Akron Fossils & Science Center, located in Akron/Copley, Ohio.

=== Oklahoma ===
- Museum of Creation Truth, located in Bokchito, Oklahoma.

=== South Dakota ===
- Grand River Museum, located in Lemmon, South Dakota.

=== Tennessee ===
- Wyatt Museum, located in Cornersville, Tennessee.

=== Texas ===
- Creation Evidence Museum, located in Glen Rose, Texas.
- ICR Discovery Center for Science & Earth History, located in Dallas, Texas, operated by the Institute for Creation Research
- Mt. Blanco Fossil Museum, located in Crosbyton, Texas.
- Museum of Earth History, located in Dallas, Texas, was described by The Guardian as "first dinosaur museum to take a creationist perspective" and was constructed as a joint venture of the Creation Truth Foundation and the Great Passion Play outdoor Biblical theme park, which attracts over seven million visitors a year to its 4,500-seat arena. Among the high-quality replica casts of dinosaurs are exhibits showing dinosaurs coexisting in the Garden of Eden with Adam and Eve. The museum asserts that most dinosaurs became extinct during the Great Flood, and that while a pair of young dinosaurs accompanied elephants and lions on Noah's Ark, these became extinct later.

=== Washington ===
- Mount St. Helens Creation Information Center, located in Castle Rock, Washington near Mount St. Helens, uses the volcano's 1980 eruption to show that geologic change can happen on a rapid scale, and that changes believed by mainstream scientists to take millions of years can occur in as short a period of time as hours or days.

== See also ==
- History of Earth
- Timeline of human evolution
