= Alberta Prairie Railway Excursions =

Heritage railway in Alberta, Canada

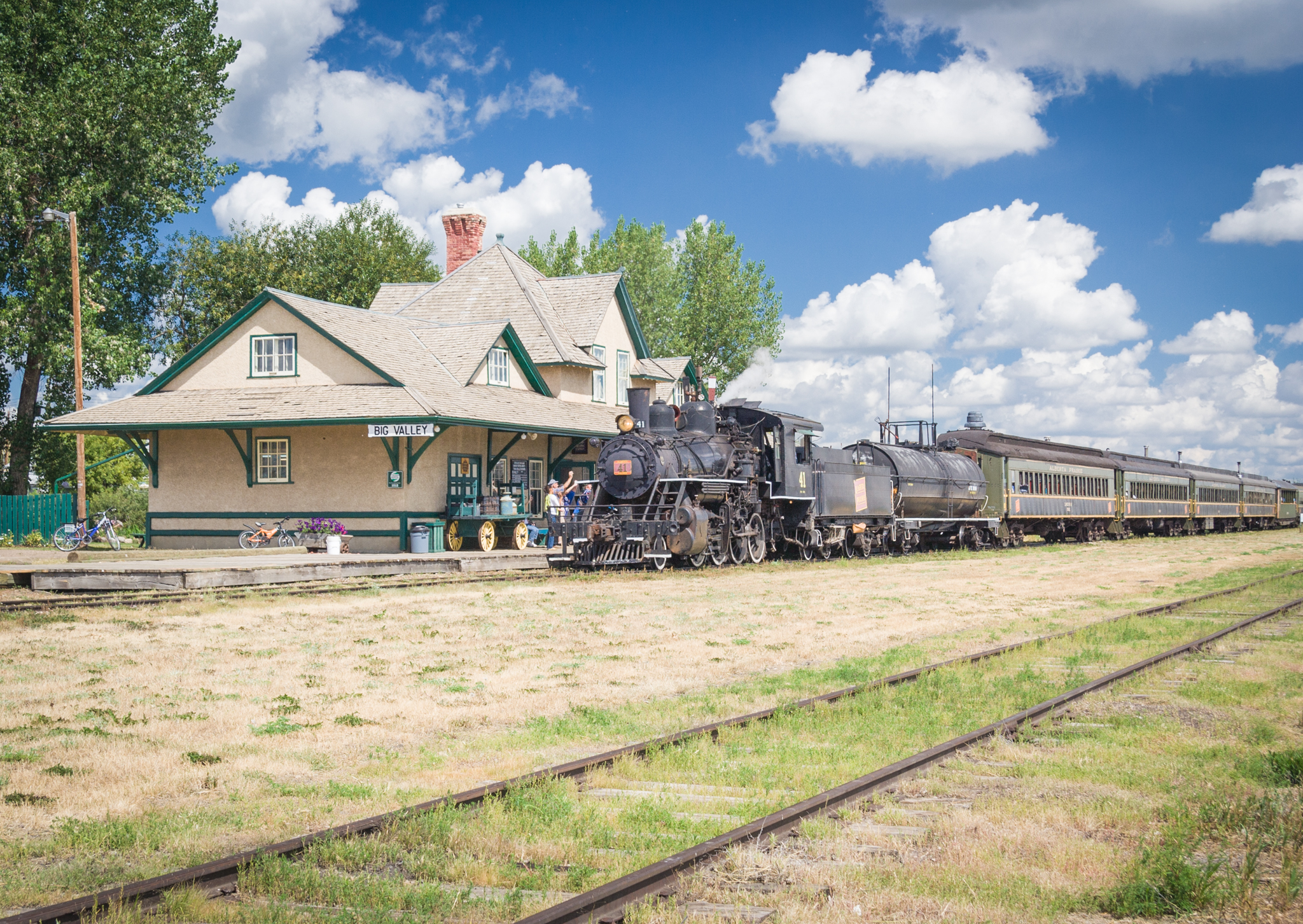
- Alberta Prairie Railway locomotive No. 41 arrives at Big Valley station, August 6, 2007
- Locale: Alberta
- Terminus: Stettler, Alberta, Canada
- Coordinates: 52.3216°N 112.7002°W

Commercial operations
- Built by: Canadian Northern Railway
- Original gauge: 4 ft 8 1/2 in (1,435 mm)

Preserved operations
- Owned by: Alberta Prairie Railway Excursions
- Operated by: Alberta Prairie Railway Excursions
- Reporting mark: APXX
- Stations: 2
- Length: 34.1 km (21.2 mi)
- Preserved gauge: 4 ft 8 1/2 in (1,435 mm)

Commercial history
- Opened: 1990

Preservation history
- Headquarters: Stettler, Alberta

Website
- http://www.absteamtrain.com/

Alberta Prairie Railway Excursions (reporting mark APXX) is a heritage railway originating in Stettler, Alberta, Canada.

== History ==
The Alberta Prairie Railway began operations in 1990. The train runs between Stettler and Big Valley. The trips last five to six hours, with a stopover (all excursions include a buffet meal). Many trains are pulled by No. 41, a 1920 Baldwin 2-8-0 steam locomotive, and sometimes by CN U-1-f No. 6060, a Montreal Locomotive Works 4-8-2.

On days when the steamers are not running, the railroad operates diesel switcher SW-1200 No. 1259, GMD GMD1 No. 1118 and EMD GP9 No. 7438. Until the end of the railroad's 1999 season, it also operated on the 97-kilometre (60 mi) route to Coronation, Alberta, which is now abandoned.

== Equipment ==
Locomotive details
Number	Image	Type	Model	Built	Builder	Status
41		Steam	2-8-0	1920	Baldwin Locomotive Works	Operational
6060		Steam	4-8-2	1944	Montreal Locomotive Works	Undergoing overhaul
1118		Diesel	GMD1	1958	General Motors Diesel	Operational
1259		Diesel	SW-1200	1957	General Motors Diesel	Operational
7438		Diesel	GP9	1957	Electro-Motive Diesel	Operational

=== Visiting units ===
Locomotive details
Number	Image	Type	Model	Built	Builder	Status	Owner
1392		Steam	4-6-0	1913	Montreal Locomotive Works	Stored, awaiting repairs	Alberta Railway Museum

== See also ==
- List of heritage railways in Canada
- Rocky Mountain Rail Society
