= Rocky Mountain Rail Society =

Steam locomotive preservation group

Coordinates: 52.3216°N 112.7001°W

- Abbreviation: RMRS
- Founded: 1984
- Type: Non-Profit
- Purpose: Preservation of Canadian National Railway steam locomotive No. 6060
- Location: Calgary, Alberta, Canada
- Region served: Stettler, Alberta
- Products: Book of pictures of steam locomotive 6060
- Members: 11
- Volunteers: 20
- Website: www.6060.org

The Rocky Mountain Rail Society (RMRS) is a registered non-profit organization of volunteers dedicated to the preservation of Canadian National Railway steam locomotive 6060, The Spirit of Alberta. Their goal is to ensure that The Spirit of Alberta remains in full and complete operating condition for the enjoyment of steam rail fans.

== Society structure and team members ==
The Rocky Mountain Rail Society operates under a board of directors and a varying number of directors. The key mechanical positions that make up the Mechanical Committee are chief mechanical officer, assistant to the chief mechanical officer and rolling stock operations officer. All planning for repairs, modifications and maintenance of any RMRS equipment must be done in consultation with and under the approval of the Mechanical Committee. A volunteer coordinator is also appointed to manage all volunteer resources and scheduling.

=== Team member roles ===
- Chief mechanical officer – Responsible for the planning, scheduling and expenditure of all repairs and maintenance. Reports to the board of directors.
- Assistant to the chief mechanical officer – responsible for the planning, scheduling and expenditure of all repairs and maintenance when the chief mechanical officer is not available to fill these duties. Reports to the board of directors.
- Rolling stock operations officer – responsible for the planning, scheduling and expenditure of all repairs and maintenance required on RMRS rolling stock. Reports to the board of directors.
- Volunteer coordinator – responsible for managing volunteer resources with respect to training and scheduling.
- Volunteer workers – responsible for conducting work on the locomotives and rolling stock under the direction of the Mechanical Committee and Volunteer Coordinator.

== Society operation ==
From 1998 to 2011, the society's excursions consisted of providing 6060 as steam power to a number of runs of Alberta Prairie Railway (APR) tourist trains which were operated on a regular weekend schedule from mid-May to mid-October. (Special event runs also occurred at other dates in the year). The railway normally used its own steam locomotive, number 41, or a diesel for these runs. Several days each summer RMRS provided 6060 as power. The trips occurred along a line built by the Canadian Northern Railway between Stettler and Big Valley in Alberta, Canada. The length of this run is 77 km (48 mi) round trip. As there was no capacity to turn locomotives at Big Valley, 6060 ran in reverse to that location, and then returned in a forward direction to Stettler.

== History of CNR 6060 ==
Canadian National 6060 (affectionately known as Bullet-nosed Betty) was assembled in Canada's Montreal Locomotive Works in October 1944 under builder's number 72757. In 1959, 6060 was retired from active service and was subsequently placed on static display in Jasper, Alberta, in 1962. Ten years later, Canadian National Railway restored 6060 to operating condition, and used her to haul steam excursions out of Toronto, Ontario.

In 1980, to commemorate the Province of Alberta's 75th anniversary, No. 6060 was presented to the people of Alberta as a gift. After more than five years of retirement, she was restored a second time with the help of the Province of Alberta and, most notably, volunteers from the Rocky Mountain Rail Society. No. 6060 travelled under its own power to Vancouver, British Columbia, on May 2, 1986 to participate in the Steam Expo, part of the World's Fair.

In November 1991, No. 6060's Alberta owners announced that they could no longer take care of the locomotive, and they sought to move No. 6060 to a park for permanent static display, while the New York, Susquehanna and Western Railway made an offer to buy it for their steam program. The Rocky Mountain Rail Society was determined to keep No. 6060 from leaving Canada and to become a static display piece, so they launched a campaign for the Provincial Government to reconsider No. 6060's future. This led to the province relinquishing the title of No. 6060 to the Rocky Mountain Rail Society in early 1992.

After several years of storage at the Alberta Railway Museum near Edmonton, No. 6060 was moved to Stettler in 1998 to operate regularly in the service of Alberta Prairie Steam Tours. It continued to transport thousands of excursion passengers until being taken out of service in 2011 due to boiler issues. This mountain-type engine is considered to be one of the best examples of a modern steam locomotive, and until 2011 was Canada's largest operating steamer and North America's only operating mountain-type engine.

In 2020, overhaul work on No. 6060 officially began to return the locomotive to operating condition.

6060's design is an extension of CNR Northern U-2-g design (4-8-4) which was able to run through divisional points where other engines would need to be serviced, and established performance records. One such locomotive ran 29,536 km (18,353 mi) in one month, and it was typical for the design to run without change from Montreal, Quebec, to Halifax, Nova Scotia, for a total of 1,353 km (841 mi). As a result of being constructed during World War II when the need for more locomotives was high but the ready supply of iron was low, the U-1-f class of 4-8-2s, of which 6060 was the first, were lighter and more versatile locomotives than the U-2 Northerns. 6060 rolled off the erecting floor at Montreal Locomotive Works early in October 1944. In spite of being 20 tons lighter than the U-2s, the performance of the U-1-f class was undiminished and they quickly took over prestigious passenger runs, capable of easily maintaining speeds of 121 km/h (75 mph). 6078, a classmate of 6060, made the run from Toronto to Sarnia, Ontario, in two hours and fifty-eight minutes at an average speed (including water stops) of 94.5 km/h (58.7 mph). This entire sub-class of engine remained in service until the end of steam on the CNR.

== See also ==
- CN U-1-f
- List of heritage railways in Canada
