= Earth Museum =

Earth Museum or Museum of the Earth may refer to:

- Museum of the Earth, a natural history museum in Ithaca, New York.
- Museum of the Earth, Polish Academy of Sciences, a natural history museum in Warsaw, Poland.
- Earth Sciences Museum, a geology museum in Rio de Janeiro, Brazil
- Sedgwick Museum of Earth Sciences, a geology museum at the University of Cambridge
- The Earth Museum, a Turkish science fiction anthology.
- Museum of Earth History, a creationist museum in Dallas Texas
