= Canadian National 1392 =

Preserved CN class H-6-g 4-6-0 locomotive

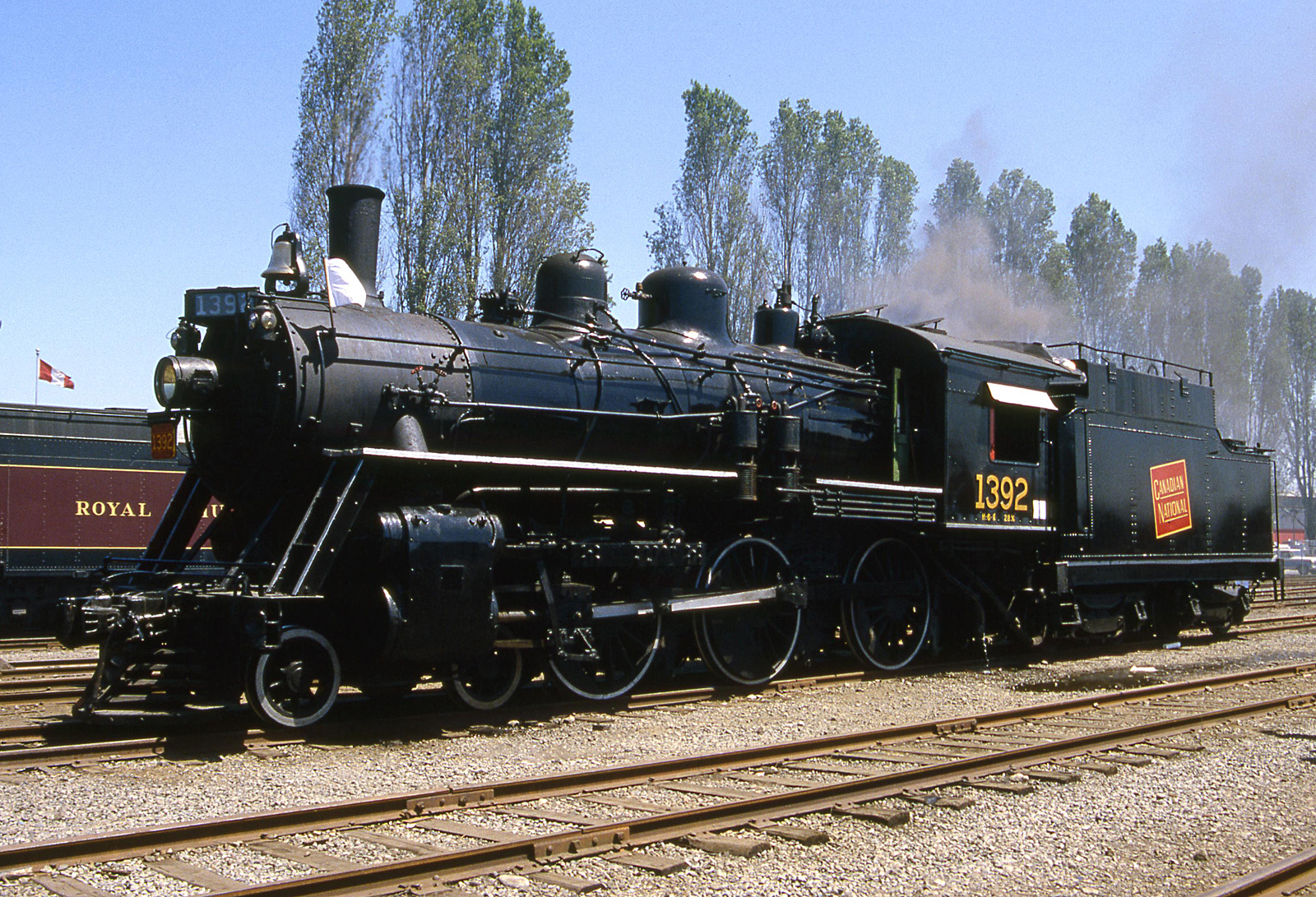
- No. 1392 taking part in Steam Expo at the 1986 World Exposition, June 1986
Type and origin
- Power type: Steam
- Builder: Montreal Locomotive Works
- Serial number: 52649
- Model: H-6-g
- Build date: April 1913
Specifications
- Configuration
  - Whyte: 4-6-0
  - UIC: 2′C
- Gauge: 4 ft 8 1/2 in (1,435 mm)
- Driver dia.: 63 in (1,600 mm)
- Wheelbase: 54.25 ft (16.54 m)
  - Engine: 24.83 ft (7.57 m)
  - Drivers: 14.50 ft (4.42 m)
- Length: 63 ft 6 1/2 in (19.37 m)
- Width: 10 ft 8 in (3.25 m)
- Height: 14 ft 10 1/2 in (4.53 m)
- Adhesive weight: 133,000 lb (60 t)
- Loco weight: 173,000 lb (78 t)
- Tender weight: 124,000 lb (56 t)
- Total weight: 297,000 lb (135 t)
- Fuel type: New: Coal; Now: Oil
- Fuel capacity: Coal: 11 long tons (11 t); Oil: 3,000 imp gal (14,000 L; 3,600 US gal)
- Water cap.: 6,000 imp gal (27,000 L; 7,200 US gal)
- Boiler pressure: 180 psi (1,200 kPa)
- Cylinders: Two, outside
- Cylinder size: 22 in × 26 in (560 mm × 660 mm)
- Valve gear: Walschaerts
- Valve type: Piston valves
- Loco brake: Air
- Train brakes: Air
- Couplers: Knuckle
Performance figures
- Tractive effort: 30,560 lbf (135.9 kN)
- Factor of adh.: 4.64
Career
- Operators: Canadian Northern Railway; Canadian National Railway; Alberta Railway Museum; Alberta Prairie Railway Excursions (leased)
- Class: H-6-g
- Numbers: CNoR 1392; CN 1392
- Retired: 1955
- Restored: 1974
- Current owner: Alberta Railway Museum
- Disposition: Stored, awaiting repairs

Canadian National 1392 is a preserved H-6-g class 4-6-0 "Ten-wheeler" type steam locomotive. It was built in April 1913 by the Montreal Locomotive Works (MLW) for the Canadian Northern Railway (CNoR) before it was absorbed into the Canadian National Railway (CN). No. 1392 became famous in later years for pulling a plethora of small excursion trains throughout Western Canada. As of 2026, the locomotive is owned and operated by the Alberta Railway Museum and is based in Edmonton, Alberta.

== History ==
=== Revenue service ===
No. 1392 was constructed by the Montreal Locomotive Works (MLW) in Montreal, Quebec, in April 1913, as one of fifty-six H-6-g class 4-6-0 "ten-wheeler" type locomotives built for the Canadian Northern Railway (CNoR), it was initially assigned to pull passenger trains throughout the Province of Alberta. In 1918, the CNoR merged with the Canadian Government Railways (and later the Grand Trunk Railway) to form the Canadian National Railway (CN), and No. 1392 and its classmates were subsequently relettered under the CN flag. The locomotive was reassigned by CN to pull passengers and mixed freight trains throughout various parts of Central and Western Canada. As larger locomotives were added to the roster, No. 1392 was reassigned once more to pull trains on branch lines in Alberta and Saskatchewan. In 1954, No. 1392 was converted to burn oil, as opposed to coal. No. 1392 was retired from revenue service in 1955 and it was thereafter donated to the City of Edmonton, who decided to move it to the Edmonton Exhibition grounds for static display.

=== Preservation ===
During its time on static display, No. 1392 was meticulously maintained by members of the Canadian Railroad Historical Association (CRHA) Rocky Mountain Branch, in order to remain as clean and presentable to the general public as possible. In 1969, the locomotive was acquired by the recently formed Alberta Pioneer Railway Association (APRA), and the locomotive was thereafter moved from the exhibition grounds to the Association's nearby location at the Edmonton Transit Service (ETS) Cromdale Car Barn with the hopes of restoring it to operational status, and restoration work began in 1972.

=== Excursion service ===
No. 1392's restoration was completed in 1974 and moved under its own steam for the first time under private ownership. The following year, 1975, the APRA relocated their equipment from the ETS car barn to a site that was part of CN's Coronado Subdivision. The site was opened to the public two years later, with No. 1392 being one of the locomotives to be used to pull the museum's regular short-distance tourist trains. In August 1976, No. 1392 visited the City of Lethbridge, Alberta to star in a feature film.

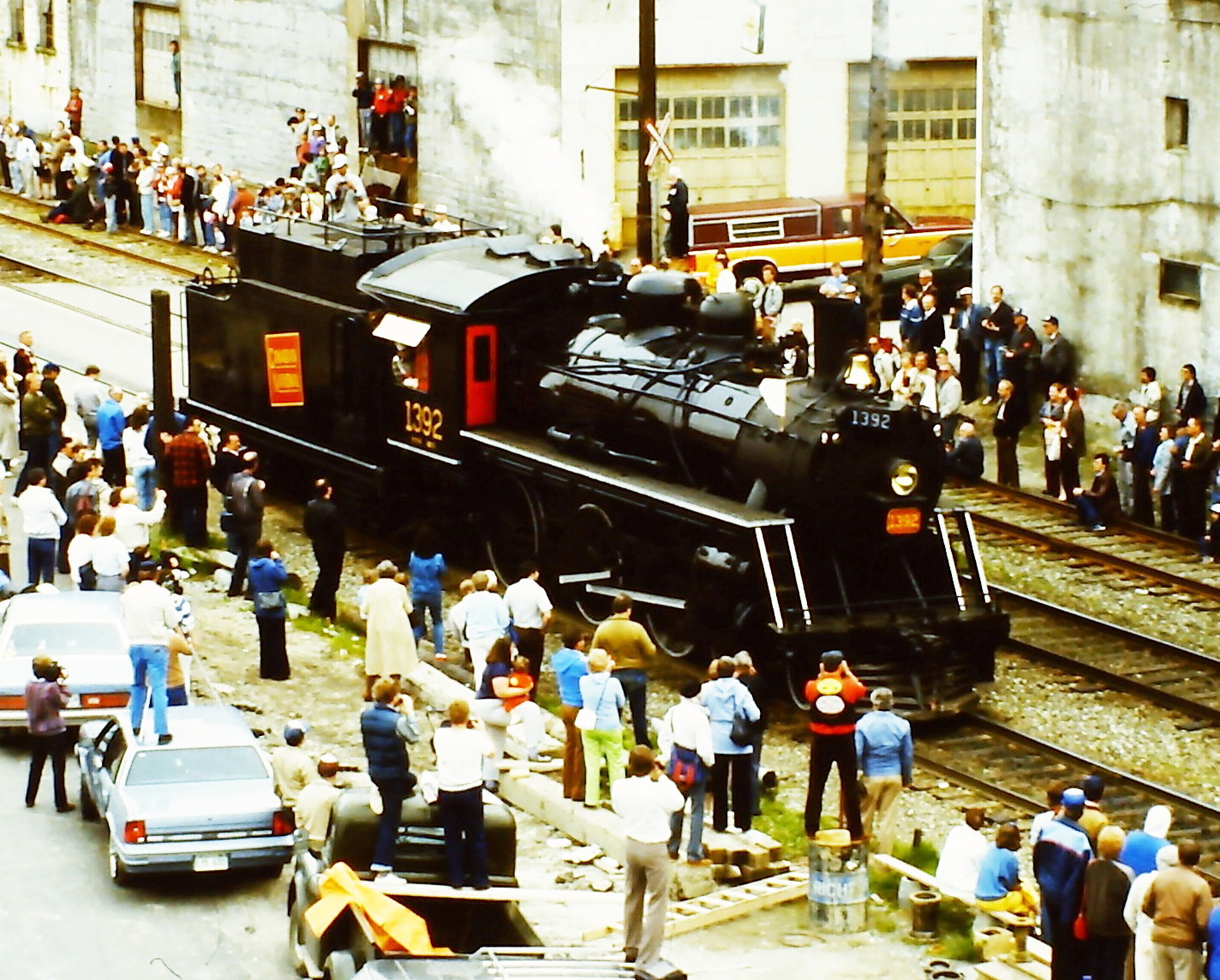
CN 1392 under steam during the Steam Expo event at Expo 86 in Vancouver.

The locomotive subsequently became one of the most popular attractions in the association's collection, and it was later joined by CN 4-8-2 "Mountain" type No. 6060. No. 1392 subsequently participated in several special events during its excursion career. During the 1986 World Exposition, No. 1392, along with No. 6060, was sent to Vancouver, British Columbia, to take part in the Steam Expo event, where a plethora of other steam locomotives also participated. Both locomotives returned to Edmonton, once the exposition was over. In 1993, the APRA, which by then changed its name to the Alberta Railway Museum (ARM), celebrated the 25th anniversary of its founding, and No. 1392 participated in the event. On October 14 and 15, 1995, No. 1392 took part in a doubleheader with No. 6060 on the museum grounds. The locomotive also participated in the 35th anniversary of the museum in 2003.

In 2005, during the centennial of Alberta becoming a province, No. 1392 pulled a commemorative excursion train through Slave Lake, McLennan, Peace River, Edmonton, and Boyle. In 2013, the ARM celebrated No. 1392's 100th birthday. In 2017, several events were held to celebrate the 150th anniversary of Canada, and the ARM celebrated by sending Nos. 1392 and 6060 to Alberta Prairie Railway Excursions' (APR) location in Stettler. In mid-June, No. 1392 and its tender were loaded on two separate flatbeds, and they were shipped by truck to Stettler. Between June 28 and July 5, No. 1392 pulled commemorative trains between Stettler and Big Valley alongside the APR's own steam locomotive, 2-8-0 "Consolidation" No. 41 (formerly Mississippian No. 77), while No. 6060 was put on display.

After the commemorations ended, Nos. 1392 and 6060 were both returned to Edmonton. In November 2017, No. 1392 was removed from service and disassembled in preparation for its mandated five-year inspection. The locomotive passed the inspection with a minimal amount of components required to be replaced. It was thereafter reassembled and repainted, and in July 2018, it returned to service to pull the ARM's tourist trains. In late 2019, however, No. 1392 was removed from service once more, due to leaky tubes inside its boiler. As of 2025, No. 1392 is sitting out of service, waiting for some minor repairs in order to operate again.

== Appearances in media ==
The No. 1392 locomotive has appeared in a few feature films and television shows since its return to service.

- No. 1392 was used to pull a freight train during filming of the 1978 drama film Days of Heaven, starring Richard Gere, Linda Manz, and Brooke Adams, and it was directed by Terrence Malick.
- No. 1392 pulls a short consist in the 1987 Western television film The Gunfighters, starring George Kennedy and Anthony Addabbo, and it was directed by Clay Borris.
- No. 1392 was briefly filmed for the 1989 independent film Bye Bye Blues, starring Rebecca Jenkins and Michael Ontkean, and it was directed by Anne Wheeler.
- In 1996, No. 1392 was filmed while pulling a short passenger train for the CanWest Global television series Jake and the Kid, and it appears in the 19th episode, "What's Real", which first aired in June 1997.
- In 2002, No. 1392 was decorated as a 19th-century locomotive to appear in the 2003 Western television film Monte Walsh, starring Tom Selleck, Isabella Rossellini, and Keith Carradine, and it was directed by Simon Wincer.

== See also ==
- Canadian National 89
- Canadian National 1009
- Canadian National 3254
- Canadian National 7470
- Canadian Pacific 972
- Union Pacific 4466
