= Northwest Science Museum =

- Established: June 14, 2014
- Location: 1835 Wildwood St., Boise, Idaho, US
- Coordinates: 43.622286°N 116.315965°W
- Type: Creationist museum
- Founders: Douglas J. Bennett, Brent Carter, Rick Deighton, Stan G. Lutz
- Director: Douglas J. Bennett
- Website: northwestsciencemuseum.com

Northwest Science Museum is a creationist museum in Idaho. It opened on June 14, 2014. The museum's directors plan to create a 350,000 square foot facility including a full-scale model of Noah's Ark near Boise, Idaho, replacing the museum's current "Vision Center" near the state capitol in Boise. The museum's founders say that their collection of Ica stones offer proof that humans and dinosaurs coexisted, that out-of-place artifacts constitute "damaging evidences [sic] against evolution", and they can show with other evidence the Earth is 6,000 years old and it was physically possible for Noah to bring dinosaurs on board the Ark.

== Inspiration ==
Fundraising documents published by the founders cite the Creation Museum in Kentucky as establishing the viability of a similar concern in Idaho.

== Collection ==
The museum's collection includes petrified wood, fossil dinosaur eggs, the Ica stones mentioned above and a replica of the "Lone Star" mastodon skull. They present the fossils as having been formed about 4,500 years ago in the Biblical Flood.

== Criticism ==
Almost three years before the museum opened, Hemant Mehta said "this place is going to be ripe for mockery...misnamed twice over — it's not science and it's hardly a museum". The Raw Story called Northwest Science Museum's Ica stones "fraudulent" and "a favorite artifact of many conspiracy theorists". London's The Independent newspaper filed the museum's opening under "weird news". A Salon.com editorial called it "beyond frustrating [n]ot just because of the pseudo-science dribbling out, but the fact that young children are being fed nonsense under the guise of 'true science'". Salon also found "much to take issue with — right down to the organization’s misleading use of the terms 'science' and 'museum.'"
