= Creation Adventures Museum =

Creationist museum in Arcadia, Florida, U.S.

Coordinates: 27.22292°N 81.87262°W

- Established: 2000
- Location: Florida, United States

Creation Adventures Museum is a creationist museum, located in Arcadia, Florida, in the United States. The museum was established by Gary Parker in 2000.
