= Canadian National 6060 =

Preserved CN class U-1-f 4-8-2 locomotive

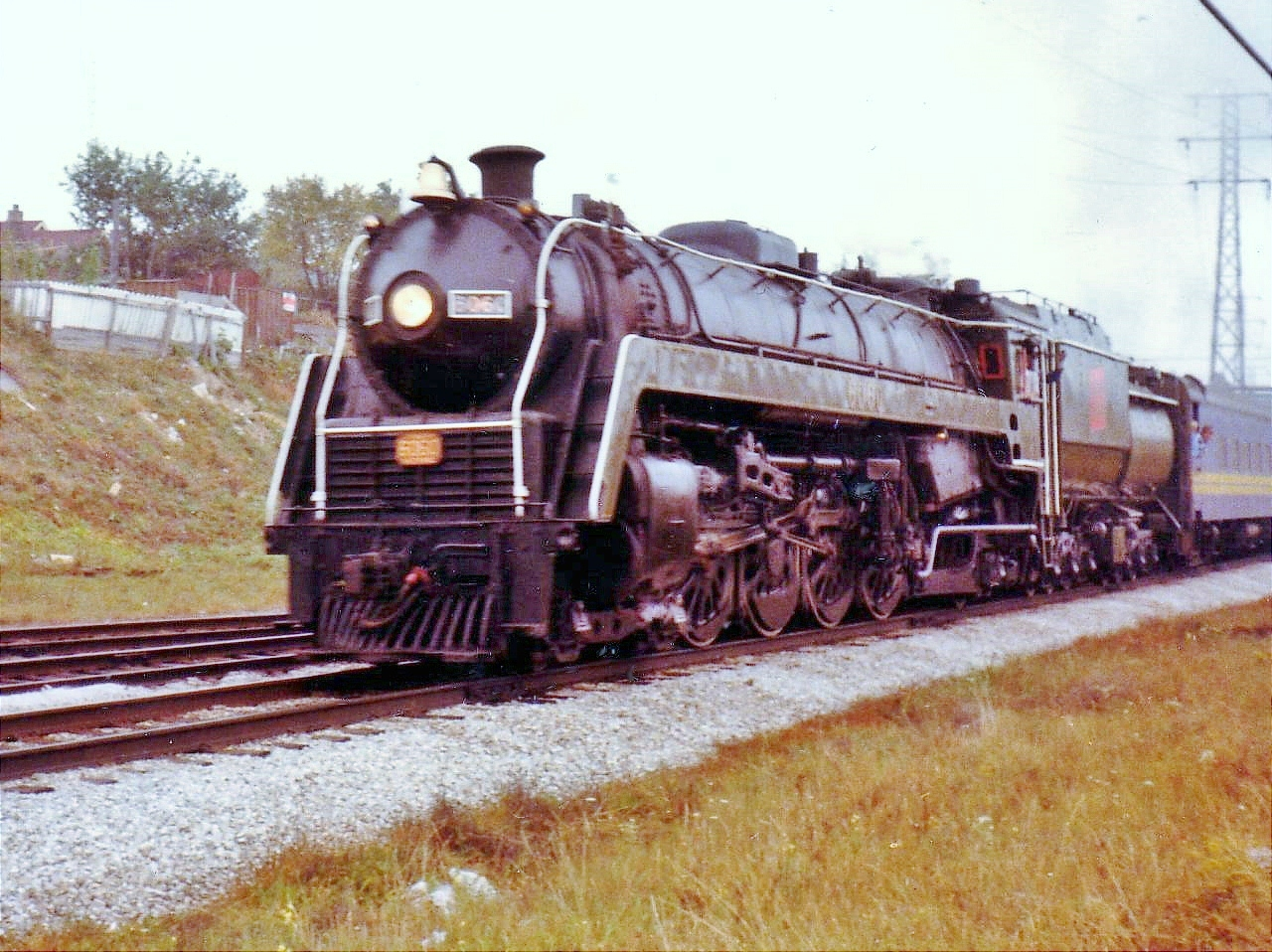
- No. 6060 leaving Toronto Union Station with an excursion train in October 1979
Type and origin
- Power type: Steam
- Builder: Montreal Locomotive Works
- Order number: Q-401
- Serial number: 72757
- Model: U-1-f
- Build date: October 1944
Specifications
- Configuration
  - Whyte: 4-8-2
  - UIC: 2′D1′ h2
- Gauge: 4 ft 8 1/2 in (1,435 mm) standard gauge
- Leading dia.: 34 in (0.86 m)
- Driver dia.: 73 in (1.85 m)
- Trailing dia.: 43 in (1.09 m)
- Wheelbase: Coupled: 19 ft 0 in (5.79 m); Loco: 42 ft 2 in (12.85 m); Loco and tender: 80 ft 10 3/4 in (24.66 m)
- Length: 90 ft 0 1/8 in (27.44 m)
- Width: 10 ft 9 in (3.28 m)
- Height: 15 ft 4 1/2 in (4.69 m)
- Adhesive weight: 236,950 lb (107.48 t; 105.78 long tons)
- Loco weight: 355,700 lb (161.3 t; 158.8 long tons)
- Tender weight: 281,840 lb (127.84 t; 125.82 long tons)
- Fuel type: New: Coal; Now: Motor oil
- Fuel capacity: Coal: 18 short tons (16 t); Oil: 5,000 imp gal (23,000 L; 6,000 US gal)
- Water cap.: 11,000 imp gal (50,000 L; 13,000 US gal)
- Tender cap.: Coal: 18 short tons (16 t) coal, 11,700 imp gal (53 m^{3}) water; Oil: 5,000 imp gal (23 m^{3}) oil, 11,000 imp gal (50 m^{3}) water
- Firebox
  - Grate area: 70.2 sq ft (6.52 m^{2})
- Boiler: 8 ft 6 in (2.59 m) diameter; 42 ft 4 in (12.90 m) length
- Boiler pressure: 260 psi (1.79 MPa)
- Heating surface
  - Firebox: 386 ft^{2} (35.9 m^{2})
  - Tubes and flues: 3,198 sq ft (297.1 m^{2})
  - Total surface: 3,584 sq ft (333.0 m^{2})
- Superheater
  - Type: Schmidt type E
  - Heating area: 1,570 sq ft (146 m^{2})
- Cylinders: Two, outside
- Cylinder size: 24 in × 30 in (610 mm × 762 mm)
- Valve gear: Walschaerts
- Valve type: Piston valves
- Train heating: Steam heat
- Loco brake: Air
- Train brakes: Air
- Couplers: Knuckle
Performance figures
- Tractive effort: 52% (52,315 lbf or 232.7 kN)
- Factor of adh.: 4.5
Career
- Operators: Canadian National Railway; Alberta Prairie Railway Excursions; Rocky Mountain Rail Society
- Class: U-1-f
- Number in class: 1st of 20
- Numbers: CN 6060
- Nicknames: Bullet-Nosed Betty; The Spirit of Alberta
- Retired: 1959 (revenue service); January 1981 (1st excursion service)
- Preserved: May 23, 1962
- Restored: July 5, 1973 (1st excursion service); May 29, 1986 (2nd excursion service)
- Current owner: Rocky Mountain Rail Society
- Disposition: Undergoing major overhaul

Canadian National 6060 is a U-1-f class 4-8-2 "Mountain" type steam locomotive, built in October 1944 by the Montreal Locomotive Works (MLW) as the first of the U-1-f class for the Canadian National Railway (CN) in Canada. It was first assigned to haul premier passenger trains and eventually fast freight trains on the CN until its retirement in 1959. Three years later, CN engineer Harry R.J. Home was able to purchase the locomotive for a cheap price and brought it to Jasper, Alberta, where No. 6060 was put on display near the Jasper station.

In 1971, CN reacquired No. 6060 and restored it to operating condition for use in excursion service until it was put into storage in 1980. Six years later, No. 6060 was rebuilt by Home and the Rocky Mountain Rail Society in time for the Expo 86 world's fair in Vancouver, British Columbia. After the event, it stayed in Vancouver, double heading with Canadian Pacific 2860 and 3716.

In 1988, No. 6060 was stored at the Alberta Railway Museum in Edmonton, until a decade later it was moved to the Alberta Prairie Railway, pulling excursions in Stettler. In 2011, it was taken out of service due to boiler issues. It remained in storage until 2020, when an overhaul began to return it to operation.

== History ==
=== Design and revenue service ===
No. 6060 was constructed in October 1944 by the Montreal Locomotive Works (MLW) in Montreal, Quebec, as the first of the Canadian National Railway's (CN) 20 class U-1-f 4-8-2 "Mountain" types. The U-1-f design was very different to the U-1-a design in mechanical and cosmetic details. Their 73 in (1,854 mm) driving wheels gave the U-1-fs balancing high-speed with no flaws. They were painted in CN's olive green livery around its running board skirt panels, cab, and tender. The U-1-fs' front smokebox had a bullet-nose cone design mounted, which earned them the nickname Bullet-Nosed Bettys. The U-1-fs were the last new design of steam locomotives built for the CN.

No. 6060 was first assigned to pull short freight trains between Montreal, Quebec, and Brockville, Ontario, for three round-trips before entering main line passenger service, pulling the Continental Limited and International Limited trains. In 1955 when diesel locomotives began taking over passenger service, No. 6060 was converted from burning coal to bunker c oil. In 1959, it was retired and sat in storage on a siding outside in Winnipeg, Manitoba, awaiting to be sent to the scrap yard. On May 23, 1962, No. 6060 was rescued for preservation by CN engineer Harry R.J. Home, who purchased the locomotive for $1 and put it on static display at the Jasper station in Alberta.

=== Excursion service ===
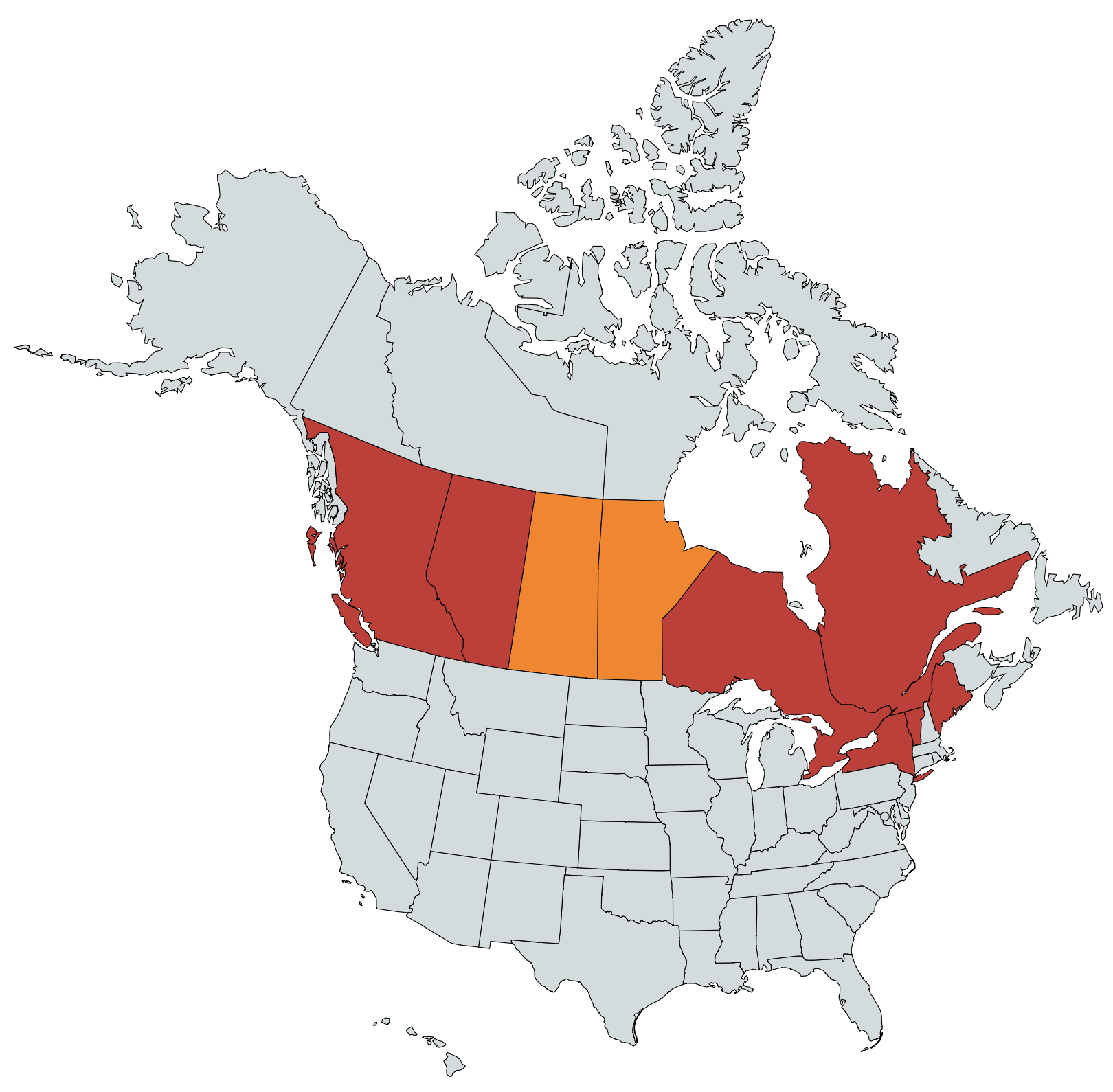
Canadian provinces and US states visited by No. 6060 in excursion service. Note: No. 6060 was towed thru Manitoba and Saskatchewan

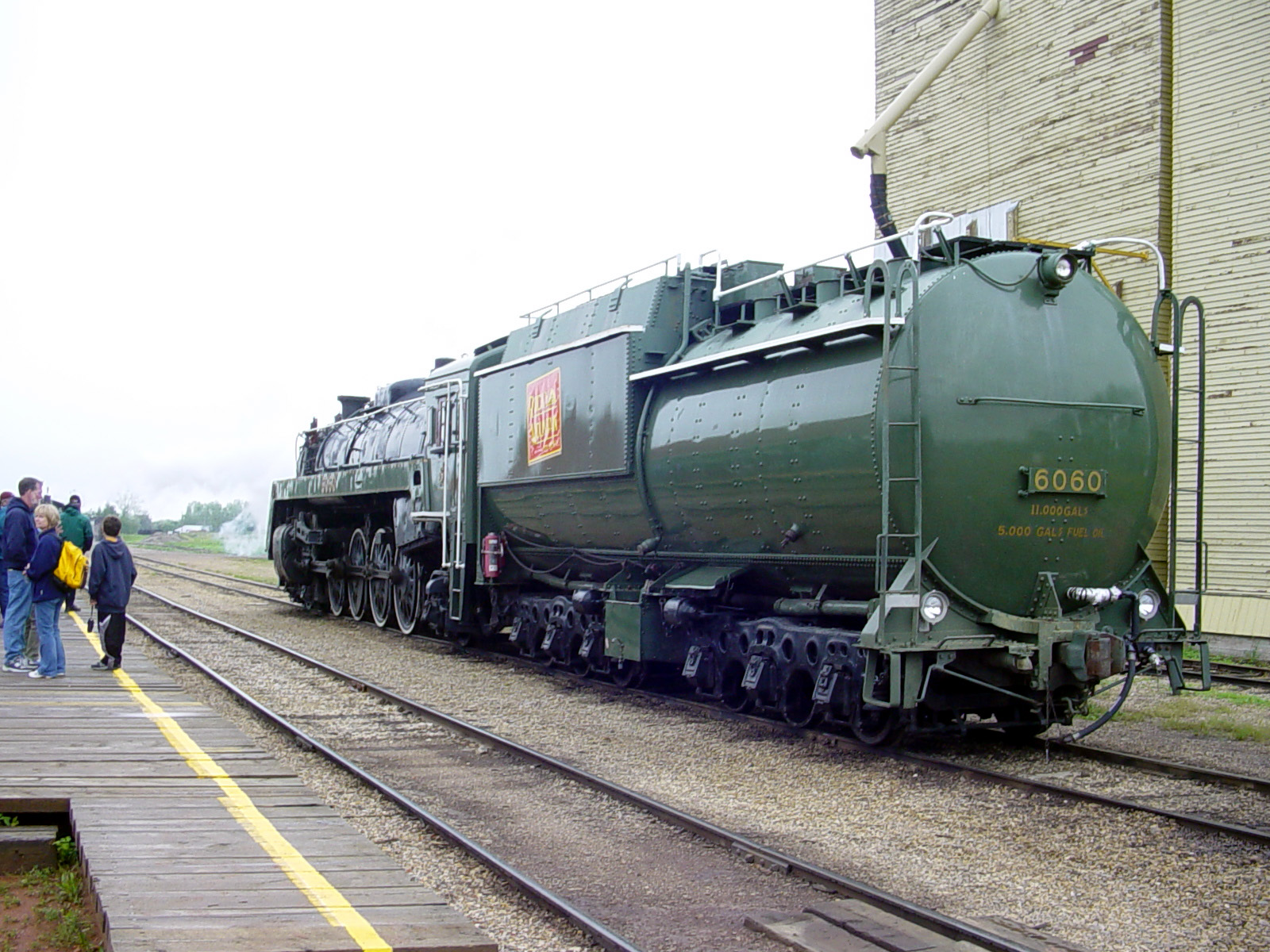
6060 operating on the Alberta Prairie Railway, on August 7, 2004

CN reacquired No. 6060 in 1971, and they began restoring it to operating condition for excursion service in 1972, as a replacement for U-2-g Confederation No. 6218. No. 6060 made its first fire-up test on June 26, 1973, and made its first movements under its own power on July 5, running to Dorval and return. On September 15, No. 6060 hauled its first special train from Montreal Central Station to Victoriaville, Richmond and return. It eventually made its debut hauling excursions for their steam excursion program on October 27. On April 29, 1978, No. 6060 hauled a special passenger train on GO Transit’s new commuter route between Toronto and Richmond Hill, as part of that route’s opening ceremony. In October 1980, No. 6060 made its final runs for CN when it ran several Labour Day weekend trains for the Alberta Pioneer Railway Association. After these trips, CN ended their excursion program.

That same year, to commemorate the Province of Alberta's 75th anniversary, No. 6060 was presented to the people of Alberta as a gift. In January 1981, it was announced that CN would retire No. 6060 from excursion service due to an extensive overhaul would be very costly to return it to service. After its boiler ticket expired in September, it was placed into storage for the next five years.

In early May 1986, No. 6060 underwent a complete restoration to return it to operating condition with the help of Harry Home, the Province of Alberta and volunteers from the Rocky Mountain Rail Society (RMRS). No. 6060 travelled under its own power to Vancouver, British Columbia, on May 29, to participate in the Steam Expo, part of the Expo 86 world's fair, alongside several other steam locomotives. After Expo 86 ended, No. 6060 and Canadian Pacific 2860 double-headed back to Alberta, though when they got there, No. 6060 developed a mechanical failure, forcing it to be taken off the excursion, while No. 2860 returned to Vancouver. In September 1988, No. 6060 was originally scheduled to run for the "Great Canadian Steam Railway Excursion", but was replaced by Canadian Pacific 3716 in the process.

In November 1991, the government of Alberta announced that it could no longer afford to maintain and operate No. 6060, due to the state of the economy of that time, and the government considered relocating the locomotive to a park for permanent display. The New York, Susquehanna and Western Railway (NYS&W) of New York State caught wind of this announcement, and they quickly offered to purchase No. 6060 for use in their steam excursion program, but negotiations were subsequently dropped. The RMRS was adamant for No. 6060 to continue operating while staying in Canada, and they quickly launched a campaign for the provincial government to reconsider the locomotive's future.

=== Ownership by the Rocky Mountain Rail Society ===
By February 1992, the Province of Alberta relinquished ownership of No. 6060 to the RMRS. No. 6060 was subsequently moved from a private siding in Calgary to the Alberta Railway Museum near Edmonton for storage and maintenance.

In 1998, the locomotive was moved to Stettler to operate regularly for Alberta Prairie Steam Tours (APST), the engine would also be converted from bunker c oil to motor oil. It continued to carry thousands of excursion passengers every summer, until it was taken out of service in the summer of 2011 due to boiler issues.

The locomotive sat in storage for eight years until 2020, when overhaul work officially began by the Rocky Mountain Rail Society to return the locomotive to operating condition, and as of 2026, work is still underway.

== See also ==
- Canadian National 6077 (Another preserved CN U-1-f class locomotive)
- Canadian National 6213
- Canadian National 3254
- Canadian Pacific 2816
- Grand Trunk Western 6039

== Bibliography ==
- Lorne, Perry (1973). Renaissance 6060. ASIN B0007B47WY.
- McQueen, Donald R. (2013). Canadian National Steam!: A Locomotive History of The People's Railway (1st ed.). Railfare DC Books. ISBN 978-1-927599-00-6.
