= Big Valley Creation Science Museum =

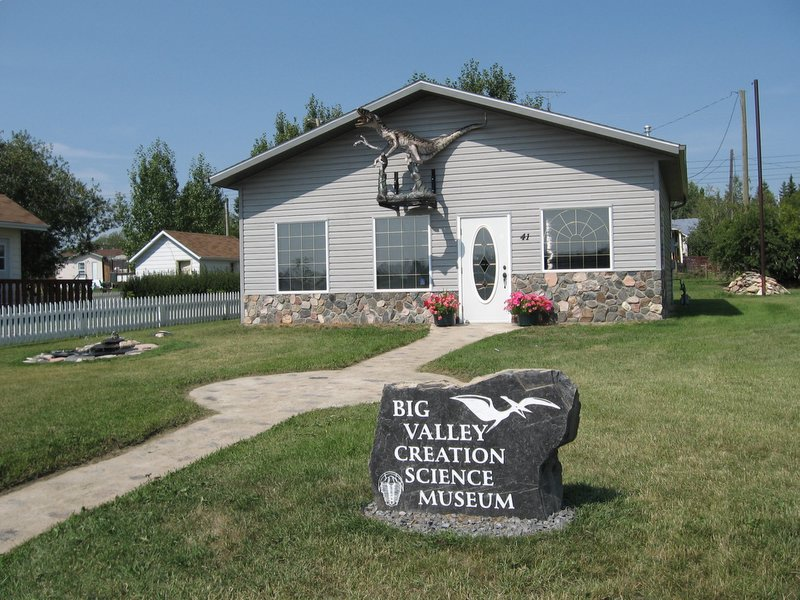
- Established: 5 June 2007; 18 years ago
- Location: 41 Railway Ave S, Big Valley, Alberta, Canada
- Coordinates: 52.035175°N 112.749939°W
- Type: Creationist museum
- Founder: Harry Nibourg
- Website: bvcsm.com

The Big Valley Creation Science Museum is a creationist museum in Big Valley, Alberta, Canada. It is dedicated to promoting creation science and young-earth creationism. The institution is the first permanent creationist museum to open in Canada.

== History ==
The museum opened to the public on June 5, 2007 by Harry Nibourg, an oil field worker. The museum measures approximately 84 square metres (900 sq ft), and cost $300,000 CAD to build. The original display proposal for the museum was drafted by Vance Nelson, the owner of Canada's largest travelling creation science museum.

Inspiration for the museum reportedly began in 1995, after Nibourg met up with Ian Juby, who is the developer of a travelling Creationist museum in Canada called the "Creation Museum of Canada."

The museum attracted 40 to 80 visitors weekly in 2007.

== Exhibits ==
Exhibits include an interactive display about the bacterium flagellum and DNA and how their complexity is supposedly evidence for a created design, scrolls tracing how the ancestry of the royal family is supposedly connected to Adam and Eve, and how fossils are supposed evidence for the Genesis flood.

== Fees and Hours ==
As of August, 2025 the museum is only open only by appointment as there is no full time staff due to limited funds. Admission is $5 CAD per adult, $3 CAD for children under 12, and $15 CAD for families.

== See also ==
- List of museums in Alberta
- Pseudoscience
- Religious cosmology
