= Hyannis, Nebraska =

Village in and county seat of Hyannis County, Nebraska, United States

- Village
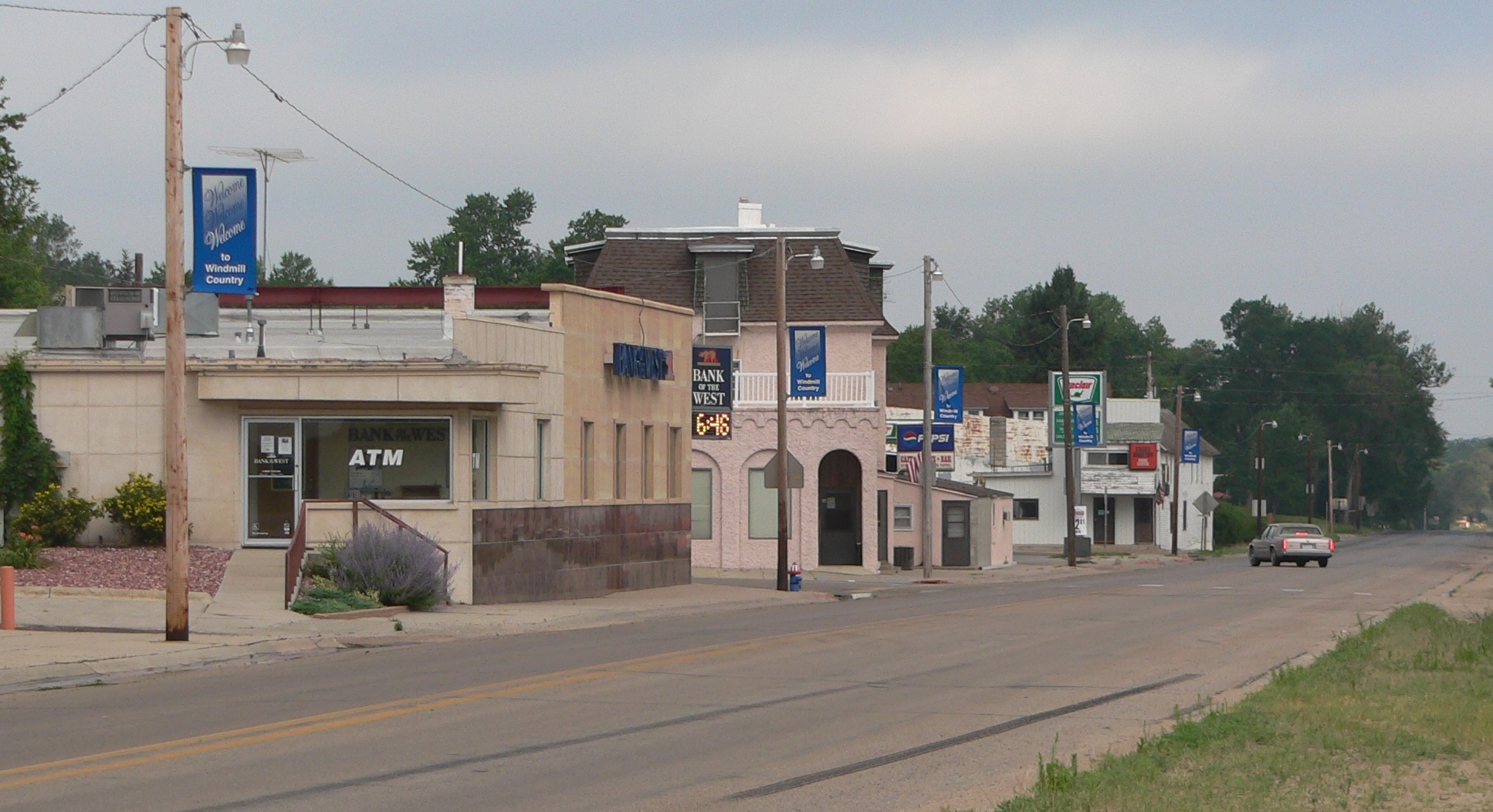
- Downtown Hyannis, looking southwest. Nebraska Highway 2/61 is in the foreground

- Location of Hyannis, Nebraska
- Coordinates: 42°00′02″N 101°45′44″W
- Country: United States
- State: Nebraska
- County: Grant

Area
  - Total: 0.52 sq mi (1.35 km^{2})
  - Land: 0.52 sq mi (1.35 km^{2})
  - Water: 0 sq mi (0.00 km^{2})
- Elevation: 3,757 ft (1,145 m)

Population (2020)
  - Total: 165
  - Density: 316.8/sq mi (122.31/km^{2})
- Time zone: UTC-7 (Mountain (MST))
  - Summer (DST): UTC-6 (MDT)
- ZIP code: 69350
- Area code: 308
- FIPS code: 31-23655
- GNIS feature ID: 2398566

Hyannis is a village in Grant County, Nebraska, United States. The population was 165 at the time of the 2020 census. It is the county seat of Grant County. It is centrally located in the Sandhills grassland region of Nebraska at the intersection of two Nebraska State Highways: NSH 61 which runs north and south, and NSH 2, which runs east and west.

== History ==
Hyannis was laid out in 1888 when the Chicago, Burlington and Quincy Railroad was extended to that point. It was named after the village of Hyannis, Massachusetts by a railroad official.

Hyannis is served by a Panhandle Trails intercity bus thrice daily Monday through Friday.

== Geography ==
Hyannis is located in the Nebraska Sandhills. According to the United States Census Bureau, the village has a total area of 0.52 square miles (1.35 km^{2}), all land.

== Demographics ==
Historical population
Census	Pop.	Note	%±
1910	262		—
1920	384		46.6%
1930	384		0.0%
1940	449		16.9%
1950	432		−3.8%
1960	373		−13.7%
1970	345		−7.5%
1980	336		−2.6%
1990	210		−37.5%
2000	287		36.7%
2010	182		−36.6%
2020	165		−9.3%
U.S. Decennial Census

=== 2010 census ===
As of the census of 2010, there were 182 people, 98 households, and 61 families residing in the village. The population density was 350.0 inhabitants per square mile (135.1/km^{2}). There were 132 housing units at an average density of 253.8 per square mile (98.0/km^{2}). The racial makeup of the village was 97.8% White and 2.2% from two or more races. Hispanic or Latino of any race were 1.6% of the population.

There were 98 households, of which 12.2% had children under the age of 18 living with them, 56.1% were married couples living together, 4.1% had a female householder with no husband present, 2.0% had a male householder with no wife present, and 37.8% were non-families. 33.7% of all households were made up of individuals, and 15.3% had someone living alone who was 65 years of age or older. The average household size was 1.86 and the average family size was 2.30.

The median age in the village was 54.2 years. 12.1% of residents were under the age of 18; 4.9% were between the ages of 18 and 24; 14.2% were from 25 to 44; 38.3% were from 45 to 64; and 30.2% were 65 years of age or older. The gender makeup of the village was 50.0% male and 50.0% female.

=== 2000 census ===
As of the census of 2000, there were 287 people, 116 households, and 88 families residing in the village. The population density was 422.8 inhabitants per square mile (163.2/km^{2}). There were 165 housing units at an average density of 243.1 per square mile (93.9/km^{2}). The racial makeup of the village was 98.61% White, 1.39% from other races. Hispanic or Latino of any race were 2.79% of the population.

There were 116 households, out of which 36.2% had children under the age of 18 living with them, 64.7% were married couples living together, 9.5% had a female householder with no husband present, and 23.3% were non-families. 23.3% of all households were made up of individuals, and 9.5% had someone living alone who was 65 years of age or older. The average household size was 2.47 and the average family size was 2.91.

In the village, the population was spread out, with 28.2% under the age of 18, 5.6% from 18 to 24, 24.7% from 25 to 44, 26.5% from 45 to 64, and 15.0% who were 65 years of age or older. The median age was 41 years. For every 100 females, there were 111.0 males. For every 100 females age 18 and over, there were 102.0 males.

As of 2000 the median income for a household in the village was $29,688, and the median income for a family was $35,313. Males had a median income of $26,000 versus $13,906 for females. The per capita income for the village was $13,906. About 4.7% of families and 6.0% of the population were below the poverty line, including 9.1% of those under the age of eighteen and none of those 65 or over.

== Notable people ==
- Al Davis, former member of the Nebraska Legislature (2013–2017)
- Chuck Hayward, motion picture stuntman
- Skeeter Thurston, retired rodeo competitor

== See also ==
- List of municipalities in Nebraska
