= GE Dash 8-40CM =

6-axle diesel locomotive

GE C40-8M
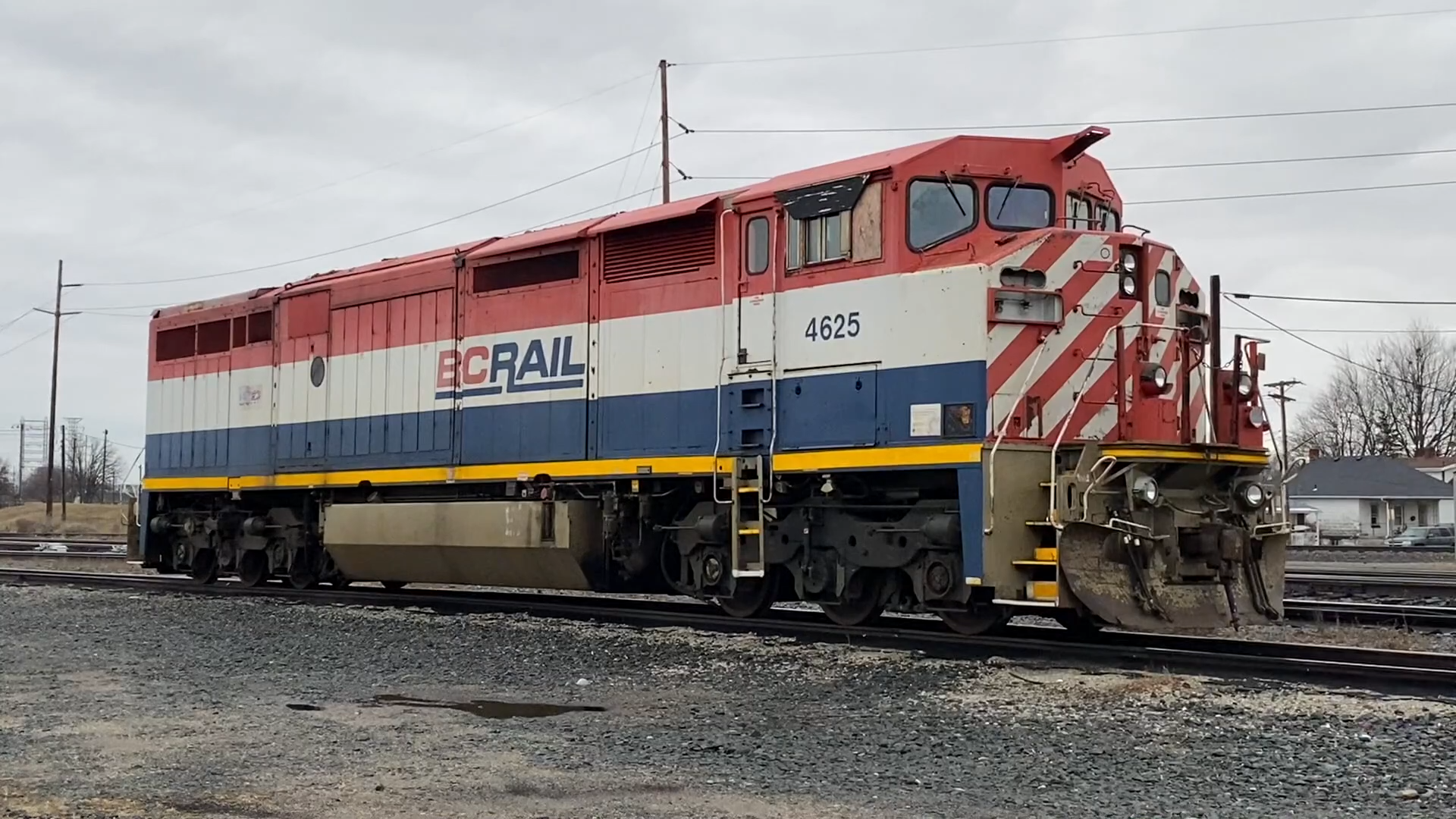
- BC Rail no. 4625, a Dash 8-40CM, sitting alone at Walbridge, Ohio on December 30, 2022.
Type and origin
- Power type: Diesel-electric
- Builder: GE Transportation Systems
- Model: C40-8M
- Build date: March 1990 – March 1994
- Total produced: 84
Specifications
- Configuration
  - AAR: C-C
  - UIC: Co'Co'
- Gauge: 4 ft 8 1/2 in (1,435 mm)
- Prime mover: GE 7FDL-16
- Engine type: V16
Career
- Operators: See table
- Locale: North America, Canada
- Preserved: BC Rail no. 4618; BC Rail no. 4609 (to be preserved)
- Disposition: All retired and to be scrapped, QNSL units scrapped, 1 preserved, 1 selected for preservation

The GE C40-8M was a 6-axle diesel locomotive built by GE Transportation Systems from 1990 to 1994. It was part of the GE Dash 8 Series of freight locomotives, and was often referred to as a Dash 8-40CM.

== Preservation ==
- BC Rail no. 4618 is preserved at the Alberta Railway Museum.

== Original owners ==
Image	Railroad	Quantity	Road numbers	Notes
	BC Rail	26	4601-4626	To CN with BCOL reporting marks. All have cab bell. 4618 preserved at Alberta Railway Museum, 4609 is training unit in Winnipeg, all other units to be scrapped.
	Canadian National Railway	55	2400-2454	First 30 ordered have high mount cab bell. None are left in service. Unit 2412 used for derailment response training at Homewood Training Campus.
	Quebec North Shore and Labrador Railway	3	401-403	Sold to AEX. AEX renumbered them to 100017–100019.
	Totals	84		

== See also ==
- List of GE locomotives
