= Lost World Museum =

- Location within New York
- Location: Phoenix, New York
- Coordinates: 43.228817°N 76.300210°W
- Type: Creationist museum
- Founder: John Adolfi
- Website: Official website

The Lost World Museum is a creationist museum, located in Phoenix, New York, in the United States. The museum was established by John Adolfi.
