= Skeeter Thurston =

American-Canadian rodeo cowboy

Skeeter Thurston is an American-Canadian former professional rodeo cowboy who specialized in saddle bronc riding.

== Rodeo career ==
Thurston was a six-time qualifier for the National Finals Rodeo. He was also a five-time qualifier for the Canadian Finals Rodeo.

== Personal life ==
Thurston is originally from Hyannis, Nebraska, United States, and currently resides in Big Valley, Alberta, Canada. He is the father of world champion saddle bronc rider Zeke Thurston.
