= Zeke Thurston =

Canadian bronc rider (born 1994)

Personal information
- Full name: Zeke Thurston
- Born: July 15, 1994 (age 32) Big Valley, Alberta, Canada
- Height: 5 ft 9 in (1.75 m) (2017)
- Weight: 145 lb (66 kg) (2017)

Sport
- Sport: Rodeo
- Event: Saddle bronc riding
- Turned pro: 2015

Achievements and titles
- Highest world ranking: 4x PRCA Saddle Bronc Riding World Champion

Zeke Thurston (born July 15, 1994) is a Canadian professional rodeo cowboy who specializes in saddle bronc riding. He is a four-time (2016, 2019, 2022, and 2023) Professional Rodeo Cowboys Association (PRCA) World Champion saddle bronc rider, as well as a six-time (2019, 2021–2025) Canadian Professional Rodeo Association (CPRA) champion saddle bronc rider.

== Early life ==
Zeke Thurston was born on July 15, 1994, in Big Valley, Alberta, Canada. He attended and graduated from Sheridan College. His father, Skeeter Thurston, was a six-time National Finals Rodeo (NFR) and five-time Canadian Finals Rodeo (CFR) qualifier.

== Professional career ==
Thurston competes in the PRCA circuit. In 2016, he won the saddle bronc riding world championship at the National Finals Rodeo. He beat Jacobs Crawley by less than $3,000. He solidified his crown by winning the Average at the 2016 NFR as well as his first NFR go around.

In 2019, Thurston won the saddle bronc riding world championship for a second time. On his way there, he broke the yearly earnings record for the event. Thurston also earned $347,056 which was more than Ryder Wright's earnings of $284,938 in 2017. Thurston said he wanted this second championship even more than the first one. Thurston also became the first competitor since 2011 to win both a PRCA world championship and a Canadian Professional Rodeo Association national championship the same year.

Thurston got his first NFR round win, in Round 6, of the 2016 NFR by making an 88.5 point ride on the bucking horse Black Hills from C5 Rodeo.

He also won Rounds 6 and 9 of the 2018 NFR. He also won Rounds 1, 7 and 9 of the 2019 NFR to capture his second world championship. His Round 7 victory fell just half a point shy of the 93 point arena record set by Billy Etbauer. Thurston was riding Northcott Macza's Get Smart when he made his 92.5 point ride.

Thurston came just one point shy of the all-time world record saddle bronc ride with a 94-point ride. He rode aboard one of the Calgary Stampede's broncs, Special Delivery, at the 2019 Hardgrass Bronc Match in Pollockville, Alberta. He is also a four-time champion of the Calgary Stampede.

At the 2022 NFR, Thurston won the saddle bronc riding average for the second time in his career, which included winning Round 4. He would also win the Top Gun Award for the first time in his career by winning the most money in one event by any NFR contestant. He also won his third PRCA saddle bronc riding world championship.

== Personal life ==
Thurston resides in Big Valley, Alberta, with his wife Jayne and their three children. His interests include ranching, roping, deer hunting, and fishing. He continues to play amateur hockey since childhood.
