= Jacobs Crawley =

American rodeo cowboy (born 1988)

Jacobs Crawley (born May 27, 1988) is an American professional rodeo cowboy who specializes in saddle bronc riding. He won the Professional Rodeo Cowboys Association (PRCA) saddle bronc riding world championship in 2015.

== Semi-professional career ==
Crawley won the year-end saddle bronc riding championship for the semi-professional Cowboys Professional Rodeo Association (CPRA) in 2008 and 2009.

== College career ==
In 2011, Crawley won the National Intercollegiate Rodeo Association (NIRA) saddle bronc riding title at the College National Finals Rodeo (CNFR) in Casper, Wyoming, while he studied at Texas A&M University, where he graduated with an engineering degree.

== Professional career ==
Crawley won the PRCA Texas Circuit saddle bronc riding championship eleven times (2012-2014, 2016-2023).

In 2015, he won the PRCA saddle bronc riding world championship at the National Finals Rodeo (NFR) in Las Vegas, Nevada. In 2016, he finished runner-up by less than $3,000 to Zeke Thurston. His younger brother, Sterling Crawley, is also a PRCA saddle bronc rider, and the two often compete together at the same rodeos.

Jacobs qualified ten consecutive years for the NFR from 2011 through 2020, while Sterling qualified for the NFR seven times in 2012 and 2013 and again from 2016 through 2020. Sterling won the Texas Circuit saddle bronc riding championship in 2024.

== Personal life ==
Jacobs Crawley was born on May 27, 1988, in Ennis, Texas. He spent most of his life in Stephenville, Texas, but now lives in Boerne, Texas.
