= 7 Wonders Museum =

Creationist museum in Washington

Coordinates: 46.321°N 122.754°W

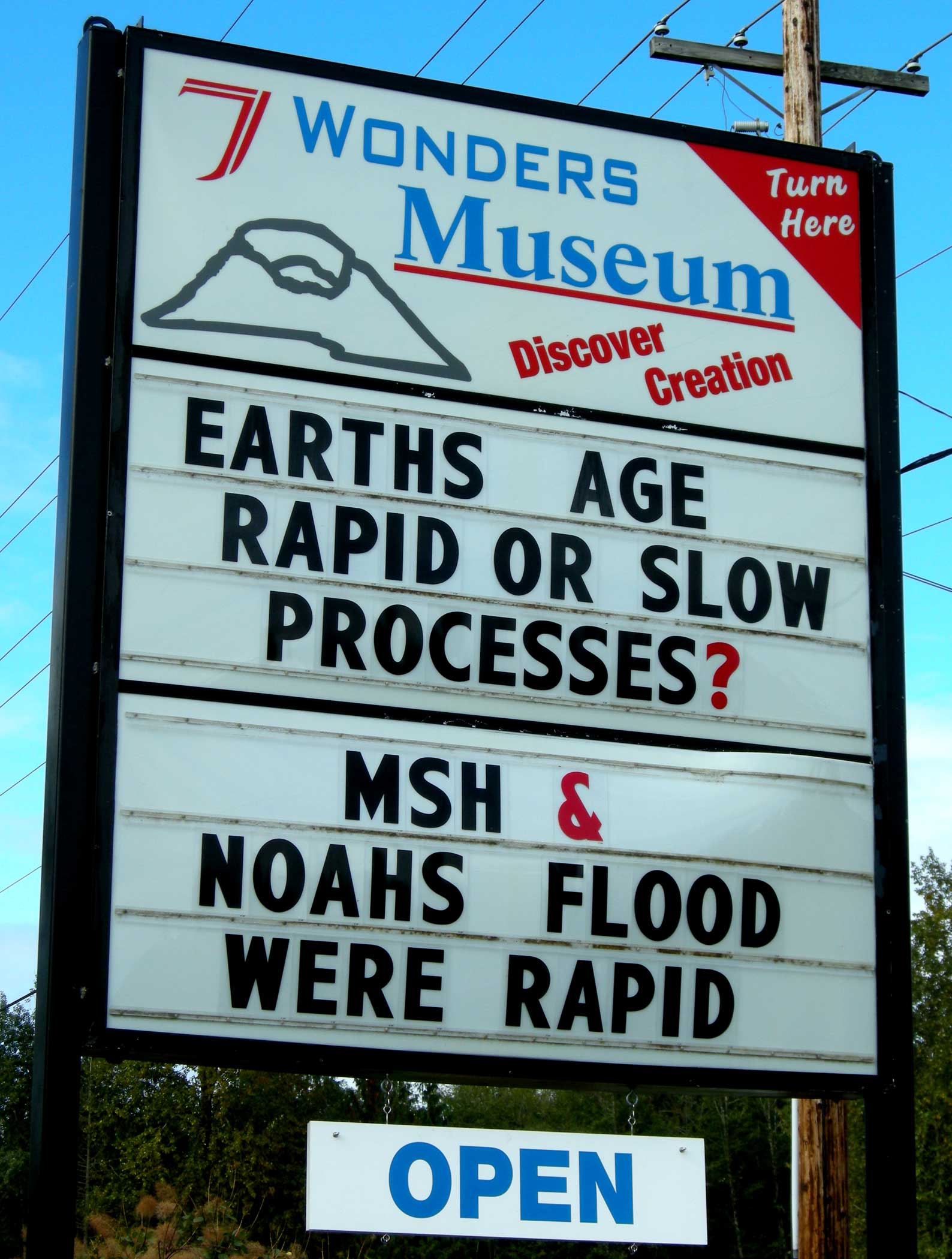
Signpost at the museum

The Mount St. Helens Creation Information Center, previously Seven Wonders Creation Museum and Seven Wonders Museum of Mount St. Helens, is a ministry, museum, and bookstore dedicated to promoting young Earth creationism. The museum is located off of I-5 at Castle Rock, Washington on Front Street near Mount St. Helens, United States. Admission is free but donations are accepted, and often accompanied by a guided tour of volcano sights.

== History ==
The two-room museum was founded in 1998 by Lloyd and Doris Anderson, who lived in a nearby house. Lloyd Anderson, born circa 1934, has a master's degree in theology from Dallas Theological Seminary, and is a retired former pastor; his wife Doris has worked as a registered nurse and journalist. The 7 Wonders Museum takes its name from seven Mount St. Helens land features that changed in no more than a few years. Lloyd claims that it offers creation evidence to support the Bible as "without error in the original writing." The Andersons see the eruption as divine evidence for young Earth creationism, and see their museum as a counterpoint to the many shops and visitors centers near Mount St. Helens conveying the secular view.

Since October 2014, when the Andersons retired, the museum was directed by Paul and Geraldine Taylor, and renamed the Mount St. Helens Creation Center. In 2017, it moved from Silver Lake, Washington to Castle Rock.

== Criticism ==
The scientific community considers creationism pseudoscience. "By one count there are some 700 scientists (out of a total of 480,000 U.S. Earth and life scientists) who give credence to creation-science, the general theory that complex life forms did not evolve but appeared 'abruptly'". Scientists say the museum rejects modern science because of the museum's preconceived religious views, and misleads visitors by extrapolating very special geologic events into equivalence with much longer-term events.

Wilfred Elders, an emeritus professor of geology at the University of California-Riverside and a former chairman of the Education Committee of the Geothermal Resources Council of the US stated, "The Seven Wonders Creation Museum is an example of the 'best' and the 'worst' of the young-Earth creationist movement. It is good in that it actually reports geological observations. It is bad because it ignores the scientific method in interpreting them. ... Constrained by a view of biblical chronology, young-Earth creationists infer that the seven days of creation occurred less than 10,000 years ago, and that the next significant event in the history of the Earth and of life was the flood of Noah. The 7 Wonders museum ignores or rejects anything that disagrees with that view. In doing so it rejects modern science."
