= The Earth Museum =

2018 Turkish sci-fi anthology

- Cover of the first edition (Turkish)
- Author: edited by Burak Albayrak
- Original title: Yeryüzü Müzesi
- Cover artist: Hamdi Akçay
- Language: Turkish
- Genre: Science fiction
- Publisher: Ithaki Yayinlari
- Publication date: 2018
- Publication place: Turkey
- Media type: Print (hardcover and paperback)
- Pages: 312
- ISBN: 9786053757573

The Earth Museum (Turkish: Yeryüzü Müzesi) is an anthology of 18 science-fiction stories by 18 Turkish sci-fi writers published in January 2018 by İthaki Publishing Company.

To mark the 18th anniversary of its foundation, Bilimkurgu Kulübü (The Science-Fiction Club) has compiled a collection of science fiction stories to be published in 2018 under the title The Earth Museum, an anthology featuring 18 Turkish science-fiction writers who contributed to the book with 18 short stories. The work has also been endorsed with a message by the legendary sci-fi and fantasy author Ursula K. Le Guin. This message, of which the Turkish translation adorns the back cover of the book, also has historical value as her last words published before the author's death on 22 January 2018.

"I was very happy to learn that Bilimkurgu Kulübü plans an anthology of science fiction stories by Turkish writers. In these troubled times, all artists are strengthened by knowing of other artists working to assert and uphold the creative principle, and of non-profit publishers who support them by freeing their work from the constraints of the market-place. All of us, all over the world, seem to be struggling through a great darkness. Such works are like lamps lighted where we need them most, illuminating what is around them and the way we need to go. The fuel of those lamps is the imagination. Thank you, my Turkish readers and friends and fellow-writers, for keeping the light burning." (Ursula K. Le Guin, January, 2018)

== Contents ==
The Earth Museum features Burak Albayrak as the editor, Tuðçe Nida Sevin as the coordinator and includes a preface by Bulent Akkoc. The collection comprises the following short stories:

Author	Story Title
İsmail Yamanol	First Contact
Selim Erdoğan	The Big Fairy
Ruhşen Doğan Nar	World Shaming Day
Orkun Uçar	The Birth of the Gods
Selin Arapkirli	A Sobeski Experiment
Çağrı Mert Bakırcı	Angyra: A Futuristic Utopia
Murat Doğan	The Hump
Kadri Kerem Karanfil	The World's Secret Owners
Feraye Şahin	Q.I.A.P.
Gokcan Şahin	A-T-G-C
İsmail Yiğit	Robomorphose
Sinan İpek	The Invention of the Millennium: Cingoz
Mikail Boz	The Last Journey
Murat Başekim	Selfie
Aşkın Güngör	The Soul
Tevfik Uyar	Feces
Funda Özlem Seran	The Matryoshka Doll
Müfit Özdeş	Smart Door

== See also ==
- Ursula K. Le Guin
