= Alberta Railway Museum =

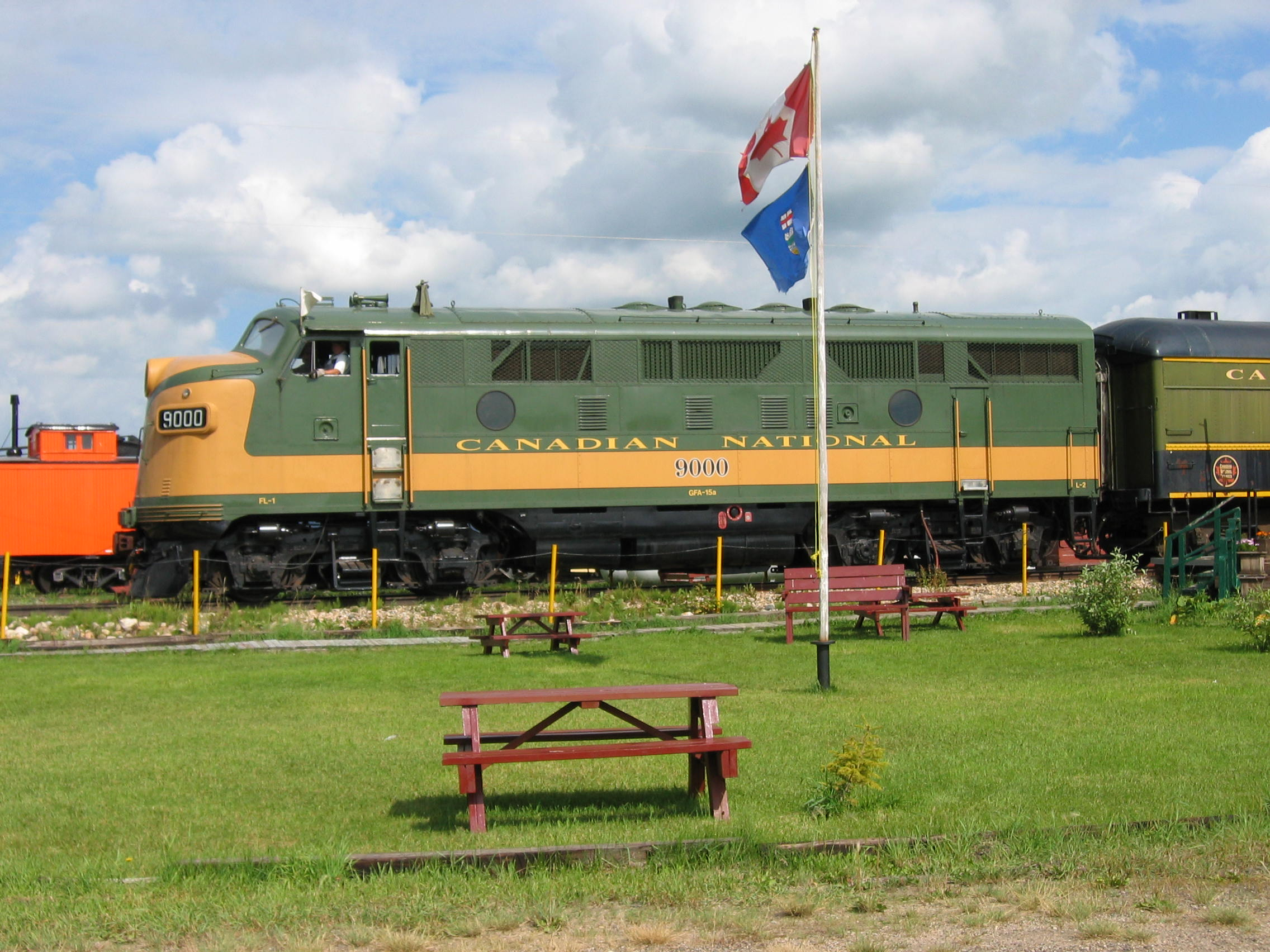

- Location in Edmonton
- Established: 1968
- Location: 24215 34 Street NW, Edmonton, Alberta, Canada
- Coordinates: 53.7022°N 113.3828°W
- Type: Transportation Museum
- Website: www.albertarailwaymuseum.com

The Alberta Railway Museum (reporting mark ARM) is a railway museum in the north end of Edmonton, Alberta, Canada. It houses a collection of railway equipment and buildings and has locomotives from both the Canadian National Railways (CNR) and Northern Alberta Railways (NAR).

== History ==
The Alberta Railway Museum began by a group of volunteers in 1968; they later relocated in 1975 to their current location, on the former Canadian Northern Railway Coronado Subdivision.

The museum opens from 10 am to 5 pm during the seasons of Victoria Day weekend in May and through Labour Day weekend in September. The museum also offers speeder cars run a during the summer season and also run passenger trains with their locomotives during select weekends, from May, July, August through September. The museum also serves guided and self-guided tours of the property, which lasts approximately 90 minutes. Through the year, volunteers keep the museum operating, with the exception of summer staff. Funding comes from memberships, museum admissions, grants and casinos.

In 2018, the museum celebrated its 50th anniversary. In 2020, the museum was closed for a year due to the COVID-19 pandemic in Alberta, but later reopened.

== Collection ==
=== Locomotives ===
Locomotive details
Number / Name	Image	Type	Model	Built	Builder	Status
1392		Steam	4-6-0	1913	Montreal Locomotive Works	Stored, awaiting repairs
73		Steam	2-8-0	1927	Canadian Locomotive Company	Display
9000		Diesel	F3A	1948	Electro-Motive Diesel	Operational
302		Diesel	GMD1	1959	General Motors	Operational
6515/6614		Diesels	F7's	1957	General Motors	Operational
7944		Diesel	NW2	1946	General Motors	Operational
4		Diesel	44-ton switcher	1946	GE Transportation Systems	Operational
5000		Diesel	GP30	1963	General Motors	Stored, declared surplus
LaFarge		Diesel	44-ton switcher	1956	GE Transportation Systems	Operational
4618		Diesel	C40-8M	1990	General Electric	Operational

=== Rolling stock ===
Rolling stock details
Number / Name	Image	Type	Built	Builder
10648		Express Refrigerator	1957	Marine Industries
11141		Through Baggage car	1942	Canadian Car and Foundry
7815		Mail Express car	1937	Canadian Car and Foundry
8730		Baggage car	1939	Canadian Car and Foundry
17106		Combine Passenger car	1900	Unknown
1454		Mail Express car	1930	Canadian Car and Foundry
1460		Mail Express car	1948	Canadian Car and Foundry
1220		Sleeper car	1943	Pullman Car Company
15029		Rule Instruction car	1916	National Steel Car
Rycroft		Sleeper car	1913	Pullman Car Company
Westlock		Sleeper car	1917	Pullman Car Company
Dunvegan		Bedroom Sleeper car	1907	Barney and Smith Car Company
Regina		Sleeper car	1923	Canadian Car and Foundry
Pelee Island		Sleeper car	1927	Canadian Car and Foundry
Fort Brabant		Sleeper car	1924	Canadian Car and Foundry
46230		Refrigerator car	Unknown	Unknown
172855		Stock car	1912	Pullman Standard
477871		Boxcar	1939	Canadian Car and Foundry
509893		Boxcar	1930	National Steel Car
512719		Boxcar	1931	Canadian Car and Foundry
17913		Boxcar	UnKnown	Unknown
6570		Tank car	Unknown	Unknown
16040		Tank car	1920	Unknown
7379		Combine car	Unknown	Unknown
16511		Flat car	Unknown	Unknown
15015		Flat car	1910	Unknown
14040		Ballast car	1919	Hart-Otis
14085		Ballast car	Unknown	Unknown
16601		Flanger	1914	Unknown
16522		Jordan Spreader	1929	Unknown
68301		Outfit car	1911	Unknown
409748		Outfit car	Unknown	Unknown
51625		Tanker car	Unknown	Unknown
69695		Bunk car	Unknown	Unknown
17050		Bunk car	Unknown	Unknown
17900		Engineering car	1914	Unknown
17009		Foreman and Tool car	1940	Unknown
17032		Cook Supply car	1911	Canadian Pacific Railway
17062		Cook car	1917	Canadian Pacific Railway
50800		Load test car	Unknown	Unknown
17092		Boxcar	1911	Canadian Pacific Railway
55245		Snowplow	1952	Russell Car and Snowplow Company
78185		Caboose	1929	CNR Transcona Car Shops
306		Caboose	Unknown	Unknown
13025		Caboose	1953	Canadian Car and Foundry
50127		Crane	1914	Industrial Works
63017		Crane	Unknown	Unknown
57611		Idler	1912	Unknown
50387 / 54597		Crane / Idler	1956	Industrial-Brownhoist
51566		Tender	1910	Unknown
28251		Flatcar	1909	Dominion Car and Foundry
58285		Gondola car	1930	National Steel Car
18104		Bunk car	Unknown	Unknown

== See also ==
- List of heritage railways in Canada
- List of museums in Canada
