= Mt. Blanco Fossil Museum =

Creationist museum in Crosbyton, Texas

Coordinates: 33.660364°N 101.238935°W

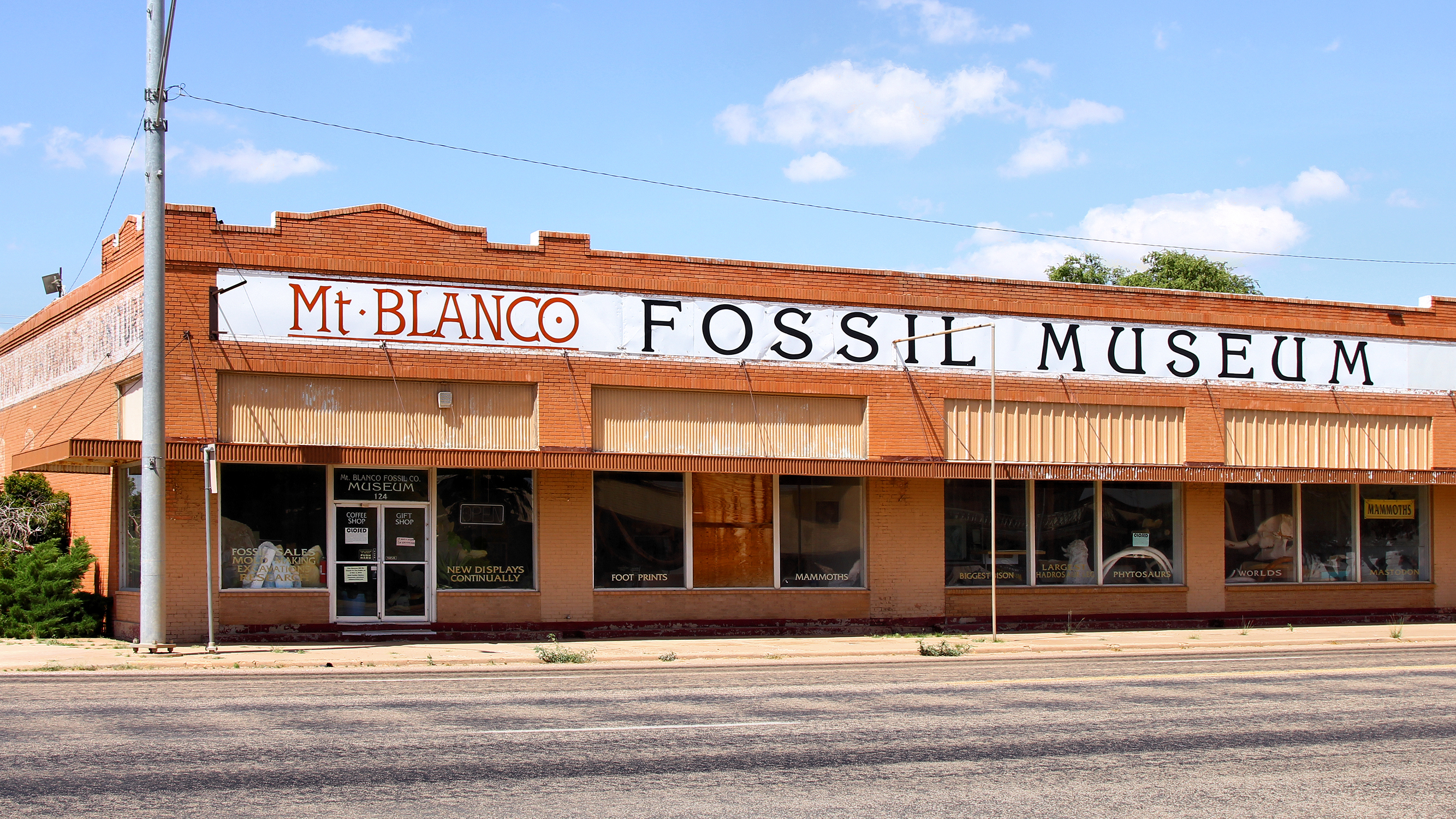

The Mt. Blanco Fossil Museum was a creationist museum in Crosbyton, Texas, United States, opened in 1998. Its motto was "Digging up the facts of God's Creation: One fossil at a time."

The warehouse-sized museum contained a mixture of fossilized skeletons and cast replicas. The replicas included a juvenile Triceratops, a full-sized mastodon skeleton, the largest hadrosaur leg ever found, and the world's largest ice age bison skull. Real bones displayed included the head of a metoposaur, and once included the world's largest four-tusked mastodon skull.

The museum also based the Mount Blanco fossil excavation team who went on digs and investigate fossil evidence according to a creationist view. The museum has collaborated with Carl Baugh of the Creation Evidence Museum in Glen Rose, Texas, in casting alleged mixed human and dinosaur footprints. Those prints have been strongly criticized as incorrectly identified dinosaur prints, other fossils, or outright forgeries.

The museum announced its permanent closure in 2023 following founder Joe Taylor's death.

== Joe Taylor ==
The museum's owner, director, and curator was Joe Taylor, an artist-turned-expert in making castings of ancient bones. He was born to a farm family in Crosbyton, and was raised in the Primitive Baptist church. He worked as a commercial artist in Hollywood, California, on billboards on the Sunset Strip, magazine illustrations, the lettering on the original Mr. Pibb soda cans, and many album covers, which still fill a room in the museum. In 1986, he painted a 40-foot long and 10-foot high mural of the history of Crosby County for the nearby Crosby County Pioneer Memorial Museum. In 1994, Calvin Smith contacted Joe Taylor of Mt. Blanco Casting Company from Crosbyton, Texas to cast the bull and juvenile in situ so their relative positions could be recorded. After receiving another grant for $14,300 from the Cooper Foundation, the largest field latex mold of an in situ specimen made to date was achieved between April 1 and June 3 that same year. This 10-foot-by-40-foot casting of a bull and juvenile mammoth made at the Waco Mammoth Site, now Waco Mammoth National Monument, which is on exhibit at the Mayborn Museum Complex. Taylor died on March 5, 2023.

== "Lone Star" mastodon skull ==
The largest mastodon skull on record was found in February 2004 in a gravel pit near La Grange, Texas. It was in pieces, and acquiring and assembling the skull took the museum a year and a half, and cost $141,000. The skull weighed 700 pounds, and was almost the size of a Volkswagen. It was named "Lone Star", and became the centerpiece of the museum.

However, in 2001 and 2002, Taylor and the Mount Blanco fossil excavation team had cooperated with another team in excavating the skeleton of an Allosaurus outside Dinosaur, Colorado. The exact nature of each team's contributions became contentious, and the groups argued publicly until an agreement in April 2004, which awarded Taylor $124,843 out of $200,000 for his share of the Allosaurus, and committed all parties to refrain from disparaging the others. Over the next three years, Taylor continued to disparage the other side on the Internet, resulting in a fine of $136,000 in damages.

On January 20, 2008, as the sheriff's department was preparing to force the sale of the museum to pay the fine, the Mt. Blanco Fossil Museum auctioned off the prize exhibit of its collection. The world's largest mastodon skull was auctioned with Heritage Auctions of Dallas, and sold for $191,200, of which Taylor received $128,000, enabling the museum to stay open.

Taylor never received the $127,000 owed to him from the sale of the Lone Star mastodon. Heritage Auction House turned the money over to Pete DeRosa Sr. to settle the suit won by DeRosa against Taylor. This caused Taylor to close his museum for two years, opening sporadically until the last two museum workers were forced to leave. He re-opened in 2010.
