= GMD GMD1 =

Model of Canadian light roadswitcher

General Motors Diesel GMD1
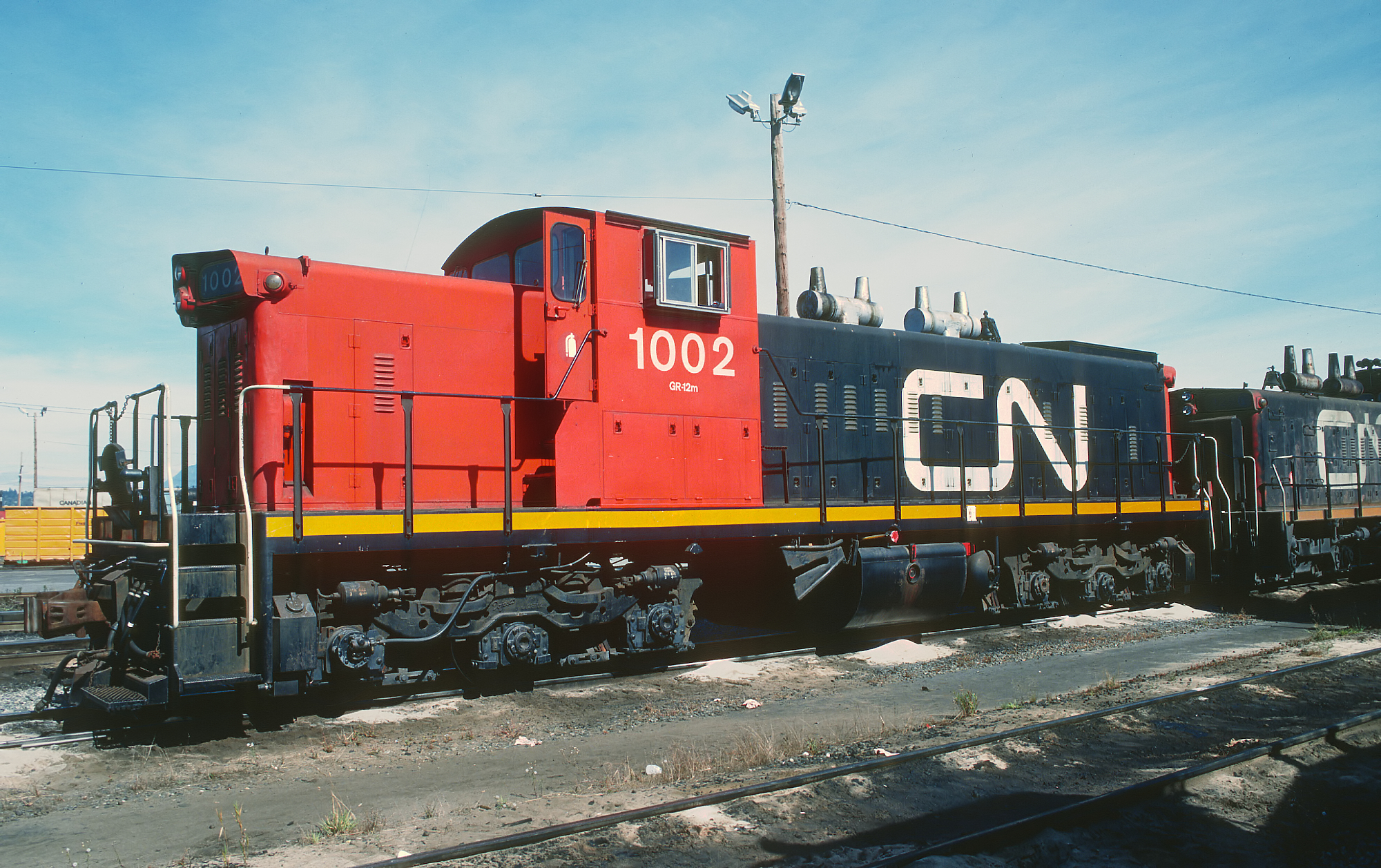
- Canadian National 1002 in Port Mann in September 1987
Type and origin
- Power type: Diesel-electric
- Builder: General Motors Diesel
- Build date: August 1958 – April 1960
- Total produced: 101
Specifications
- Configuration
  - AAR: A1A-A1A (83); B-B (18)
  - UIC: (A1A)(A1A); Bo′Bo′
- Prime mover: EMD 12-567C
- Engine type: V12 diesel
- Aspiration: Roots-type blower
- Cylinders: 12
Performance figures
- Power output: 1,200 hp (890 kW)
Career
- Disposition: 3 preserved, most still in service

The GMD GMD1 is a diesel locomotive originally produced by General Motors Diesel (GMD), the Canadian subsidiary of General Motors Electro-Motive Division, between August 1958 and April 1960. This road switcher locomotive is powered by a 12-cylinder EMD 567C diesel engine, capable of producing 1,200 horsepower (890 kW). The GMD1 was built on either Flexicoil A1A-A1A (for light-rail prairie branchlines) or Flexicoil B-B trucks. One hundred and one were built: Canadian National (CN) purchased 96 and Northern Alberta Railways (NAR) the remaining five, which later became part of CN's fleet when it acquired majority interest in NAR.

As the light branches were abandoned or rehabilitated, the bulk were upgraded with new fuel tanks and Flexicoil B-B trucks and assigned to yard and transfer service. In 1988 and 1989, 39 GMD1s were remanufactured by CN as GMD 1Us: 12 emerged with B-B trucks and continued to run long-hood forward, while the others retained their A1A trucks and were converted to short-hood-forward operation. On April 19, 2021, CN's last GMD-1 was retired from revenue service.

== Original owners ==
Image	Road	Quantity	Road numbers	Notes
	Canadian National	78	1000–1077	A1A-A1A trucks
	Canadian National	18	1900–1917	B-B trucks; fitted with steam generators
	Northern Alberta Railways	5	300–305	A1A-A1A trucks (to CN 1078–1082)
	Total	101		

== Second-hand users ==
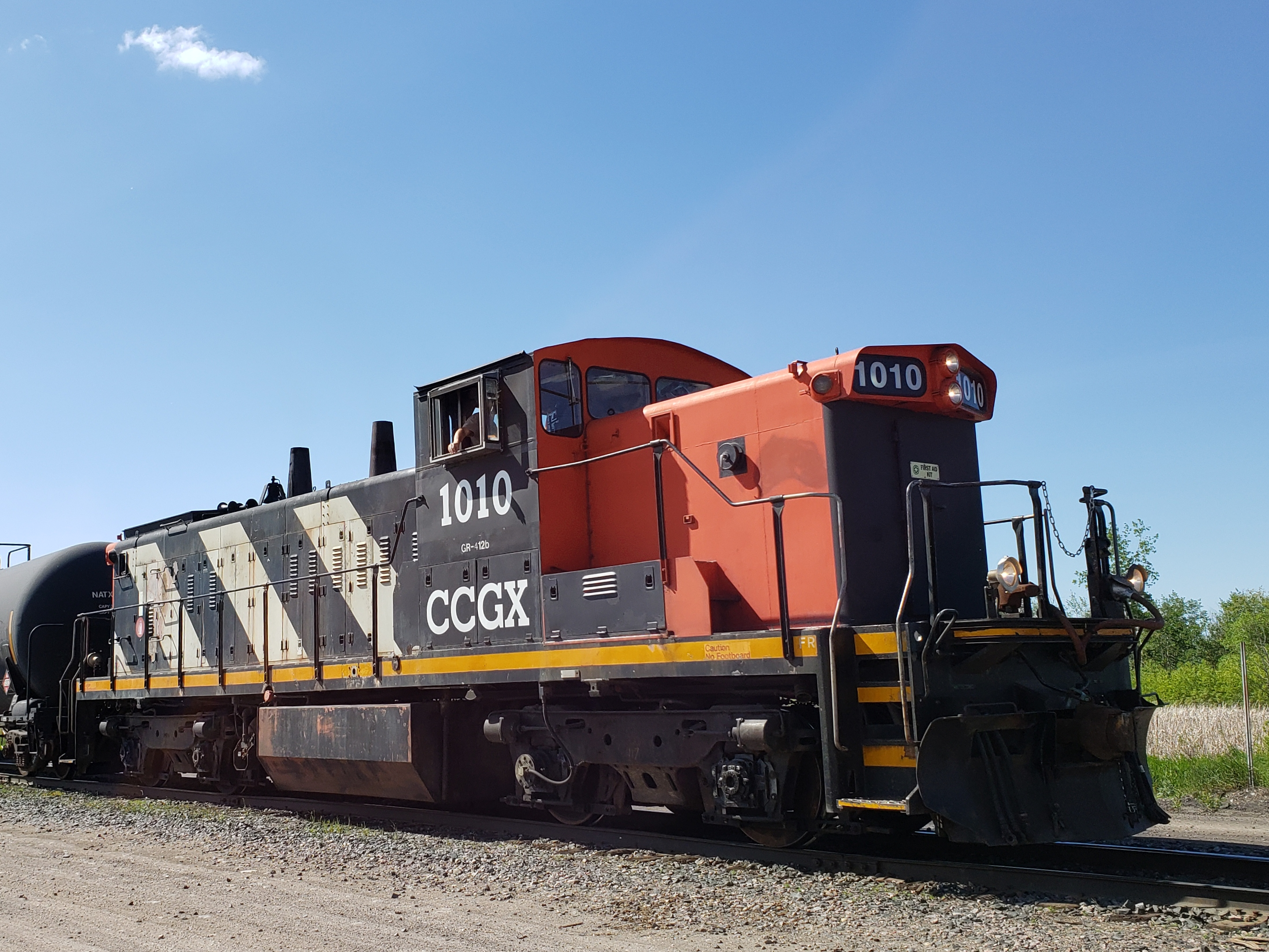
Cando Rail Services 1010 operating at the North Transcona Yard in Winnipeg

A number of GMD1 units were sold off in the 1990s and 2000s to rebuilders, leasers, regional and shortline railways. Twenty were acquired by Ferrocarriles de Cuba. Oregon Pacific Railroad acquired CN No. 1413, and is now numbered OPR No. 1413. Cando Rail Services acquired CN 1401, 1434 and 1435 in late 2018. CN 1401 is now CCGX 1009, CN 1435 is CCGX 1010. Waterloo Central Railway took donation of and restored a GMD1 in 2021.

== See also ==
- List of GMD Locomotives
