= Museum of Earth History =

- Location: Dallas, Texas
- Coordinates: 32.70072°N 96.83041°W
- Director: G. Thomas Sharp
- Website: www.moeh.org

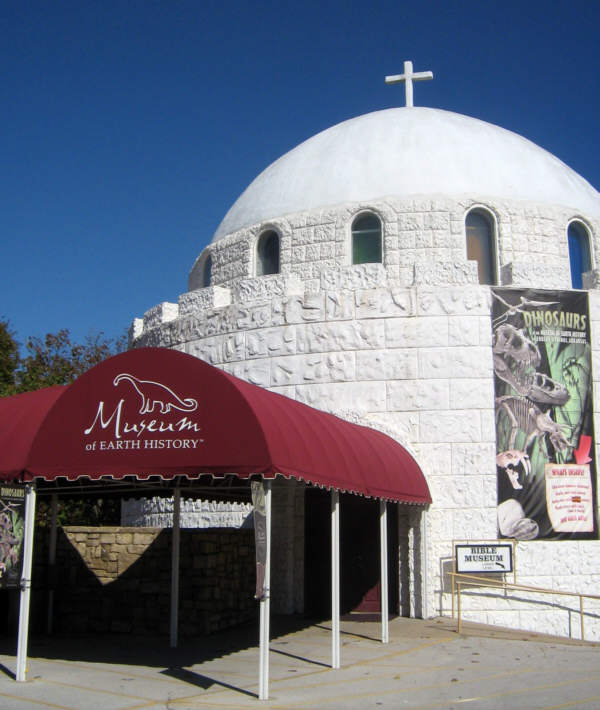
Museum of Earth History (former location)

The Museum of Earth History is a controversial young Earth creationist museum based on fundamentalist Christian theology. It features replicas of dinosaur skeletons in exhibits and the Book of Genesis biblical scripture.

Exhibits explain that extinction of dinosaurs was caused by the Great Flood rather than a meteorite and that Noah carried dinosaurs aboard his ark. A Tyrannosaurus alongside Adam and Eve are described as living in peace with each other, therefore Tyrannosaurus was a herbivore rather than a carnivore.

Originally located in Eureka Springs, Arkansas on the grounds of The Great Passion Play, but later moved to the campus of Christ for the Nations Institute in Dallas, Texas.
