= Big Valley, Alberta =

Big Valley
- Village
- Village of Big Valley
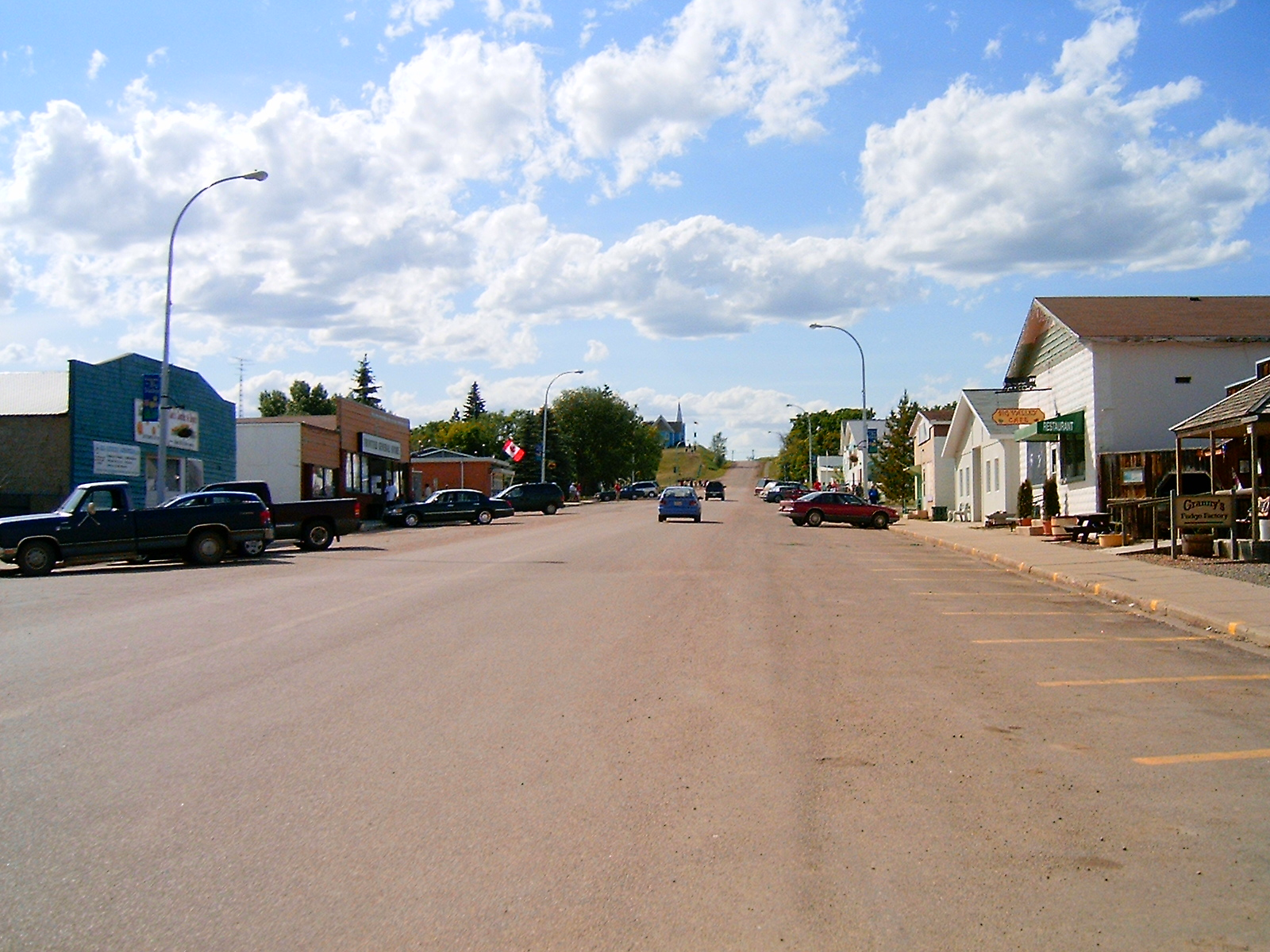
- Main Street

- Location within Alberta
- Coordinates: 52°02′01.0″N 112°45′25.0″W
- Country: Canada
- Province: Alberta
- Region: Central Alberta
- Census division: 7
- Founded: 1907
- Incorporated
  - Village: July 28, 1914
  - Town: November 15, 1920
  - Village: March 9, 1942

Government
  - Mayor: Chantelle Janke
  - Governing body: Big Valley Village Council
  - MP: Battle River—Crowfoot
  - MLAs: Drumheller-Stettler

Area (2021)
  - Land: 1.86 km^{2} (0.72 sq mi)
- Elevation: 840 m (2,760 ft)

Population (2021)
  - Total: 331
  - Density: 177.5/km^{2} (460/sq mi)
- Time zone: UTC−06:00 (Alberta Time)
- Postal code span: T0J
- Area code: +1-403
- Website: www.villageofbigvalley.ca

Big Valley is a village in central Alberta, Canada that is southeast of Red Deer. It is located 32 km (20 mi) south of Stettler and 64 km (40 mi) north of Drumheller on Highway 56 in the County of Stettler No. 6.

== History ==
=== Ranching era ===
Big Valley Alberta began to be settled even before 1910; people realized the value of the rich soil and natural grass known as Prairie Wool. Settlers began cattle farming operations and the town expanded. The Imperial Lease of land south-east of Big Valley consisted of thousands of acres of land owned by Pat Burns. Most of the land became an ecological reserve to preserve its natural flora.

=== Rail era ===
In 1911 the Canadian Northern Railway (CNoR) began to lay track through Big Valley. In 1912 Big Valley built a thriving terminal with a big roundhouse, stockyards, rail yards, water tower, coal-dock, general railway maintenance and repair facilities. It became a village in 1914 with a population of 500 growing to 803 in 1920 when it became a town. After the merger of Canadian Northern Railway and Grand Trunk Pacific railways to create Canadian National Railway (CNR) they believed there was no need of a railway to go through Big Valley. There are still the remains of the railway you can see with a walking self-tour.

In November 1986 Central Western Railway Corp. (later Railink) purchased the portion of CNR track from Ferlow Junction (seven miles south of Camrose) to Munson Junction (about seven miles (11 km) north of Drumheller). They began to haul grain along these lines from elevator to elevator on a regular basis.

Railink has sold most of the line to a salvage company and now the tracks extend from Stettler to Big Valley. This remaining portion is owned by a group named the East Central Alberta Heritage Society (ECHAC). Alberta Prairie Steam Tours (a Stettler-based group) rents the use of the track, from ECHAC, for their steam train excursions.

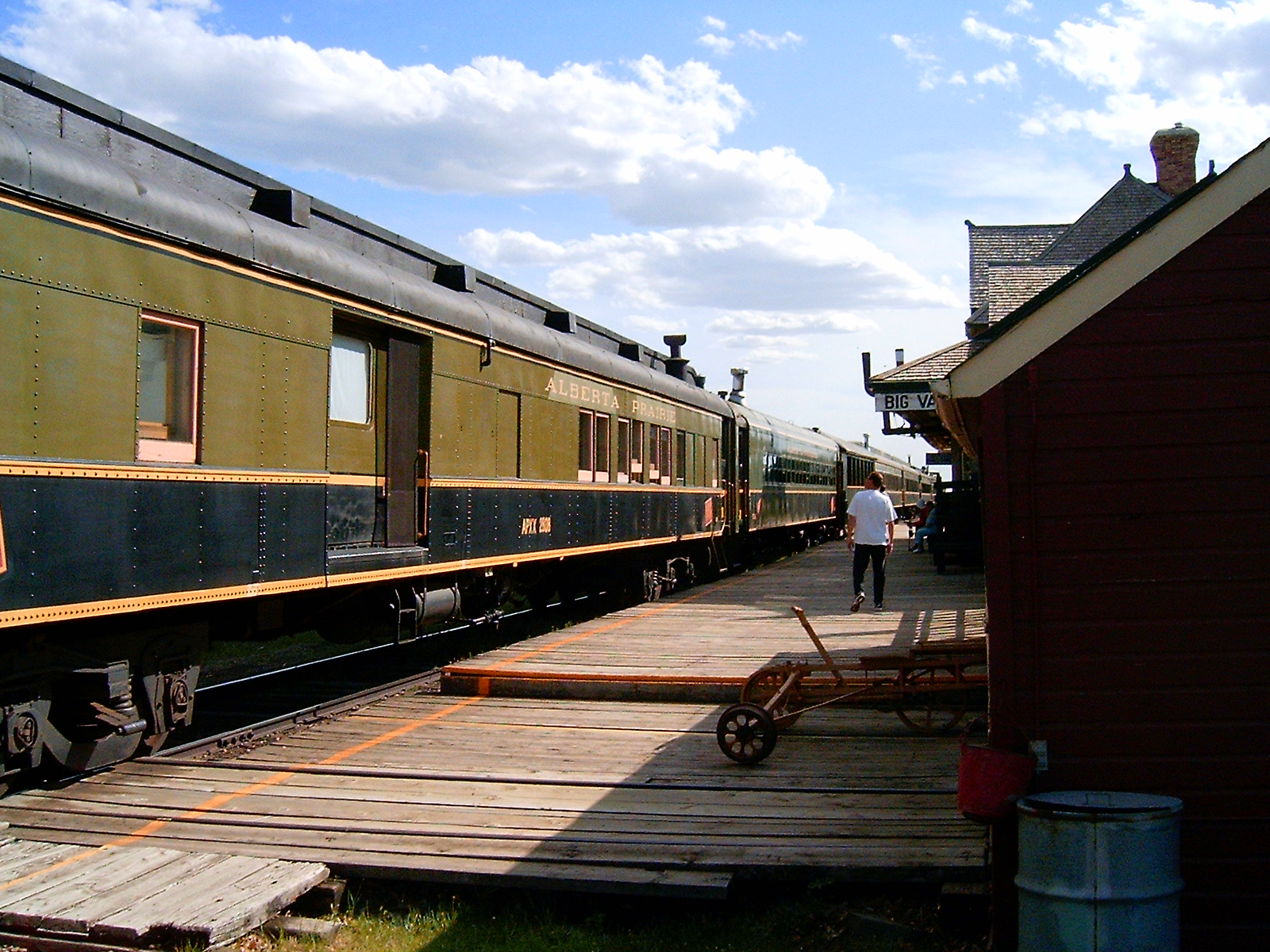
Train at Big Valley station

=== Coal era ===
Early explorers discovered coal along the dramatic cut banks of the Red Deer River—about 19 km (12 mi) west of Big Valley. Several small mines were later developed on the outskirts of Big Valley; but the largest of these many mines (Big Valley Collieries) opened in 1912. Located about 2 km (1.2 mi) north of Big Valley, it employed over 100 men and had its own school and hotel. Big Valley coal was all of a softer variety, suitable only for residential heating. The demand for this soft coal remained strong for many years and the mines continued to operate almost up to the time that gas and oil was discovered in Big Valley in 1950. The last local mine located 1 km (0.62 mi) north of the town was a "Strip Mine" which closed in 1952.

=== Oil boom ===
Up until the early 1950s, coal had been the commodity mined in the area. In the late 1940s, a blizzard in the Alberta foothills pushed the seismic operations eastward to Stettler. The move resulted in the discovery of oil near Big Valley. But more importantly, it spawned extensive oil and gas exploration throughout the county. That exploration resulted in the Big Valley No. 7 discovery well the following year, located 6 km (3.7 mi) south of Big Valley, Alberta. This well was completed in September 1950. Once developed, the Fenn-Big Valley field covered an area of 78.2 hectares (30.2 square miles). This field produced over 51 million cubic metres (321 million barrels) of oil and over 2.4 billion cubic metres (85 billion cubic feet) of solution gas. Small amounts of oil and gas remain to be produced from this field. The oil and gas formation lies 1,660 metres (5,450 ft) below the surface of the ground. At its peak, the Fenn-Big Valley Field produced 5,352 cubic metres (35,000 barrels) of oil a day for Gulf and similar amounts for Shell and Esso. The original portion of No. 7 well alone produced 95,700 cubic metres (626,000 barrels) of oil during its lifetime. Today, many of the pump jacks that dot the Big Valley landscape stand idle.

A local symbol of the importance of the petroleum industry is an oil pumper displayed in Memorial Park.

=== Historical places ===
St. Edmund's Anglican Church on the hill (the Blue Church) was built in 1916. It was started by a financial gift from Caroline Leffler (in England) who raised the $500 downpayment by making, and selling, children's clothing. She sent the money to the Anglican Diocese in Calgary, asking that it be used to help start an Anglican church anywhere in western Canada that they saw fit. At that time Big Valley, with its booming mining, ranching, and railroading industries in full swing, made it a logical spot for a new church. Walter Dennis, a local craftsman, built St. Edmund's Church.

The building contains the original pews (with a few additions), pump organ, and other furnishings. The last regular church service was held in the 1960s and the building soon became very weather-worn. A nearly broke Homecoming 1974 group obtained some unclaimed blue paint from a local lumber yard and the once cream-coloured church became blue.

== Demographics ==
In the 2021 Census of Population conducted by Statistics Canada, the Village of Big Valley had a population of 331 living in 159 of its 186 total private dwellings, a change of −4.3% from its 2016 population of 346. With a land area of 1.86 km^{2} (0.72 sq mi), it had a population density of 178.0/km^{2} (460.9/sq mi) in 2021.

The population of the Village of Big Valley according to its 2017 municipal census is 349, a change of 0.6% from its 2015 municipal census population of 347.

In the 2016 Census of Population conducted by Statistics Canada, the Village of Big Valley recorded a population of 346 living in 167 of its 189 total private dwellings, a −4.9% change from its 2011 population of 364. With a land area of 1.86 km^{2} (0.72 sq mi), it had a population density of 186.0/km^{2} (481.8/sq mi) in 2016.

== Geography ==
Big Valley is in central Alberta. The Village of Big Valley is located south of Stettler and is a busy little community one kilometre off Highway 56. Big Valley is centrally located in the southern part of the Battle River Tourist zone.

Big Valley has seen a 10.4% increase in population over the period of 1996 and 2001.

=== Location ===
- 32 km south of Stettler on Highway 56
- 60 km north of Drumheller on Highway 56
- 80 km east of Innisfail on Highway 590
- 204 km southeast of Edmonton

== Leisure ==
=== Arts and culture ===
As of the summer of 2005 Big Valley Amphitheatre will be hosting local talent including old time and modern country music, sing-a-longs and storytelling sessions.

On June 5, 2007, the Big Valley Creation Science Museum was opened in the village. The museum claims scientific evidence for the Genesis creation.

=== Golf ===
The Big Valley Golf Course is on the western edge of the village. It's a challenging nine-hole course with many hills on sand greens.

=== Parks ===
Ball Diamonds

Big Valley has a number of community ball teams and also hosts tournaments every year. Managed by the Big Valley Agricultural Society, facilities include ball diamonds, a playground, and access to the Agriplex for food services and dances.

Elks Playgrounds

There are several playgrounds available for the children of Big Valley, including the Elks Playground, the playground at the ball diamond and the playground at the Big Valley School.

Memorial Park

Located at 121 Main Street, West, residents typically enjoy Memorial Park with a picnic lunch. The War Memorial within the park pays respect to Canadian veterans and soldiers alike.

=== Facilities ===
Big Valley Agriplex

The Agriplex is Big Valley's main ice facility. It has seating for approximately 800 people and is home to many minor hockey games and tournaments. Time is also available for public skating.

Tennis Courts

Big Valley currently has two tennis courts available to residents and visitors of Big Valley that can also be used for tennis, playing basketball and skateboarding.

== Education ==
- Big Valley School - part of Clearview Public Schools

== Notable people ==
- Skeeter Thurston, rodeo competitor
- Zeke Thurston, rodeo world champion

== See also ==
- List of communities in Alberta
- List of villages in Alberta
