= Canadian Pacific 2816 =

Preserved CP H1b class 4-6-4 locomotive

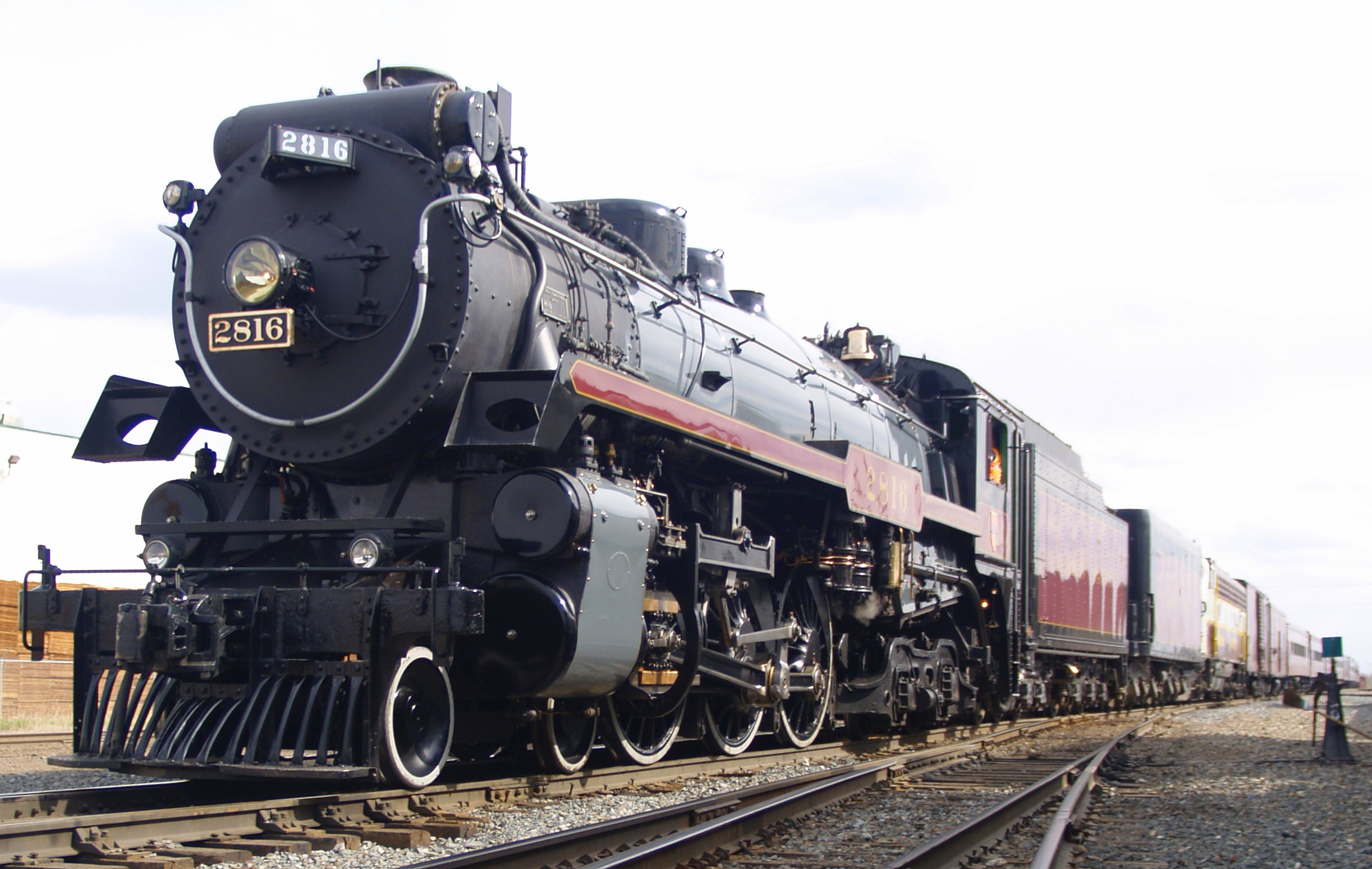
- CP No. 2816 Empress leading an excursion on May 10, 2008
Type and origin
- Power type: Steam
- Designer: Henry B. Bowen
- Builder: Montreal Locomotive Works
- Serial number: 68535
- Build date: December 1930
Specifications
- Configuration
  - Whyte: 4-6-4
  - UIC: 2′C2′
- Gauge: 4 ft 8 1/2 in (1,435 mm)
- Driver dia.: 75 in (1.9 m)
- Wheelbase: 80.52 ft (24.54 m)
  - Engine: 39.50 ft (12.04 m)
  - Drivers: 13.17 ft (4.01 m)
- Length: 91 ft 1 in (27.76 m)
- Adhesive weight: 194,000 lb (88 t)
- Loco weight: 351,200 lb (159.3 t)
- Tender weight: 291,000 lb (132 t)
- Total weight: 643,100 lb (291.7 t)
- Fuel type: New: Coal; Now: Oil
- Fuel capacity: 17 short tons (15 t)
- Water cap.: 12,000 imp gal (55,000 L; 14,000 US gal)
- Firebox
  - Grate area: 80.80 sq ft (7.507 m^{2})
- Boiler pressure: 275 psi (1.90 MPa)
- Heating surface
  - Firebox: 352 sq ft (32.7 m^{2})
  - Tubes: 61 - 2.25 in (57 mm)
  - Flues: 171 - 3.5 in (89 mm)
  - Tubes and flues: 18.25 ft (5.56 m)
  - Total surface: 5,475 sq ft (508.6 m^{2})
- Superheater
  - Heating area: 1,640 sq ft (152 m^{2})
- Cylinders: Two, outside
- Cylinder size: 22 in × 30 in (559 mm × 762 mm)
- Valve gear: Walschaerts
- Valve type: Piston valves
- Loco brake: Air
- Train brakes: Air
- Couplers: Knuckle
Performance figures
- Maximum speed: 100 mph (160 km/h) (average)
- Power output: 4,700 hp (3,500 kW)
- Tractive effort: 45,254 lbf (201.30 kN)
Career
- Operators: Canadian Pacific Railway; Canadian Pacific Kansas City
- Class: H1b
- Numbers: CP 2816
- Official name: Empress
- Retired: May 26, 1960
- Preserved: January 1964
- Restored: August 16, 2001
- Current owner: Canadian Pacific Kansas City
- Disposition: Operational

Canadian Pacific 2816, also known as the "Empress", is a preserved H1b class 4-6-4 "Hudson" type steam locomotive, built by the Montreal Locomotive Works (MLW) in December 1930 for the Canadian Pacific Railway (CP). It is the only non-streamlined H1 Hudson to be preserved.

The locomotive was primarily used in pulling passenger trains in revenue service for thirty years, before it was retired in May 1960. In 1963, it was sold to F. Nelson Blount, who added it to his Steamtown, U.S.A. collection in Bellows Falls, Vermont. After becoming surplus in the collection by the National Park Service, No. 2816 was reacquired by the CP in 1998, and crews from BC Rail were hired to extensively restore it to operating condition.

In 2001, the Empress returned to service, and it was used by the CP in occasional excursion service as part of their steam excursion program. In late 2012, the CP steam program was discontinued, and No. 2816 remained stored at the CP's headquarters in Calgary, Alberta. Following the CP's merger with the Kansas City Southern to become the new Canadian Pacific Kansas City in 2023, No. 2816 returned to service again in 2024, embarking on a continental tour from April 24 to July 10.

== History ==
=== Revenue service ===
No. 2816 was one of ten H1b-class (Nos. 2810-2819) (Note: The "H" refers to the 4-6-4 wheel configuration, the "1" is the design number, and the "b" means it was the second production run.) 4-6-4 Hudson-types built by the Montreal Locomotive Works in December 1930, at a cost of $116,555 each. It was first assigned to premier passenger service between Winnipeg and Fort William, Ontario.

Following the introduction of semi-streamlined Royal Hudson locomotives in 1937, No. 2816 was reassigned to secondary passenger service between Windsor, Ontario, and Quebec City, and during the 1950s, it pulled commuter trains between Montreal and Rigaud, Quebec. In 1957, No. 2816 received a minor overhaul, with its tender being replaced with one from Royal Hudson No. 2822. The locomotive was retired from revenue service on May 26, 1960, after accumulating 2,046,000 miles (3,293,000 kilometres). It was subsequently used briefly as a stationary boiler at the St. Luc yards in Montreal.

=== Steamtown ownership ===
In the early 1960s, F. Nelson Blount wanted to expand his Steamtown, U.S.A. collection, and one of the locomotives he initially wanted to preserve was a 4-6-4 from the New York Central Railroad. Since all NYC 4-6-4s were scrapped by that time, Blount improvised by purchasing No. 2816 from the CP in December 1963. The locomotive was removed from the scrap lines of Angus, Ontario, and it was put on static display at Steamtown's first location in Bellows Falls, Vermont.

During No. 2816's time on static display, the locomotive deteriorated from the outdoor elements, and it worsened its condition for several years. In the winter of 1983–1984, it was moved along with the rest of the collection to Scranton, Pennsylvania, where Steamtown was later reorganized as Steamtown National Historic Site under the ownership of the National Park Service. Following the reorganization, No. 2816 was deemed surplus in the collection, and Steamtown wanted to dispose of it.

=== Restoration ===
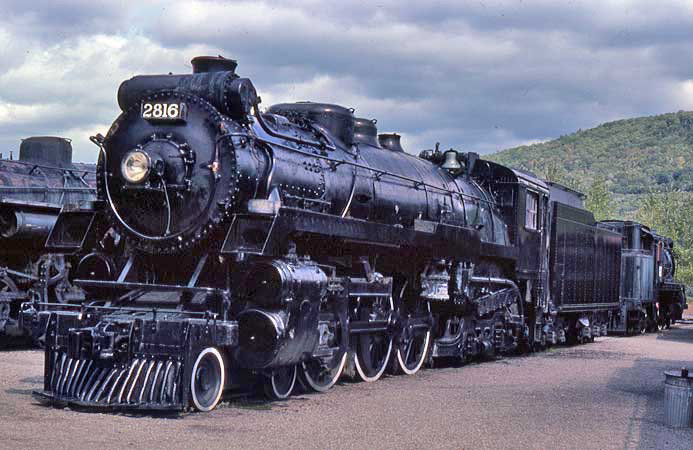
CP No. 2816 on static display at Steamtown, USA, in Bellows Falls, Vermont, in 1978

During the mid-late 1990s, the Canadian Pacific Railway's then-president and CEO, Robert Ritchie, reorganized the company and established the "Royal Canadian Pacific" excursion train to honour the railway's history, and he sought for CP to operate their own steam excursion program. In 1998, the CP purchased No. 2816 from Steamtown, and in exchange, the railway would move some equipment to Scranton. CP had heard of its availability via phone calls from BC Rail, who had been operating CP Royal Hudson No. 2860 as part of their own excursion program; the No. 2860 crews had been looking for replacement parts for the Royal Hudson and were offered to buy the entire locomotive by Steamtown.

A team of inspectors performed a preliminary inspection on No. 2816, and they pronounced that it was in good condition. In September 1998, the locomotive was coupled in a special consist led by CP GP38-2 No. 3069, FP7 No. 1400, and St. Lawrence and Hudson GP9u No. 8216, and it was ferried from Scranton to Montreal via Binghamton and Albany, New York, before travelling cross-country to the BC Rail steam workshop in North Vancouver, British Columbia. CP contracted the BC Rail steam shop crew, led by Al Broadfoot, to disassemble No. 2816 and evaluate its condition; if it were salvageable, then they would restore it to operating condition, but if it were deteriorated beyond salvaging, then they would give it a cosmetic restoration for static display purposes.

When No. 2816 was disassembled, it was revealed that it was mechanically worn out, despite the preliminary inspectors having stated otherwise, but Rob Ritchie decided to approve a complete rebuild of the locomotive, regardless. Broadfoot and his team were able to obtain multiple plans and vital information about CP H1b class locomotives, including a collection of over 800 technical drawings provided by the Canada Science and Technology Museum, and they used them as references for the project. Hundreds of replacement parts had to be fabricated by contractors in Vancouver, such as the cab, the running boards, the rod brasses, the superheater manifold, among other things.

Contractors in the United States were hired to overhaul other major parts of No. 2816; the driving wheels were shipped to the Tennessee Valley Railroad Museum in Chattanooga, Tennessee, and the boiler was shipped to Doyle McCormack and his crews in Portland, Oregon. No. 2816's firebox was converted from coal to oil firing, and the tender received dual water intakes with Canadian and American threads. CP gained so much faith in the project that on April 19, 2000, the railway announced that No. 2816 would be scheduled to return to service for their steam program by September of that year, but the deadline was pushed back, due to further challenges encountered in the restoration process.

=== CP excursion service and temporary hiatus ===
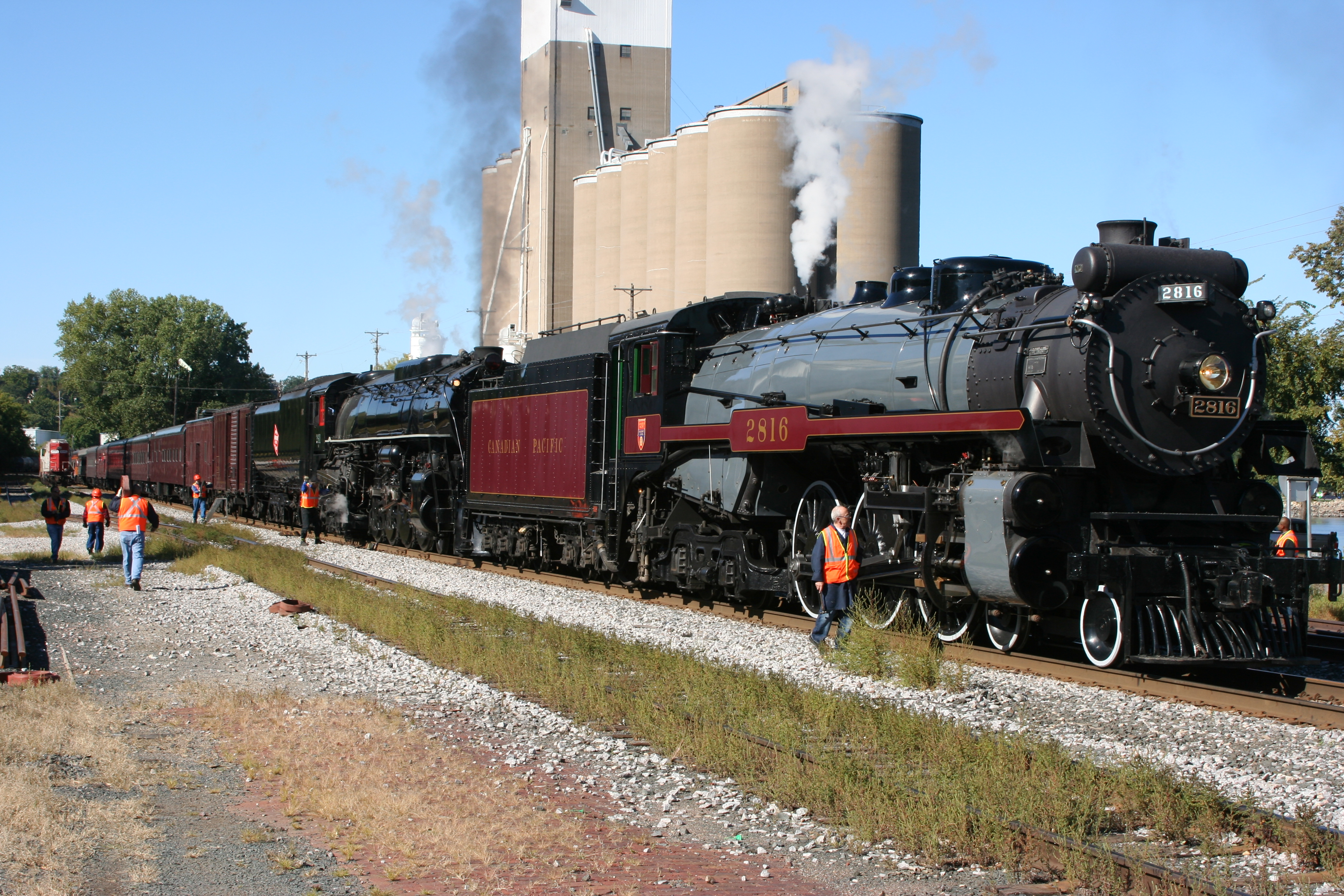
No. 2816 double-heading with Milwaukee Road 261 in Red Wing, Minnesota

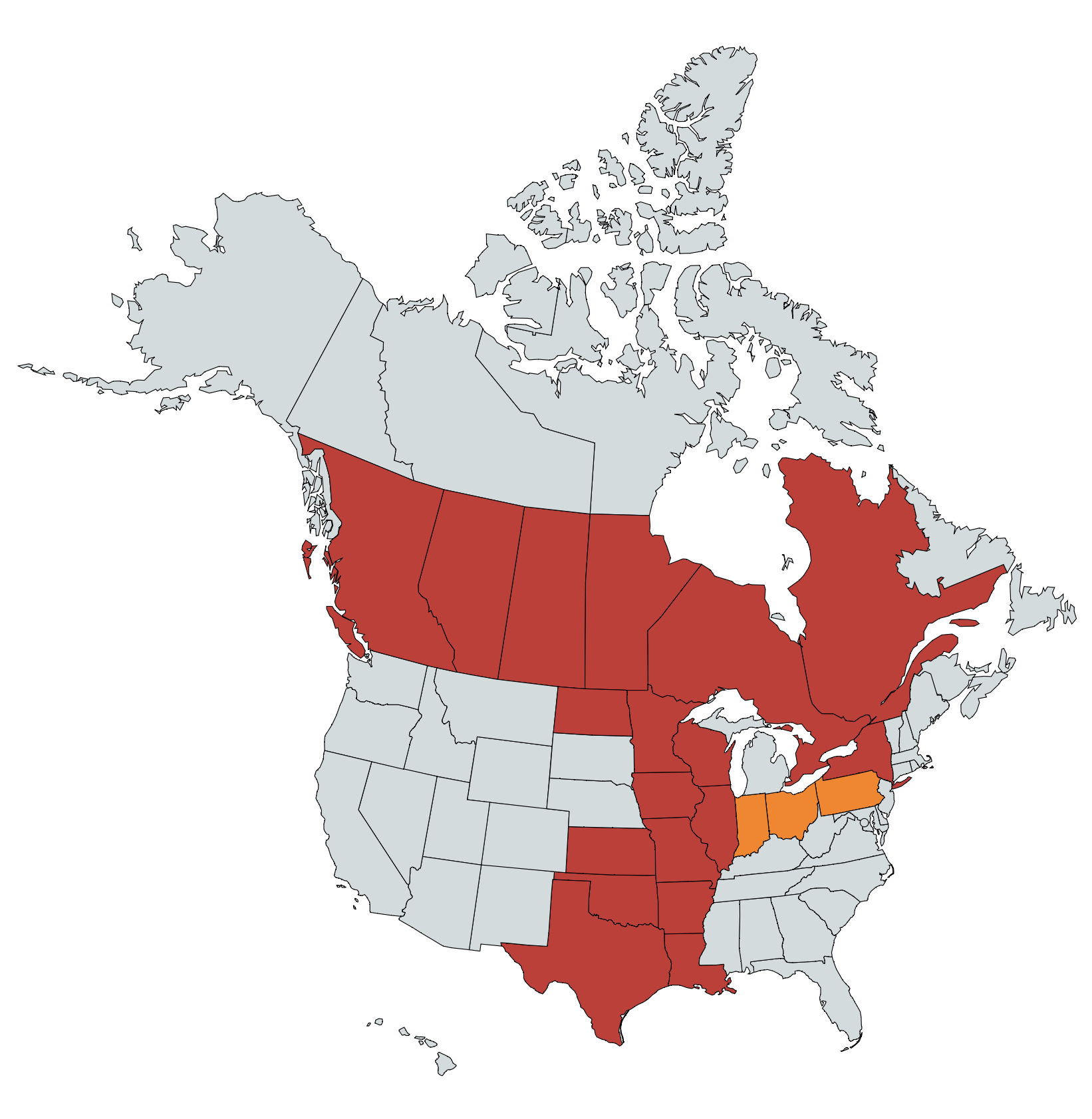
Canadian provinces and US states visited by No. 2816 in excursion service. Note: No. 2816 was towed through the states in orange

On August 15, 2001, No. 2816 passed its federal boiler inspection, and the following day, the locomotive was fired up for the first time in forty years, performing a series of test runs over three days on CP's Cascade Subdivision between Coquitlam and Mission. From September 19 to 23—with Al Broadfoot as the fireman and with Bill Stettler and Doyle McCormack taking turns as the engineer—No. 2816 pulled its first official excursion out of Port Moody, toured some of the CP mainlines for 672 miles (1,081 kilometres) over five days, and then it stopped at CP's headquarters in Calgary, Alberta. (Note: To expand its water capacity, the locomotive was paired with CP auxiliary tender No. 35508, which was formerly paired with Delaware and Hudson 4-6-6-4 "Challenger" No. 1517.) The locomotive began pulling additional public relations excursions for the Canadian Pacific Railway, and it quickly received the name "The Empress".

On May 16, 2002, the locomotive pulled two excursions for the West Coast Express. Between May 24 and July 8, 2003, No. 2816 toured the CP between Alberta and Ontario, and the purpose of the tour was to spread further public awareness of CP and to raise money for the children's "Breakfast for Learning" program. On September 27, No. 2816 visited the Kamloops Heritage Railway and took part in a doubleheader excursion with Canadian National 2-8-0 No. 2141. In May 2004, No. 2816 pulled the Royal Canadian Pacific consist while performing a 3,000-mile (4,800 km) tour across the CP between Vancouver and Montreal, and it marked the first time in fifty years that a single steam locomotive pulled a cross-country passenger train in Canada, but it was assisted by three CP heritage diesels.

In early June 2004, the Empress was ferried behind a Soo Line SD60 over the CSX mainline between Buffalo, New York, and Chicago, Illinois, and then it travelled to the Twin Cities area in Minnesota to participate in the Grand Excursion 2004 event, which celebrated the 150th anniversary of the Chicago and Rock Island Railroad's celebration train of 1854. No. 2816 pulled multiple public excursions for the event between the Twin Cities and the Quad Cities area in Iowa, using passenger coaches owned by Friends of the 261, and the last train took place on July 3; a doubleheader with Milwaukee Road 261 from St. Paul to La Crescent and return. No. 2816 returned from Minnesota to Calgary with a charity train later that same month.

In August 2007, No. 2816 toured the CP from Calgary to Chicago, and then it pulled some public excursions within Illinois and Wisconsin, including another doubleheader with No. 261 on September 15 between Minneapolis and La Crosse, Wisconsin. The Empress returned to Calgary by the end of September. At the end of the 2008 operating season, the Canadian Pacific Railway put the steam program on hold—while still operating previously promised engagement runs—due to financial challenges created by the Great Recession. No. 2816 did not operate at all in 2009, but crews opted to take advantage of the down time to perform some extensive maintenance work on the Empress and its passenger car fleet.

No. 2816 returned to service again on June 6, 2010, when it pulled excursions to raise money for the Children's Wish Foundation. The locomotive was also filmed with IMAX cameras for Rocky Mountain Express, a 2011 film that observes the Empress on a journey from Vancouver to Montreal while explaining the CP's history. On June 11, 2011, No. 2816 lead an excursion tour that promoted the Children's Wish Foundation. The locomotive was scheduled to complete the tour on August 5 at Calgary, but as it was midway through the tour, No. 2816 suffered a mechanical problem, and it had to return to Calgary early for repairs.

In late 2012, Canadian Pacific CEO Fred Green—Rob Ritchie's successor—stepped down from the company, and E. Hunter Harrison succeeded him. Harrison was not interested in steam locomotive operations, and wanted CP to focus on improving their finances and operation tactics. As a result, the steam program was discontinued, forcing No. 2816's excursion operations to be halted, and the locomotive was kept in storage in Calgary. Despite Harrison's resignation from the railway in early 2017, with Keith Creel succeeding him, the locomotive still remained in storage afterward.

On November 13, 2020, No. 2816 was fired up for a steam test and moved around the Calgary Yard with a railroad representative stating the test was to assess the locomotive's mechanical condition with "no plans to operate the engine on the main lines." It was subsequently announced that the locomotive would make a run as part of filming of a Holiday Train video.

=== CPKC excursion service ===
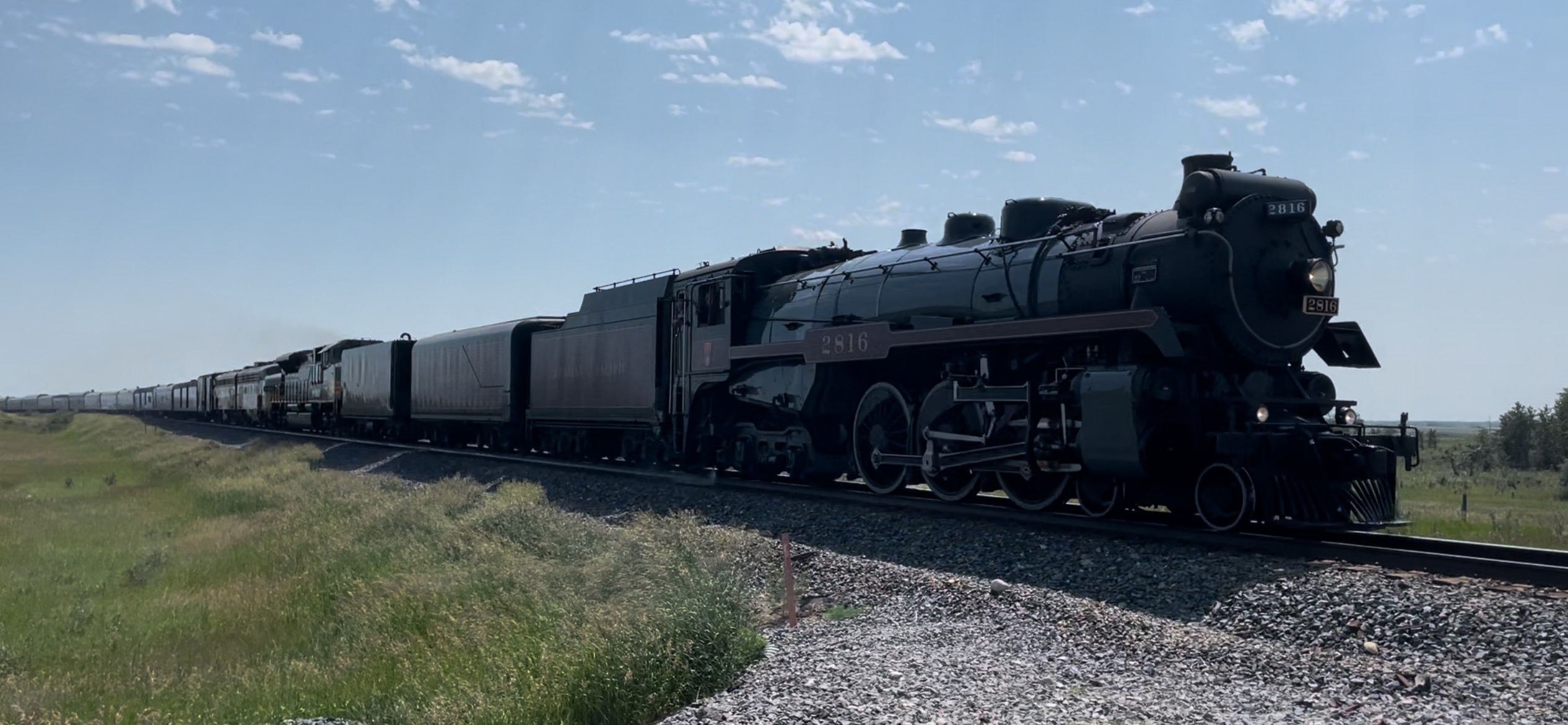
No. 2816 during its Final Spike Steam Tour, July 10, 2024, in Gleichen, Alberta

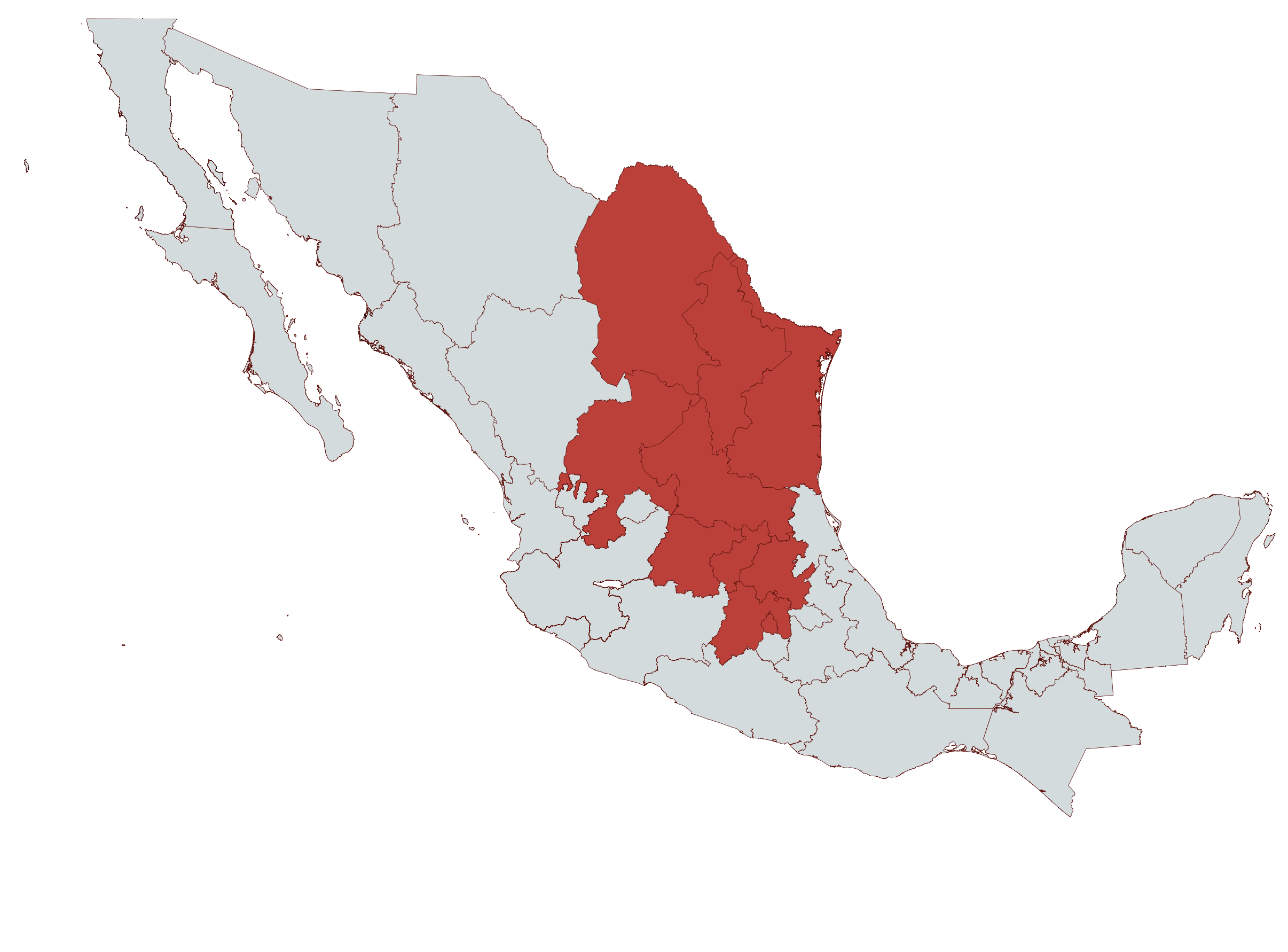
Mexican states visited by No. 2816 in excursion service

In 2021, Creel announced that if the US Surface Transportation Board approved CP's merger with the Kansas City Southern, the railway would celebrate it by bringing No. 2816 back under steam to lead a tour from Calgary to Mexico City, making No. 2816 the first steam locomotive to run through Canada, the United States, and Mexico. The locomotive first received an overhaul by CP's steam crew, and in the process, it was equipped with positive train control.

In June 2023, the overhaul was completed, and the Empress began a series of test runs, which included a July 11 shakedown run from Calgary to Carseland and return. Further shakedown runs and tests were performed in August, from Calgary to Coalhurst and return. In October, two back-to-back test runs from Calgary to Edmonton and back then from Calgary to Medicine Hat and back, concluding No. 2816's test runs of 2023. (Note: In preparation for No. 2816's tour, the locomotive was paired with a second auxiliary tender that the CPKC borrowed from the Oregon Rail Heritage Foundation. The tender was commonly paired with Southern Pacific 4449.)

On April 24, 2024, No. 2816 began its Final Spike Steam Tour running from Calgary to Mexico City with several display stops. On April 28, it was displayed in Moose Jaw. On April 29, it crossed the Canadian border into the United States; where it had a displays stop in Minot, North Dakota, on April 30; Saint Paul, Minnesota, on May 3; Franklin Park, Illinois, on May 8; Davenport, Iowa, on May 10; Kansas City, Missouri, on May 18; Shreveport, Louisiana, on May 24; and Laredo, Texas, on May 28. On May 30, it crossed the US border into Mexico, where it had display stops in Monterrey, Nuevo León, on May 31; and Mexico City on June 7. The train's journey in Mexico was not without incident, however. On June 4, just three days before arriving at Mexico City, No. 2816 passed through Nopala de Villagrán and fatally struck a 29-year-old woman, who attempted to take a selfie at an unsafe distance. After being seen by thousands in Mexico City, the locomotive departed for its return trip north on June 9, arriving in Laredo on June 11. On the return trip to Calgary, No. 2816 made two whistle stops at Silvis, Illinois, on June 29 and met Union Pacific 6936 in a nose-to-nose ceremony. It also met Union Pacific 3985 and Union Pacific 5511 which were then under restoration in the organization's shops. The locomotive then had a display stop in Winnipeg on July 6, before arriving back at Calgary on July 10. (Note: Originally, No. 2816 was about to pull a special fundraiser June 29 public excursion from Silvis to Bureau Junction, Illinois, on the Iowa Interstate Railroad, but the CPKC cancelled it on May 30.) As part of the Final Spike Steam Tour, CP 2816 was joined by hydrogen fuel cell locomotive No. 1001 at the start of the journey. This collaboration symbolized the convergence of tradition and modernity, showcasing CP's efforts to honour its steam heritage while embracing sustainable technology for the future of rail transport.

After the Final Spike tour, CPKC stored the locomotive at the Calgary shops. In December 2024, Jim Vena, Union Pacific's CEO, expressed interest in having the Empress join UP's Big Boy No. 4014 for a special event.

No. 2816 was steamed up on September 19, 2025, for the world premiere of Pulse of the Continent, a documentary focusing on the Final Spike Steam Tour. The locomotive went to the Royal Canadian Pacific Pavilion in Calgary and displayed during the afterparty of the weekend premiere on September 20. No. 2816 also hauled hydrogen unit CPKC No. 1100 to the event, with both locomotives being on display.

== Preservation and other remaining H1 Hudsons ==
Of the five surviving Canadian Pacific Hudsons out of the original 65 built between 1929 and 1940, No. 2816 is the only survivor of the non-streamlined H1a and H1b classes built in 1929 and 1930. The four other remaining sister engines to 2816 are the semi-streamlined Royal Hudsons (Nos. 2820–2864). The remaining four Royal Hudsons are Nos. 2839 (H1c), 2850 and 2858 (both H1d) and the 2860 (H1e). As of 2024, No. 2816 is the only operating 4-6-4 Hudson in North America; no American 4-6-4 Hudsons are operational.

== See also ==
- Canadian Pacific 1201
- Canadian Pacific 2317
- Canadian Pacific 2860
- Canadian Pacific Railway § Steam locomotives
- Canadian National 6060

== Bibliography ==
- McDonnell, Greg (February 2002). "Canadian Triumph: The Return of 2816". Trains. Vol. 62, no. 2. Kalmbach Publishing. pp. 52–55.
