= Iron Road (film) =

- Poster
- Written by: Barry Pearson; Raymond Storey
- Directed by: David Wu
- Starring: Sun Li; Luke Macfarlane; Sam Neill; Peter O'Toole; Charlotte Sullivan
- Original language: English

Production
- Producers: Anne Tait; Barry Pearson; Raymond Hart Massey II
- Running time: 190 minutes
- Production companies: CBC; Iron Road Productions; Mainland Productions

Original release
- Release: August 9 – August 16, 2009

Iron Road is a 2009 Canada/China television miniseries written by Barry Pearson and Raymond Storey and directed by David Wu. Starring Sun Li, Luke Macfarlane, Peter O'Toole, Sam Neill, and Charlotte Sullivan, Iron Road chronicles the untold story of Chinese workers who helped to build the Canadian Pacific Railway in the 1880s. The mini-series was filmed in the Kamloops, B.C. area with many local actors.

Iron Road is only the second joint venture to be created under a Canada/China co-production treaty established in the 1960s. The first was 1989's Bethune: The Making of a Hero.

== Plot ==
Iron Road follows the journey of Little Tiger (Sun Li), a child whose quest for her long-lost father takes her from a fireworks factory in China to a remote construction camp in the Rockies. Lured by the myth of the Gold Mountain (金山), she and her countrymen travel to Canada by the thousands to do the back-breaking work of blasting through the mountains to lay track. She soon learns that railroads bring fortune only to few and that every mile of track is purchased with fear and death. As treachery and prejudice threaten her, Little Tiger must use her wits and courage to fulfill her quest and honor her friends who died in this foreign land.

Little Tiger disguises herself as a man, but develops a crush on the contractor's son, James Nichol. They become friends, him treating her as just "one of the guys." At one point, he takes his clothes off and jumps into a river for a swim, asking her to join him. She declines profusely, but secretly glances at his naked form when he isn't looking. Later, she reveals to him that she is a woman and confesses her attraction. They begin an affair, which continues until disrupted when the Chinese construction foreman dies saving her when her safety rope breaks as she places dynamite charges on a cliff. It is discovered that the bookman is actually the father she has been looking for and that the rope had been sabotaged deliberately. Learning that her father's last wish was to have his ashes returned to China, she decides to leave the railway camp to do so. James wants to leave Canada with her so they can spend their lives together, but she refuses because they are from different worlds and she fears the "social implications" as Interracial relationships were generally discouraged at the time.

== Cast ==
- Sun Li as Little Tiger
- Luke Macfarlane as James Nichol
- Peter O'Toole as Lionel Relic
- Sam Neill as Alfred Nichol
- Serge Houde as George Grant
- Charlotte Sullivan as Melanie Grant
- Tony Leung Ka Fai as Book Man
- Kenneth Mitchell as Edgar

== Production ==
Principal photography was shot in Hengdian World Studios (China) and in British Columbia, Canada. The Canadian shoot locations were filmed in the Kamloops area of the Thompson-Nicola Regional District and Kelowna.

Authentic wood trestle bridges built by the Canadian Pacific Railway during the Gold Rush of the early 1900s were used for film locations.

Kamloops Heritage Railway's 2141 locomotive was brought in, and a section of actual railway was used, which was discontinued from service during the shoot.

The background performers cast as immigrant labourers in the Canadian shoot were mostly Asians from Vancouver, British Columbia, Canada. An additional performer's fee was offered to those who were willing to shave their heads for an authentic period look. Professional hairstylists were employed to hand costume the traditional Chinese long hair braid.

== Awards ==
- Leo Award (win) Best Cinematography in a Feature Length Drama for Attila Szalay
- Leo Award (win) Best Production Design in a Features Length Drama for Linda Del Rosario
- Leo Award (win) Best Costume Design in a Feature Length Drama for Maya Mani
- Leo Award (win) Best Make-Up in a Feature Length Drama for Joanne Kinchella
- Dominican Film Festival, Audience Favourite Award at the Dominican Film Festival
- Roma FictionFest 2008, Best Actress, miniseries for Sun Li
