= Excursion train =

Chartered train run for a special event or purpose

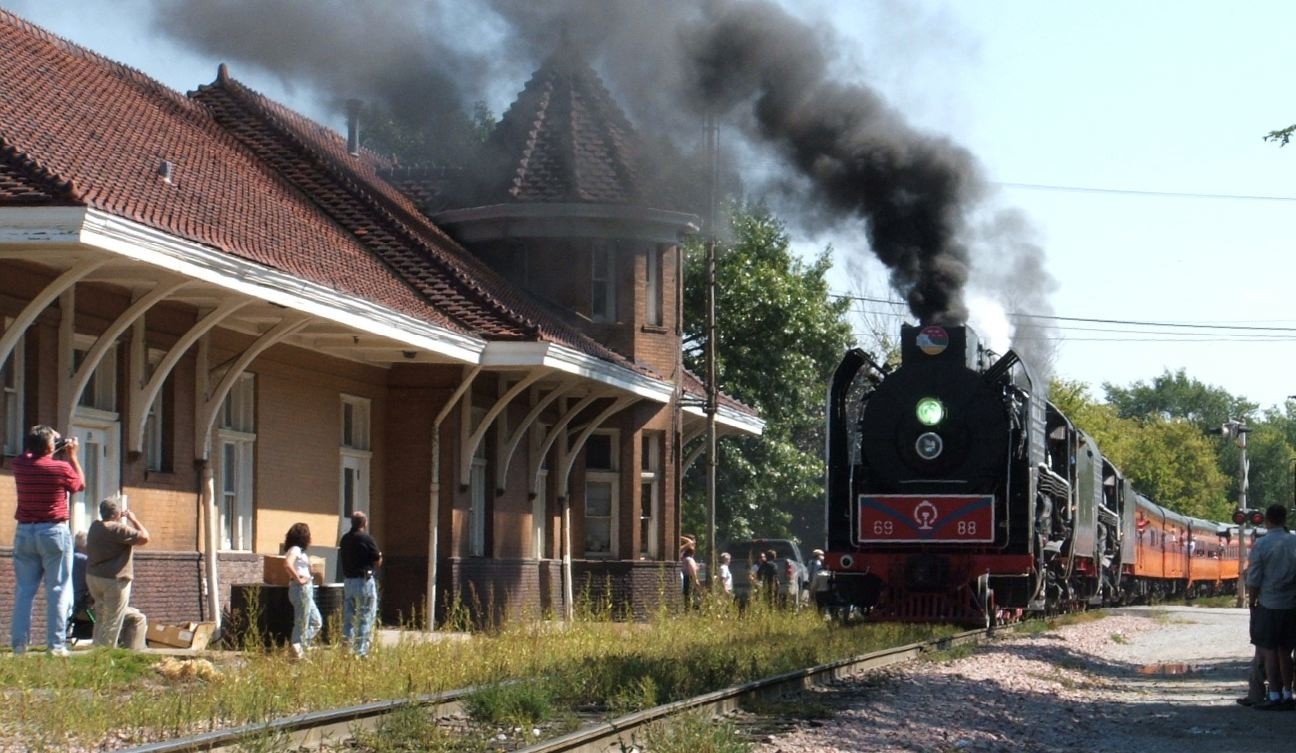
A steam-powered excursion train stops at the Chicago, Rock Island & Pacific Railroad Passenger Station in Iowa City, Iowa in 2006

An excursion train is a chartered train run for a special event or purpose. Examples are trains to major sporting event, trains run for railfans or tourists, and special trains operated by the railway company for employees and prominent customers.

== United Kingdom ==
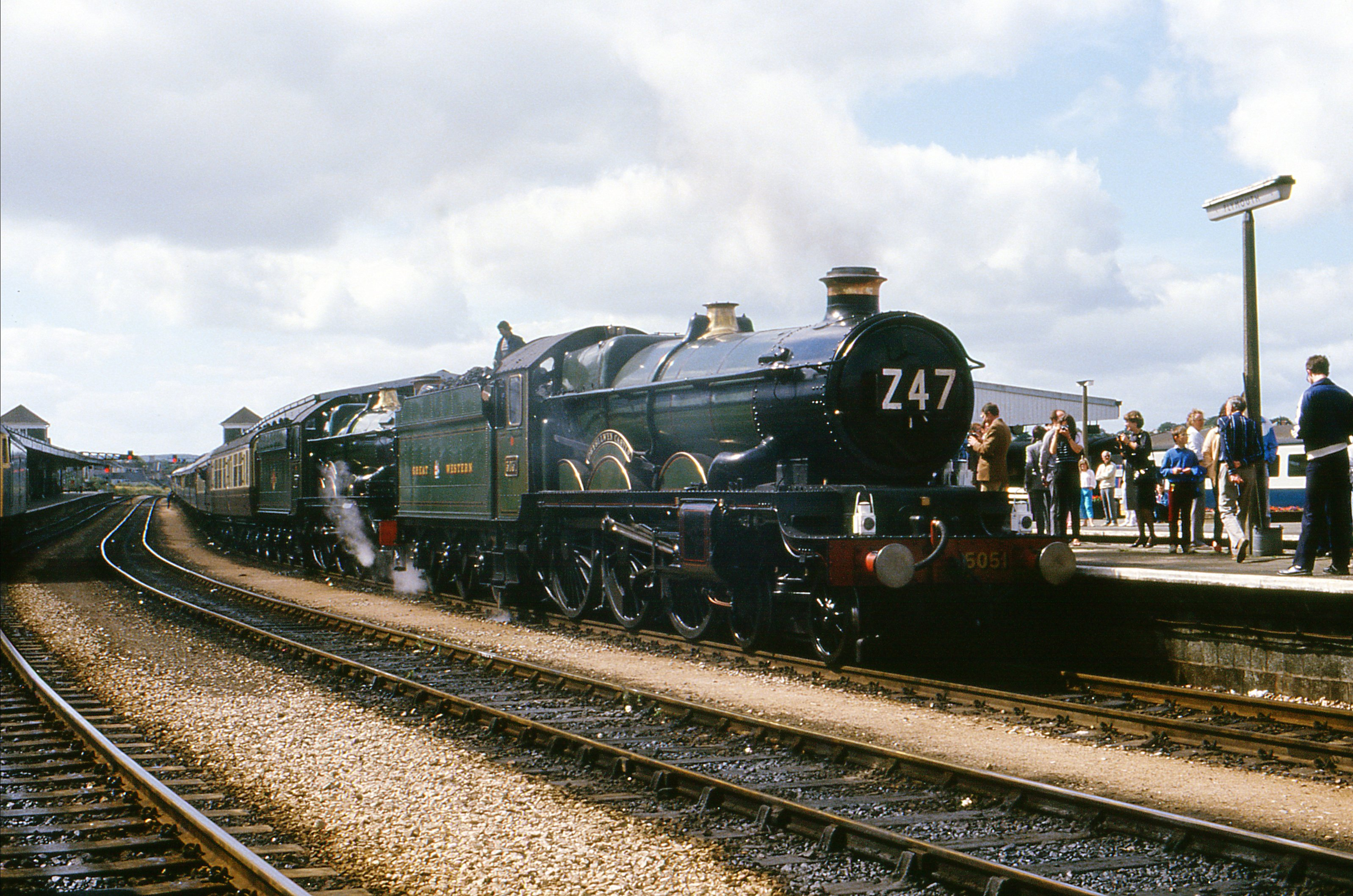
5051 Drysllwyn Castle and 7029 Clun Castle at Plymouth while working "The Great Western Limited" railtour from Bristol to Plymouth in July 1985.

A number of excursion trains are run in the United Kingdom and in some cases there are regular steam worked passenger services over some routes, one such train being The Jacobite which runs Monday to Friday from Fort William to Mallaig from April to October. A second afternoon train also runs from May to mid September but on weekdays only, weekend services running from June to October. A number of Christmas Jacobite's have even started running on select days in December. There are also a number of routes across the UK which are famed for running excursion trains, examples include: Settle & Carlisle line, Cumbrian Coast Line, Shakespeare line, Scarborough line, West Coast Main Line and East Coast Main Line.

As well as using steam locomotives that saw use for British Railways and other mainline operating companies, new build steam engines are shown to be as popular as vintage steam engines. The youngest steam engine to run railtours being 60163 Tornado built in 2008.

The train operating companies that operate steam locomotives on the national network include: West Coast Railways, DB Cargo UK, Locomotive Services Limited. and Vintage Trains.

Tour operators in the UK include: The Railway Touring Company, Steam Dreams, Statesman Rail, Torbay Express, Vintage Trains, Orient-Express, UK Railtours and Saphos Trains. Further details can be found on the Main Line Steam Tours index page.

== United States ==
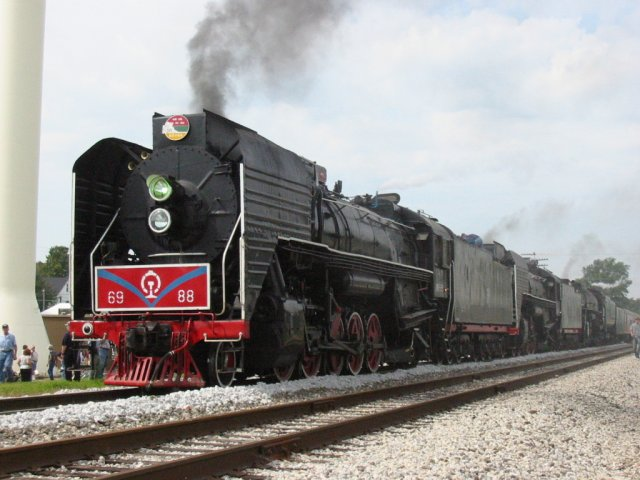
Preserved China Railways QJ class locomotives 6988 and 7081 operating a triple-headed excursion train with Milwaukee Road 261 on the Iowa Interstate Railroad in 2006

The Pennsylvania Railroad ran special excursion trains from New York City and Washington, D.C. to the Army–Navy Game in years when the game was held in Philadelphia at Municipal Stadium (1936–1941, 1945–1975). The special Pennsylvania trains were discontinued as the railroad, then known as Penn Central was on the brink of declaring bankruptcy, with the last trains running for the 1975 game. The tradition of running excursion trains to the Army-Navy college football game was resurrected in 2005 when philanthropists Bennett and Vivian Levin chartered a special train composed of their own locomotives and some donated passenger cars to take recuperating wounded veterans from the Walter Reed Army Medical Center in Washington and the Bethesda Naval Hospital in Bethesda, Maryland to the game in Philadelphia. The Army-Navy Game trains ran in 2005–2008, were suspended in 2009 due to a death in the sponsors' family, and again in 2010. The Army-Navy football game is a big enough event in Philadelphia that the local rail transit company SEPTA also runs extra trains on game day.

Since 1908, an excursion train has carried travelers between Denver, Colorado's Union Station and the Cheyenne Depot Museum to attend the Cheyenne Frontier Days rodeo event. The train was sponsored by The Denver Post and the Union Pacific Railroad, the latter which provided the rolling stock. However, it was announced in 2019 that the excursion would no longer operate, with the Union Pacific Railroad's vintage fleet being a contributing factor.

Southern Pacific Railroad operated a Suntan Special from San Francisco Bay area cities to the Santa Cruz Beach Boardwalk every summer Sunday and holiday from 1927 through 1959.

Since 2013, Amtrak has operated the Autumn Express every year during late October or early November. It is an excursion train that runs on lines normally used only for freight. The train originates and ends at the same station. Past trips have included Philadelphia–Harrisburg via the NEC, the port road branch, and the keystone corridor; Philadelphia–Harrisburg via Reading, and Albany/Schenectady to East Deerfield, Massachusetts via the Hoosac Tunnel.

The Union Pacific Railroad has hosted an excursion program since 1960. Their heritage fleet includes two historic steam locomotives and three historic diesel locomotives, accompanied by a fleet of historic passenger cars. Included in the fleet of steam locomotives are Union Pacific 4014, the largest operating steam locomotive in the world, and Union Pacific 844, the only steam locomotive never retired by a North American Class I railroad. Also included are Union Pacific 949, 951, and 963B, a trio of historic streamlined locomotives. There was also a third steam locomotive: Union Pacific 3985, which operated in excursion service from 1981 to 2010. It was retired from excursion service in January 2020 as a result of its poor condition. Union Pacific 6936, the only operating example of the longest single-unit diesel locomotive ever built, was also used in excursion service until 2016. In April 2022, Union Pacific donated Nos. 3985 and 6936 to the Railroading Heritage of Midwest America, alongside another steam locomotive, Union Pacific 5511, where they will be restored to operating condition.

Seasonal excursion trains in the U.S. include ski trains which operate in winter, with emphasis on weekend service, and the Train to the Game in the New York City area, which goes to Yankee Stadium in the summer and the New Jersey Meadowlands in the fall.

== Other countries ==
Pictures of excursion trains in various countries.

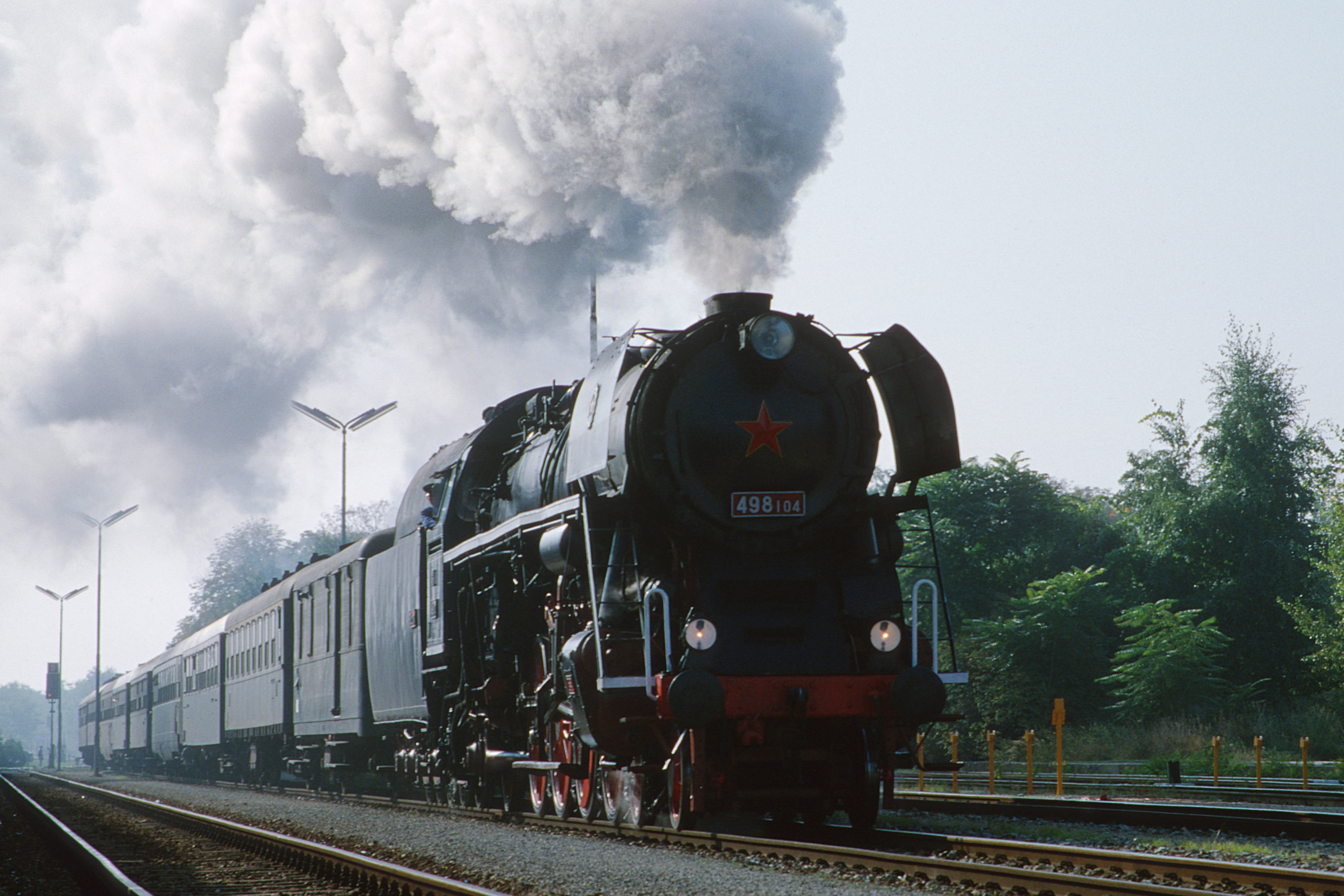
Austria

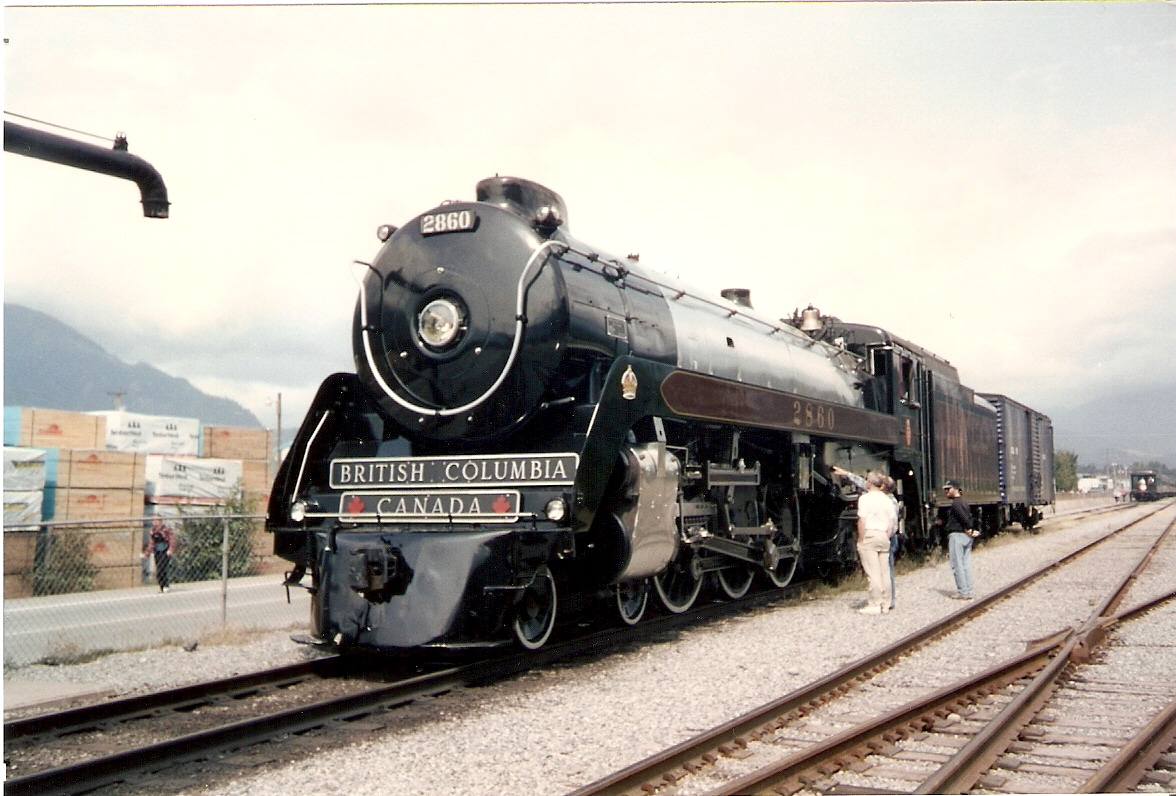
Canada

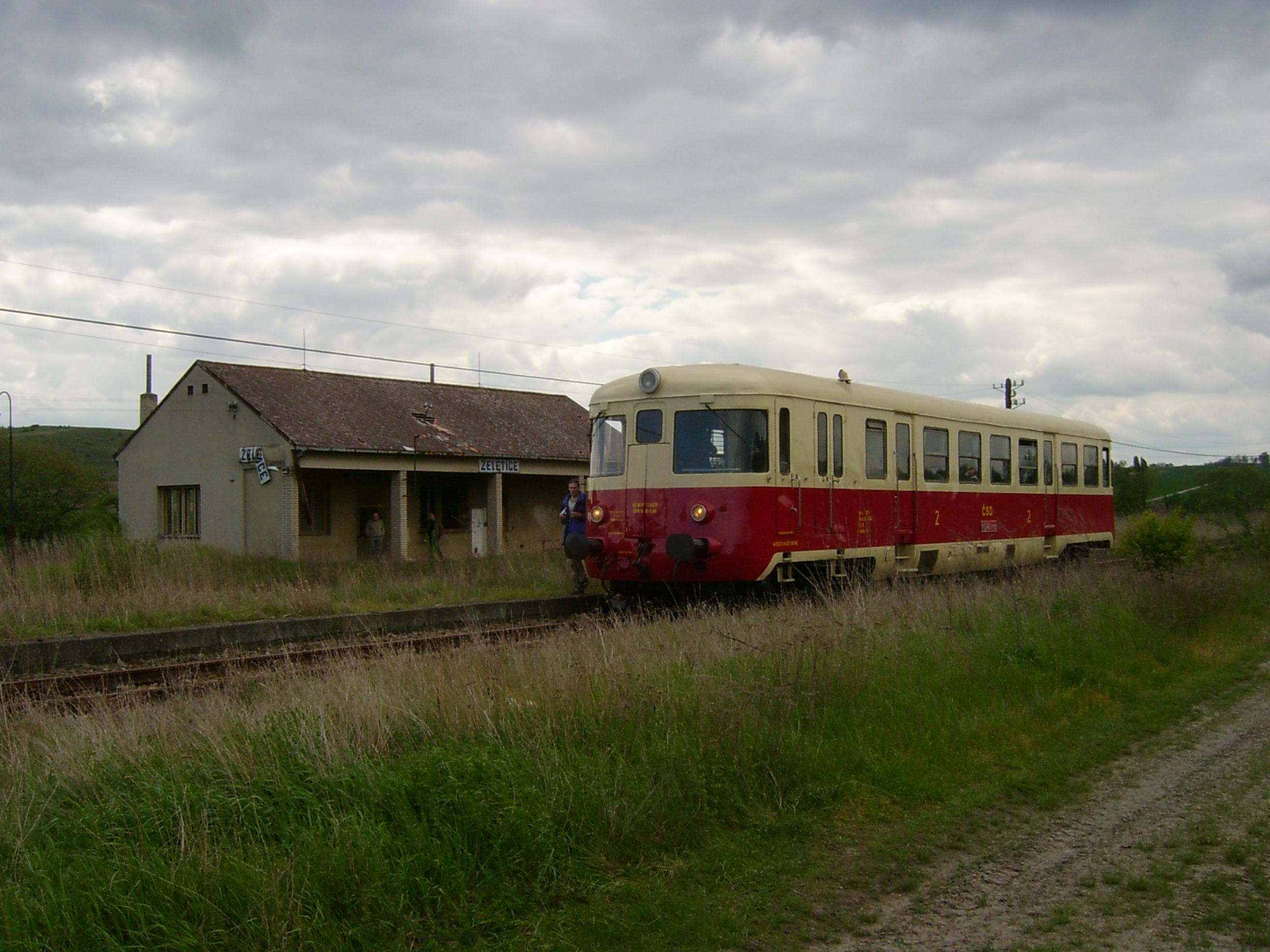
Czech Republic

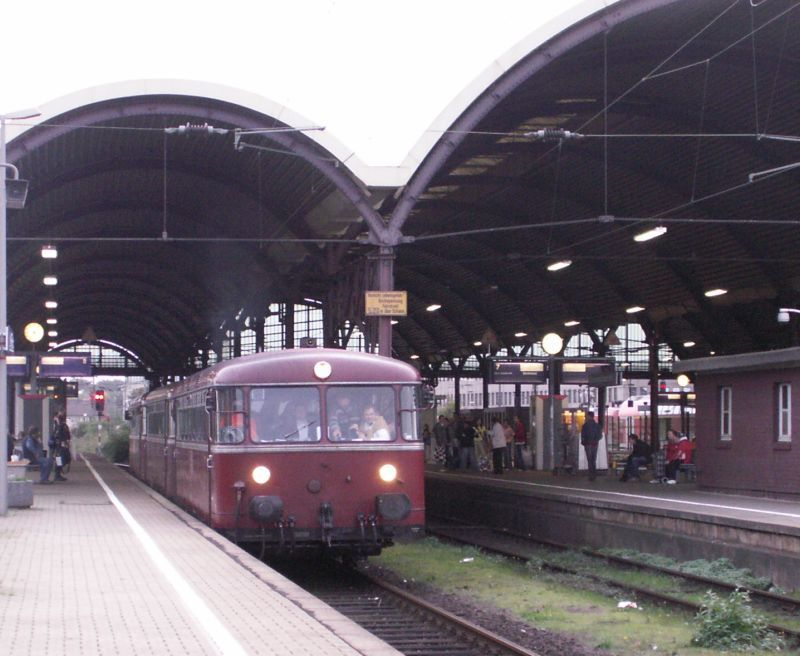
Germany

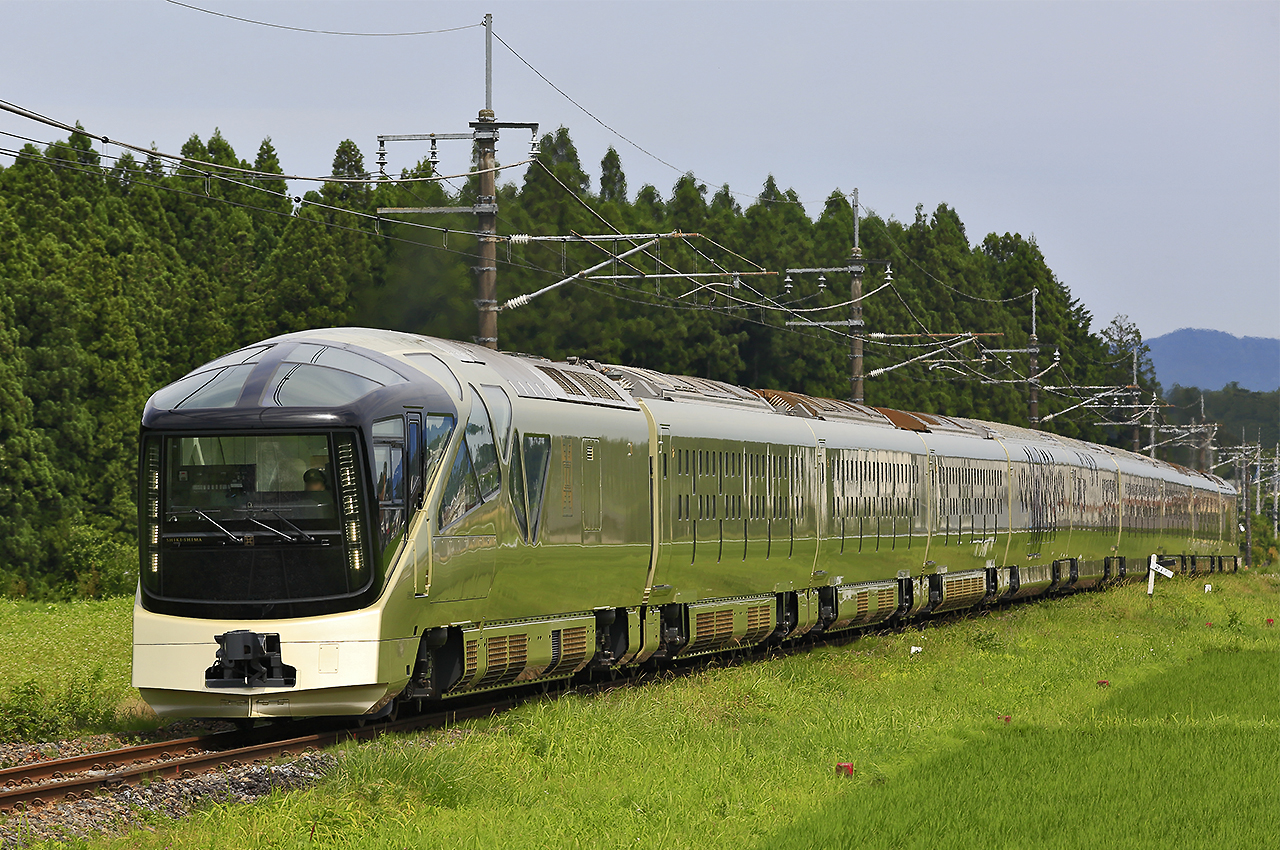
Japan

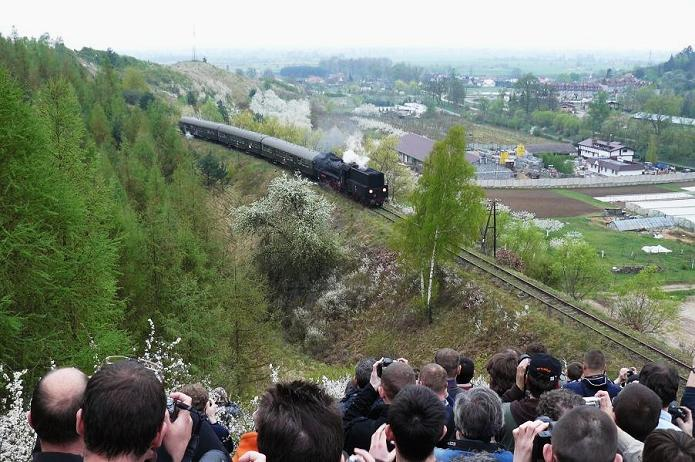
Poland

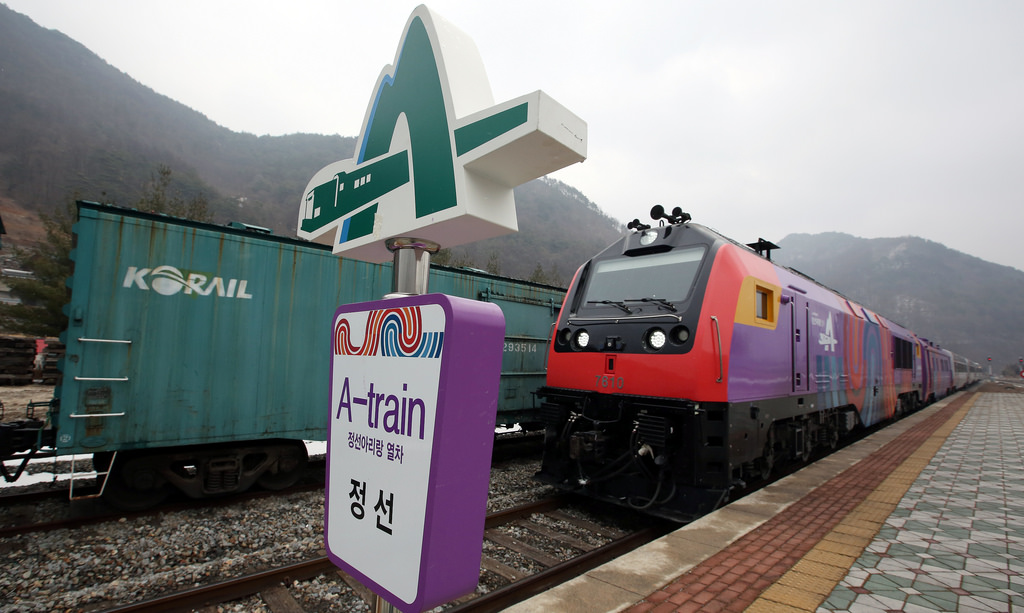
South Korea

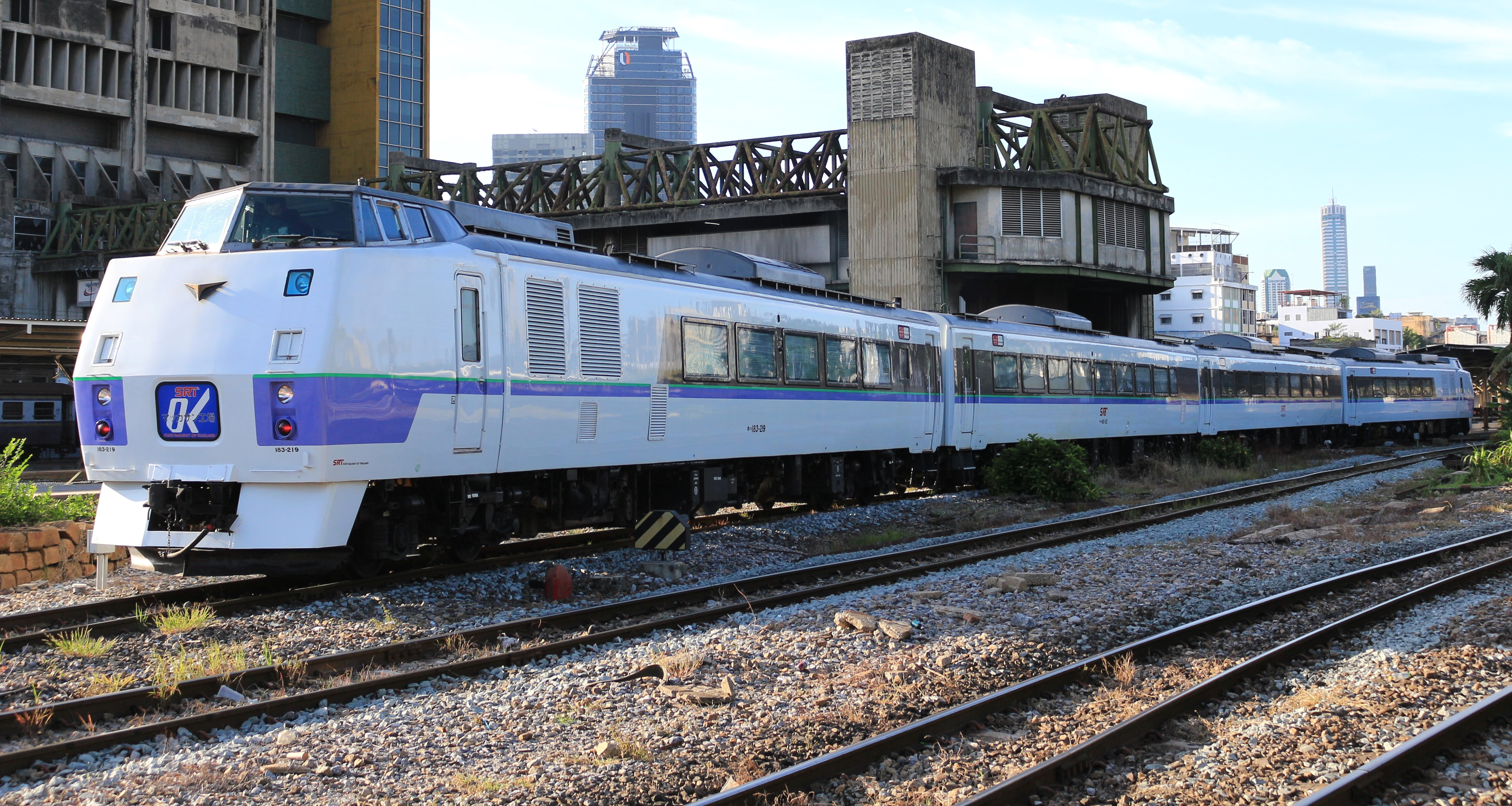
Thailand

== See also ==
- Dinner trains usually operate on a schedule instead of for special events
- List of heritage railways
- Heritage railway
- Joyful Train - Japanese catch-all term for special event and charter trains
- Private railroad car that may be hauled by special arrangements
