= Canadian National 2141 =

Preserved CN M-3-d class 2-8-0 locomotive

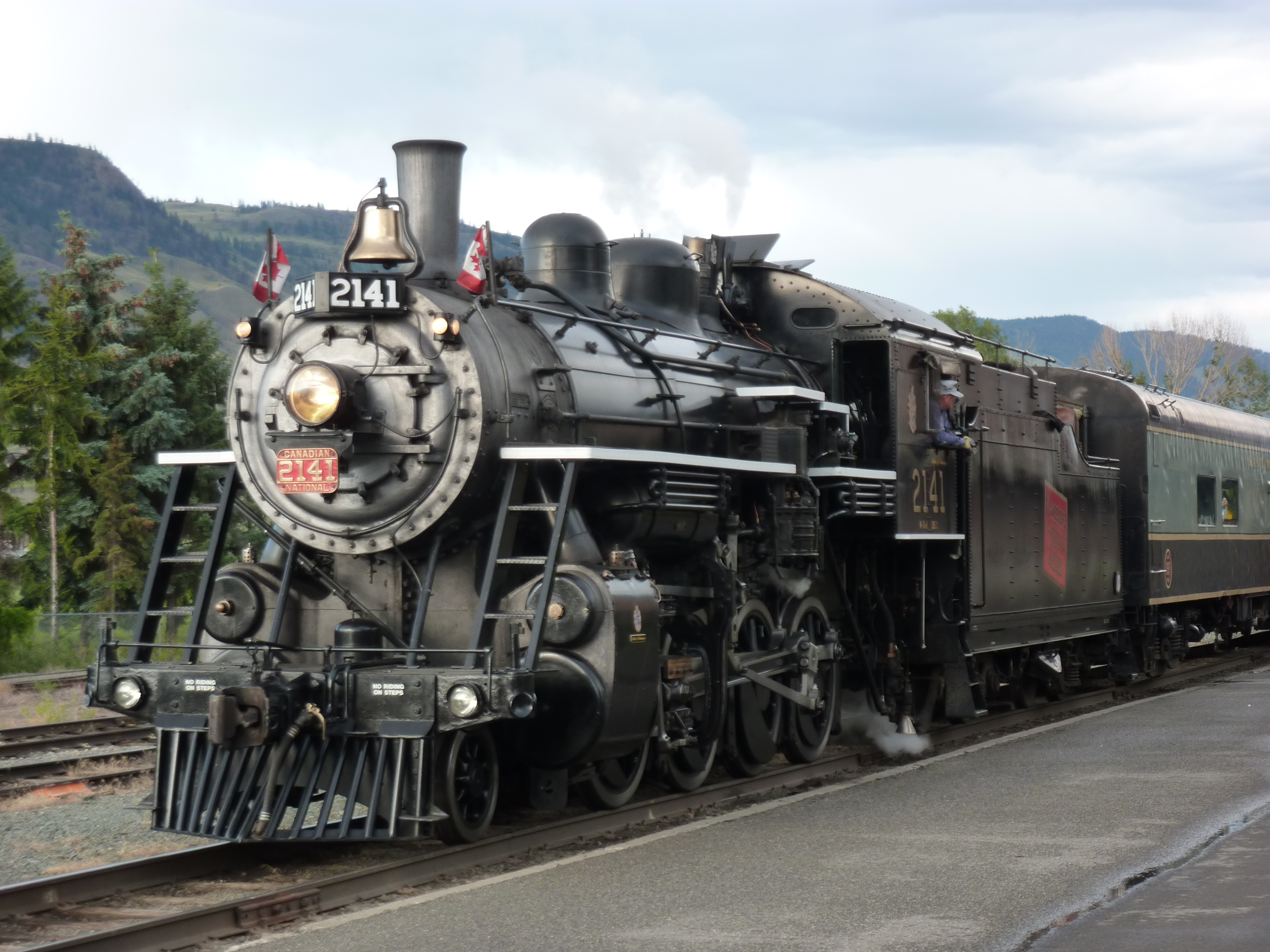
- No. 2141 awaiting to depart with an excursion train, July 11, 2011
Type and origin
- Power type: Steam
- Builder: Canadian Locomotive Company
- Serial number: 1059
- Model: M-3-d
- Build date: April 1912
Specifications
- Configuration
  - Whyte: 2-8-0
- Gauge: 4 ft 8 1/2 in (1,435 mm) standard gauge
- Driver dia.: 57 in (1,400 mm)
- Loco weight: 114,000 lb (52,000 kg)
- Tender weight: 84,000 lb (38,000 kg)
- Total weight: 228,000 lb (103,000 kg)
- Fuel type: New: Coal; Now: Oil
- Fuel capacity: Coal: 10 long tons (10 t); Oil: 3,000 imp gal (14,000 litres; 3,600 US gallons)
- Water cap.: 6,000 imp gal (27,000 litres; 7,200 US gallons)
- Boiler pressure: 180 psi (1.24 MPa)
- Cylinders: Two, outside
- Cylinder size: 23 in × 26 in (584 mm × 660 mm)
- Valve gear: Stephenson
- Valve type: Piston valves
- Loco brake: Air
- Train brakes: Air
- Couplers: Knuckle
Performance figures
- Tractive effort: 35,000 lbf (156 kN)
Career
- Operators: Canadian Northern Railway; Canadian National Railway; Kamloops Heritage Railway
- Class: M-3-d
- Numbers: CNoR 2141; CN 2141; KHRX 2141
- Nicknames: Spirit of Kamloops
- Retired: July 4, 1958
- Preserved: October 29, 1961
- Restored: August 25, 2001
- Current owner: Kamloops Heritage Railway Society
- Disposition: Undergoing major overhaul

Canadian National 2141 is a M-3-d class 2-8-0 "Consolidation" type steam locomotive, built in 1912 by the Canadian Locomotive Company (CLC), in Kingston, Ontario for the Canadian Northern Railway (CNoR), it is preserved and operated by the Kamloops Heritage Railway (KHRX).

== History ==
No. 2141 was built in April 1912 by the Canadian Locomotive Company (CLC), in Kingston, Ontario for the Canadian Northern Railway (CNoR), which later merged into the Canadian National Railway (CN). The locomotive spent many years working on both drag freights and passenger trains throughout Ontario, Montreal and British Columbia for forty-six years. It was originally built as a coal burner, but was later converted to burn oil in 1948.

In 1950, No. 2141 was moved to Vancouver Island to work along sister engine No. 2149, there, it worked hauling logging trains and various other freight trains throughout Youbou, British Columbia, Cowichan Bay, and Victoria, British Columbia for eight years until it was retired from revenue service on July 4, 1958.

It was stored outside of the Point Ellice Roundhouse for three years awaiting to be scrapped, until October 29, 1961, when it was purchased and sold to City of Kamloops mayor Jack Fitzwater for $2,000. No. 2141 was eventually moved to the City of Kamloops and was preserved for static display at Riverside Park, where it remained for the next thirty-three years.

In 1993, the City of Kamloops was approached by a private enterprise group and was asked about the possibility of restoring and operate the engine for tourist operations in Alberta. In February 1994, No. 2141 was removed from display by the newly formed 2141 Steam Locomotive Restoration Society, it was moved into a warehouse located in River Street in Kamloops where restoration work officially began. On July 31, 2001, the Kamloops city council approved $1 million dollars in No. 2141's restoration and loaned $360,183 to the Kamloops Heritage Railway Society to help construct a shop building to house and maintain the locomotive.

On August 24, No. 2141 underwent a successful test fire and the following day, it moved under its own power for the first time in forty-three years. On January 15, 2002 after final assembly and more testing, No. 2141 was moved to its new home in Lorne Street, Kamloops, British Columbia under its own power and now proclaimed as the Spirit of Kamloops, hauled its inaugural run for the Kamloops Heritage Railway (KHRX) on June 26.

On September 27, 2003, Canadian Pacific 2816 visited the KHRX and took part in a doubleheader excursion with No. 2141. On August 1, 2004, No. 2141 veered off the KHRX property and ran a special steam excursion on a 36-mile round trip from Kamloops to Vinsulla, British Columbia and return.

In 2013, No. 2141 was taken out of service to undergo its federally-mandated 1,472-day inspection and overhaul. It returned to service in the summer of 2015.

In 2020, it was taken out of service again and placed in storage inside the KHRX engine house due to the railway suspending operations over the COVID-19 pandemic. This was also due to the increased amount of freight traffic, mainly the export of American coal through Kamloops via Canadian Pacific Railway to the Canadian National Kamloops North yard via the rail bridge over the North Thompson River. It was originally scheduled to return to service in the fall of 2021 for an excursion trip to Armstrong, but those plans fell through and it would remained in storage.

In 2024, a new board of directors for the KHRX was established and began work on rebuilding No. 2141 to operation again, Canadian National has also offered to let KHRX operate the engine on 71 miles of track to the Okanagan Subdivision, between Campbell Creek and Vernon.

On June 3, 2025, No. 2141 emerged from the shops for the first time in six years, running under compressed air. The KHRX plans to have No. 2141 in service again sometime in 2026.

On July 17, 2026, it was announced that No. 2141 completed its hydrostatic testing.

== Apperences in media ==
In 2009, No. 2141 was briefly renumbered as No. 238 and re-modified with a wood-burning smokestack, ornate headlight and a large 1800's style cowcatcher to look like an old western style engine for filming of the television miniseries film Iron Road, starring Sun Li and Luke Macfarlane.
