= Union Pacific 6936 =

Preserved diesel-electric locomotive

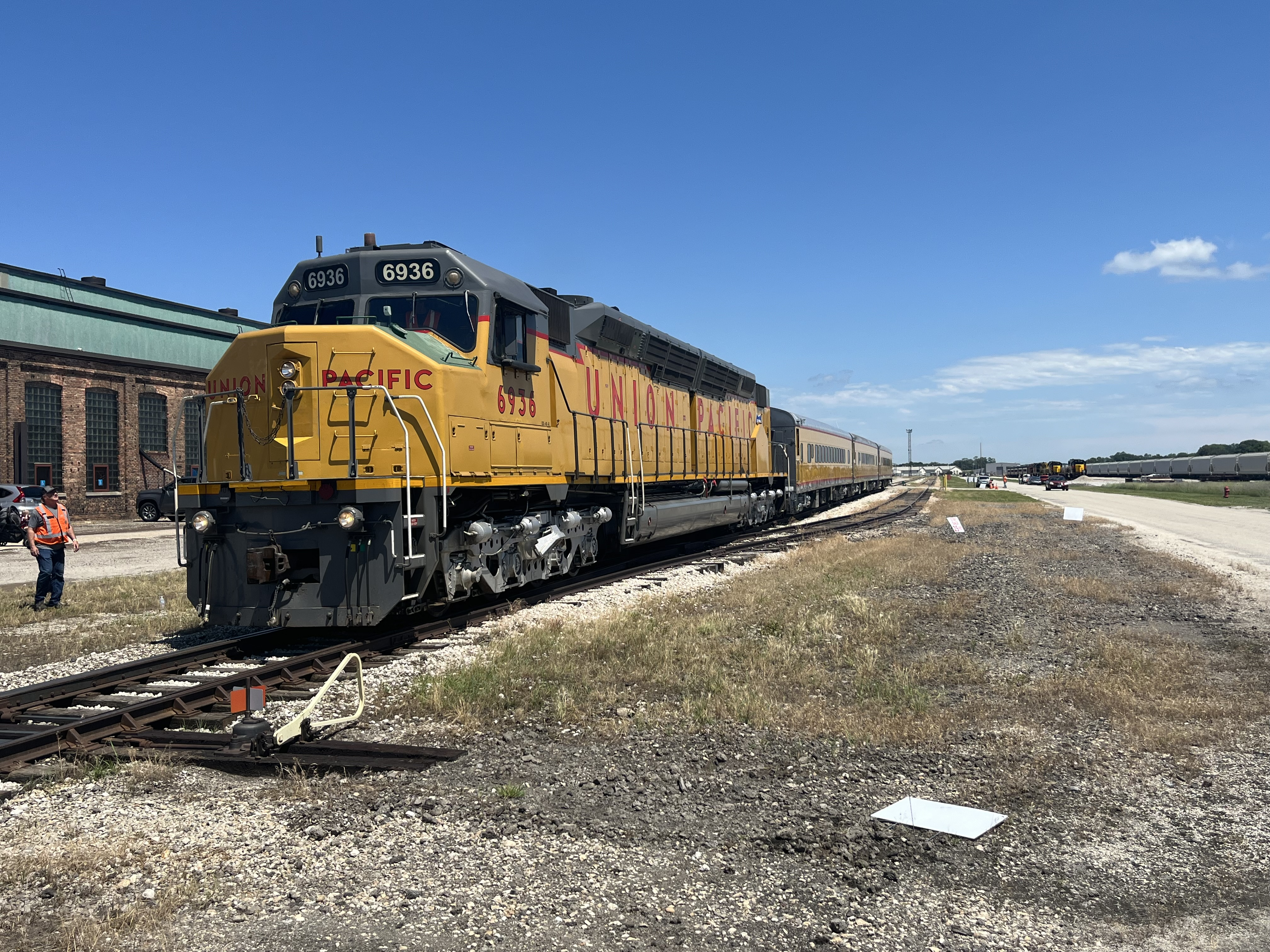
- Union Pacific No. 6936 at the Railroading Heritage of Midwest America in Silvis, Illinois.
Type and origin
- Power type: Diesel-electric
- Builder: EMD
- Model: DDA40X
- Build date: January 1971
Specifications
- Configuration
  - AAR: D-D
  - UIC: Do'Do'
- Gauge: 4 ft 8 1/2 in (1,435 mm) standard gauge
- Safety systems: Leslie S5TRF
Career
- Operators: Union Pacific
- Numbers: 6936
- Nicknames: "Centennial"
- Current owner: Railroading Heritage of Midwest America
- Disposition: Operational

Union Pacific 6936 is an EMD DDA40X locomotive built for the Union Pacific Railroad (UP). Previously a part of UP's heritage fleet, 6936 was for several decades the last remaining operational "Centennial" type, and thus the largest operational diesel-electric locomotive in the world. It is now owned by the Railroading Heritage of Midwest America in Silvis, Illinois, which returned the locomotive to operation.

== History ==
=== Service with Union Pacific ===
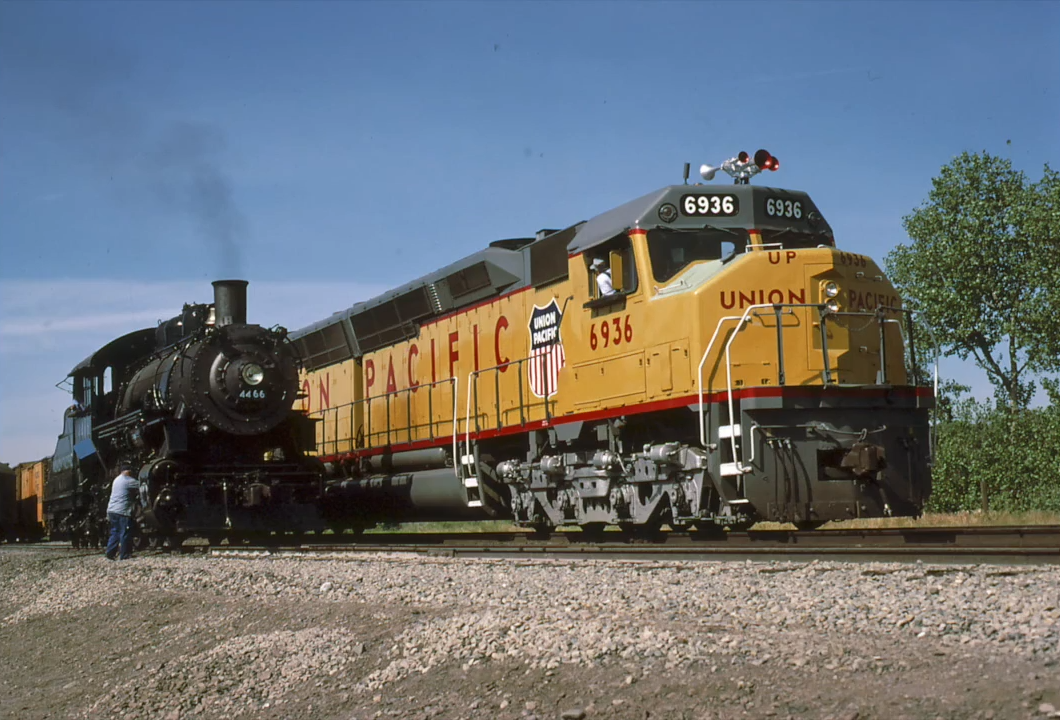
No. 6936 and Union Pacific 4466 at Railfair '91

Built in January 1971, the UP classifies No. 6936 as a DD40X rather than a DDA40X as indicated by the model designation on the cab of the locomotive. It served in revenue service over the next decade and into the mid-1980s across the Union Pacific system. UP 6936 made its last regular freight trip on May 6, 1985. It went on to become a part of the railroad's excursion fleet.

The locomotive participated in its last excursion with UP in 2015, when it helped the UP's trio of EMD E9 units at the annual Cheyenne Frontier Days event. It was last used on July 12, 2016, when it helped to test UP 844, a steam locomotive being returned to service. Its dynamic brakes were used to simulate a load while being pulled. After the tests, it was placed into storage at the roundhouse in Cheyenne.

==== Accident ====
On November 30, 2000, the DDA40X collided with a dump truck at a grade crossing in Livonia, Louisiana. The accident killed a railroad employee riding on the nose section and the driver of the dump truck. The unit was stored in North Little Rock, Arkansas, until damage to its nose could be repaired. The repair was done by May 2, 2001.

=== Acquisition by RRHMA ===
In April 2022, Union Pacific announced that 6936—along with Union Pacific 3985, Union Pacific 5511, and several other pieces of equipment stored at the Cheyenne roundhouse—were to be donated to the Railroading Heritage of Midwest America, with plans to return the locomotive to operation. In November of that same year, UP moved 6936 and the rest of the donated equipment to the RRHMA's large shop facility in Silvis, Illinois. After undergoing inspection and repairs, 6936 made a successful test run on August 19, 2023. In 2025, #6936 hauled two fundraising trips on September 20 and 21, to South Amana, Iowa and Bureau Junction, Illinois respectively, making its first public main line excursions in a decade.
