= Kamloops Heritage Railway =

Railway in Kamloops, British Columbia, Canada

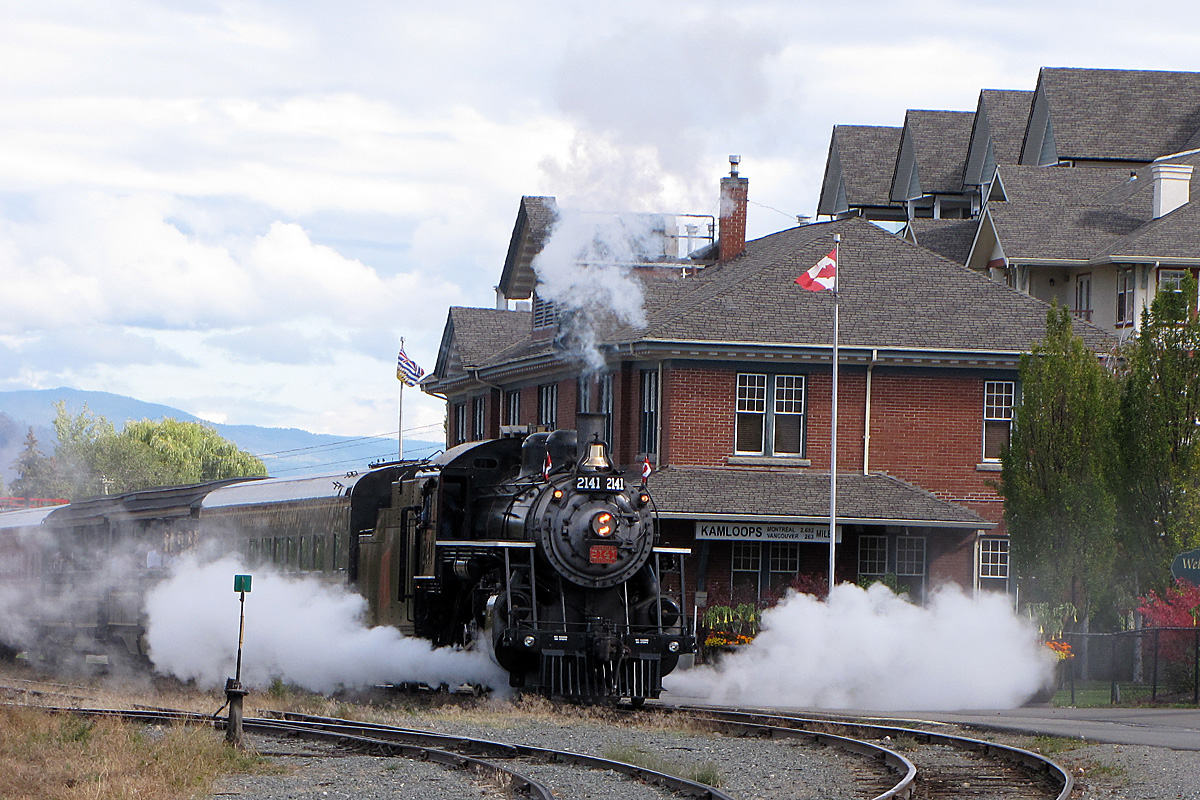
- No. 2141 departing from Kamloops station, September 20, 2010
- Locale: British Columbia
- Terminus: Kamloops
- Coordinates: 50.6787°N 120.3297°W

Commercial operations
- Built by: Canadian National Railway
- Original gauge: 4 ft 8 1/2 in (1,435 mm)

Preserved operations
- Owned by: City of Kamloops
- Operated by: Kamloops Heritage Railway Society
- Reporting mark: KHRX
- Stations: 1
- Length: 6 mi (9.7 km)
- Preserved gauge: 4 ft 8 1/2 in (1,435 mm)

Commercial history
- Opened: (?)
- Closed: (?)

Preservation history
- 1993: The City of Kamloops is approached by a private group about restoring and operating No. 2141
- February 1994: 2141 Steam Locomotive Restoration Society is organized
- August 25, 2001: Restoration of the No. 2141 is completed
- January 15, 2002: No. 2141 is moved to its new location
- June 26, 2002: Tourist operations begin
- 2020: Tourist operations suspended
- Headquarters: Kamloops, British Columbia

Website
- www.kamrail.com

The Kamloops Heritage Railway (reporting mark KHRX) is a heritage railway in Kamloops, British Columbia. The railway operates from May to December; trains are hauled by 2-8-0 steam locomotive Canadian National Railway No. 2141, also known as the Spirit of Kamloops. The museum's operations are currently suspended, initially due to the COVID-19 pandemic, but it plans to resume operations in 2026.

== History ==
The Kamloops Heritage Railway began in 1993, when the City of Kamloops was approached by a private enterprise group, who asked about the possibility of restoring and operating Canadian National 2141 to run tourist trains in Alberta.

In February 1994, No. 2141 was removed from display by the newly formed 2141 Steam Locomotive Restoration Society and moved into a warehouse in River Street in Kamloops, where restoration work officially began. On July 31, 2001, the Kamloops city council approved $1 million for No. 2141's restoration, and loaned $360,183 to help the Kamloops Heritage Railway Society construct a workshop building in Lorne Street to house and maintain the locomotive.

On August 24, 2001, No. 2141 underwent a successful test fire, and it moved under steam for the first time in 43 years the following day. On January 15, 2002, after some final assembly and more testing, No. 2141 was moved to its new location under its own power. Five months later, now proclaimed as Spirit of Kamloops, it hauled the railroad's inaugural excursion on June 26.

The train travels on a 6-mile round trip from downtown Kamloops to CN Rail Cam Loops Junction from May to December each year. The train would occasionally run a 112.8-mile round trip to Armstrong for the special "Armstrong Explorer" excursion; tickets for excursions are sold at the ticket office, located at No. 3-510 Lorne Street, right across from the old Kamloops railway station.

In 2020, it was announced that the railroad would suspend operations due to the COVID-19 pandemic. This was also due to the increased amount of freight traffic, mainly the export of American coal through Kamloops via the Canadian Pacific Railway to the Canadian National Kamloops North yard via the rail bridge over the North Thompson River.

In 2024, A new board of directors was established and made plans to return No. 2141 to operational service by 2026, with Canadian National offering to let the heritage railway operate on 71 miles of the Okanagan Subdivision, between Campbell Creek and Vernon. A boiler inspector surveyed the locomotive and stated that little work has to be done to restore it to operational use.

On July 17, 2026, it was announced that No. 2141 completed its hydrostatic test.

== Equipment ==
=== Locomotives ===
Locomotive details
Number	Image	Type	Model	Built	Builder	Status
2141		Steam	2-8-0	1912	Montreal Locomotive Works	Undergoing major overhaul

=== Rolling stock ===
Rolling stock details
Number / Name	Image	Type	Built	Builder
402 (Monte Lake)		Cafe Lounge car	1954	Unknown
403 (Riverside Park)		Passenger car	1954	Unknown
406 (Georgia Bay)		Parlour solarium	1930	Canadian Car and Foundry
501 (Westwood)		Caboose	1975	Unknown

=== Former rolling stock ===
Rolling stock details
Number / Name	Image	Type	Built	Builder	Owner
405 (Brookmere)		Passenger car	1954	Canadian Car and Foundry	Kettle Valley Steam Railway

== See also ==
- List of heritage railways in Canada
