= Union Pacific 5511 =

Preserved American 2-10-2 steam locomotive

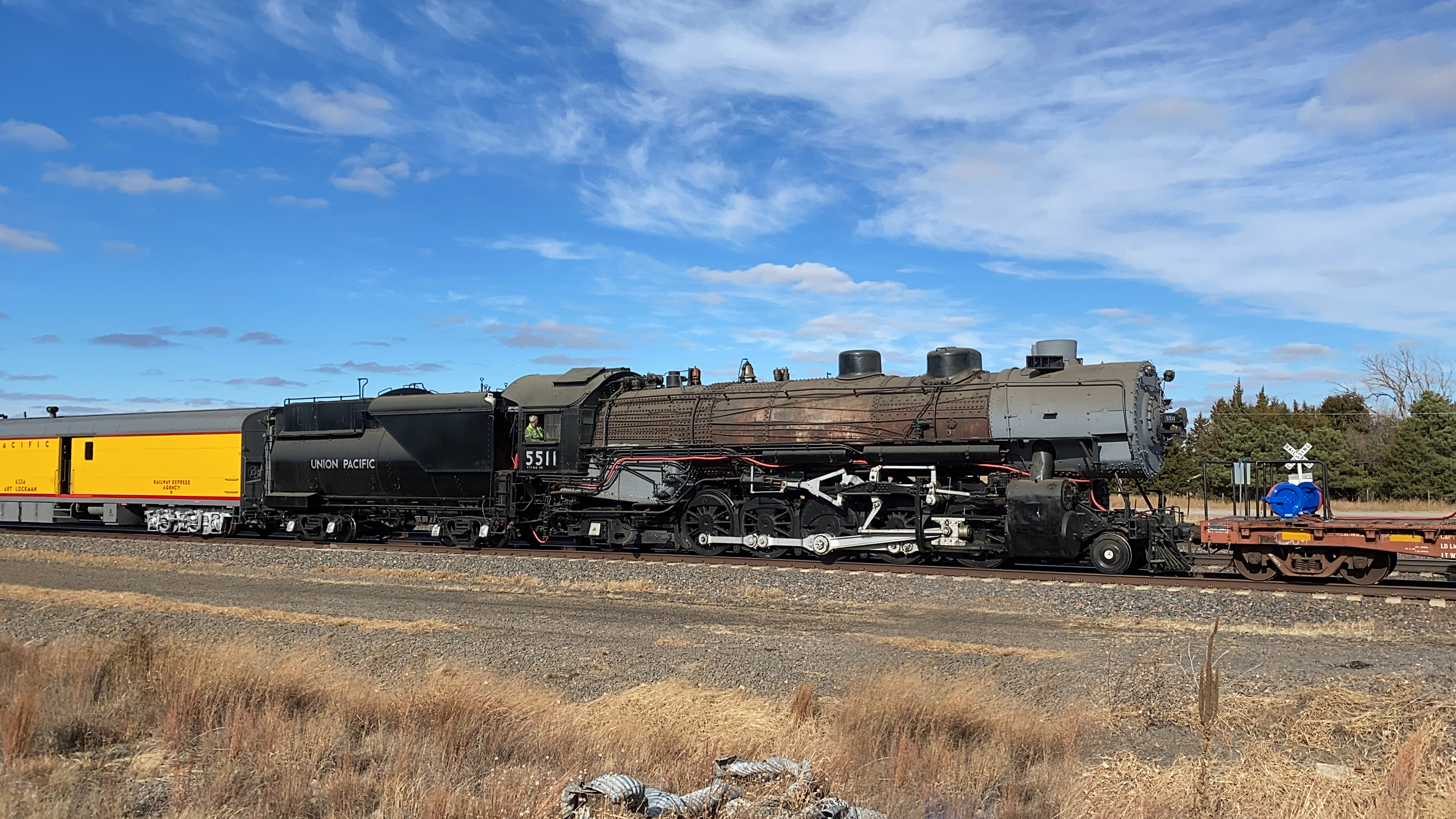
- No. 5511 in Brady, Nebraska, being towed to Silvis, Illinois, in November 2022
Type and origin
- Power type: Steam
- Builder: Baldwin Locomotive Works
- Serial number: 56999
- Build date: September 1923
Specifications
- Configuration
  - Whyte: 2-10-2
  - UIC: 1'E1
- Driver dia.: 63 in (1,600 mm)
- Wheelbase: 79.37 ft (24.19 m)
  - Engine: 41.42 ft (12.62 m)
  - Drivers: 22.50 ft (6.86 m)
- Axle load: 58,000 lb (26,000 kg)
- Adhesive weight: 288,700 lb (131,000 kg)
- Loco weight: 362,200 lb (164,300 kg)
- Tender weight: 231,000 lb (105,000 kg)
- Total weight: 539,200 lb (244,600 kg)
- Fuel type: Oil
- Fuel capacity: 5,200 US gal (20,000 L; 4,300 imp gal)
- Water cap.: 12,000 US gal (45,000 L; 10,000 imp gal)
- Firebox
  - Grate area: 84 sq ft (7.8 m^{2})
- Boiler pressure: 200 psi (1,400 kPa)
- Feedwater heater: Coffin C-87
- Heating surface
  - Firebox: 341 sq ft (31.7 m^{2})
- Cylinders: Two, outside
- Cylinder size: 29.5 in × 30 in (750 mm × 760 mm)
- Valve gear: Young
- Valve type: Piston valves
- Loco brake: Air
- Train brakes: Air
- Couplers: Knuckle
Performance figures
- Maximum speed: 45 mph (72 km/h)
- Tractive effort: 70,449 lb (31,955 kg)
- Factor of adh.: 4.10
Career
- Operators: Union Pacific Railroad
- Class: TTT-6
- Number in class: 12 of 25
- Numbers: UP 5511
- Retired: 1956
- Preserved: November 2022
- Current owner: Railroading Heritage of Midwest America
- Disposition: Undergoing restoration to operating condition

Union Pacific 5511 is a 2-10-2 "Santa Fe"-type steam locomotive built by the Baldwin Locomotive Works (BLW) in September 1923 as part of the Union Pacific Railroad's TTT-6 class. No. 5511 is the last surviving 2-10-2 of 144 operated by the UP from 1917 to the end of steam in 1959, and the only complete UP steam locomotive equipped with Young valve gear.

No. 5511 ran in revenue service until being withdrawn in 1956. Afterwards, it remained in storage in the UP's roundhouse in Cheyenne, Wyoming. In 2022, Union Pacific donated the locomotive to the Railroad Heritage of Midwest America (RRHMA) in Silvis, Illinois. As of 2026, RRHMA is working to restore No. 5511, along with Challenger No. 3985, to operating condition.

== History ==
=== Revenue service ===
Between 1917 and 1924, the Union Pacific Railroad was facing new operational challenges. As freight traffic increased and the railroad expanded across the rugged terrain of the American West, especially through the Wasatch Mountain and Sherman Hill, UP needed more powerful locomotives to handle long, heavy trains over steep grades. By the 1910s, the Mallet compound articulateds were powerful but complex, and the traditional 2-8-0 “Consolidation” types were becoming outdated. UP engineers, working with the Baldwin Locomotive Works, began looking for a solution that could provide strong tractive effort, reliable performance, and a simpler mechanical layout. Union Pacific purchased 144 2-10-2 locomotives, divided into classes TTT-1 through -7. (While other railroads called this wheel arrangement the “Santa Fe” type, Union Pacific simply categorized it by its wheel configuration—2-10-2—and class.) American Locomotive Company (ALCO) built 18; Baldwin Locomotive Works, 88; and Lima Locomotive Works, 37. All UP 2-10-2s had the same cylinder dimensions, driving wheel diameter, and boiler pressure.

As rail traffic increased, these locomotives became workhorses for UP’s freight division. No. 5511 was the twelfth of 25 TTT-6s built in 1923. It was initially assigned to pull heavy freight trains over the steep grades of the Wasatch Mountain Range between Ogden, Utah, and Green River, Wyoming. With the introduction of the 4-6-6-4 "Challengers", which could climb steep grades better than the 2-10-2s, No. 5511 was reassigned to pull long freight trains across the Great Plains in Wyoming, Nebraska, and Iowa. Sometimes, the locomotive would help push freight trains up Sherman Hill.

By the end of 1956, No. 5511 was removed from the UP's active list. It was later used as a stationary boiler in Ogden and then Green River. In December 1958, No. 5511 was filmed for Last of the Giants, a UP film that largely focused on the railroad's 4-8-8-4 "Big Boys". To make No. 5511 appear operational, the filmmakers coupled it to a string of freight cars, burned tires in its smokebox, and used an EMD diesel locomotive to push the whole consist. After filming, the locomotive was sent to Cheyenne, where its piston rods were cut and it was to be scrapped with the rest of its class members. An unknown employee ordered the locomotive to be held for preservation due to its movie appearance. As a result, the locomotive was moved from Green River to Cheyenne and stored in the UP's roundhouse.

=== Preservation ===
By the end of the 1960s, No. 5511 became the only 2-10-2 locomotive from the UP to be preserved. The locomotive was repainted for a cleaner appearance and stored inside the UP's Cheyenne Roundhouse for the next six decades. During that time, the locomotive was repainted and moved onto a turntable to be displayed for a National Railway Historical Society (NRHS) convention. The locomotive was then stored without boiler jacketing.

=== Restoration ===
In April 2022, the UP announced that it would donate to the Railroading Heritage of Midwest America (RRHMA) No. 5511, three other locomotives, and several other pieces of rolling stock from the heritage fleet, including 4-6-6-4 No. 3985, EMD DDA40X "Centennial" No. 6936, and an EMD E9 B unit. On May 13, 2022, RRHMA launched a fundraiser to raise money to restore 5511 and 3985 to operation. On September 14, 2022, No. 5511 was moved from the Cheyenne roundhouse for the first time since 1970 and around the yard for testing behind Big Boy No. 4014. That November, UP moved No. 5511 and the rest of the donated equipment to the RRHMA's shop in Silvis, Illinois.

The restoration of No. 5511, along with No. 3985, began in late January 2023. In March, the superheaters and dome cover were removed. The boiler flues were removed around April so the boiler could be cleaned and prepared for inspection. In July, the fire brick was removed so the firebox could be inspected, while the safety valves and dynamo were removed to be rebuilt.

On September 8, 2026, No. 5511's boiler was pressurized for the first time since 1958, and it passed an FRA-witnessed hydrostatic test. On November 6, the locomotive was test-fired outside the RRHMA's shops, the first time it was under steam since 1956. Restoration work is expected to be completed by mid 2027.

== See also ==
- Southern Pacific 975
- Southern Pacific 5021
