= Pennsylvania Railroad 1361 =

Preserved PRR K4s class 4-6-2 steam locomotive

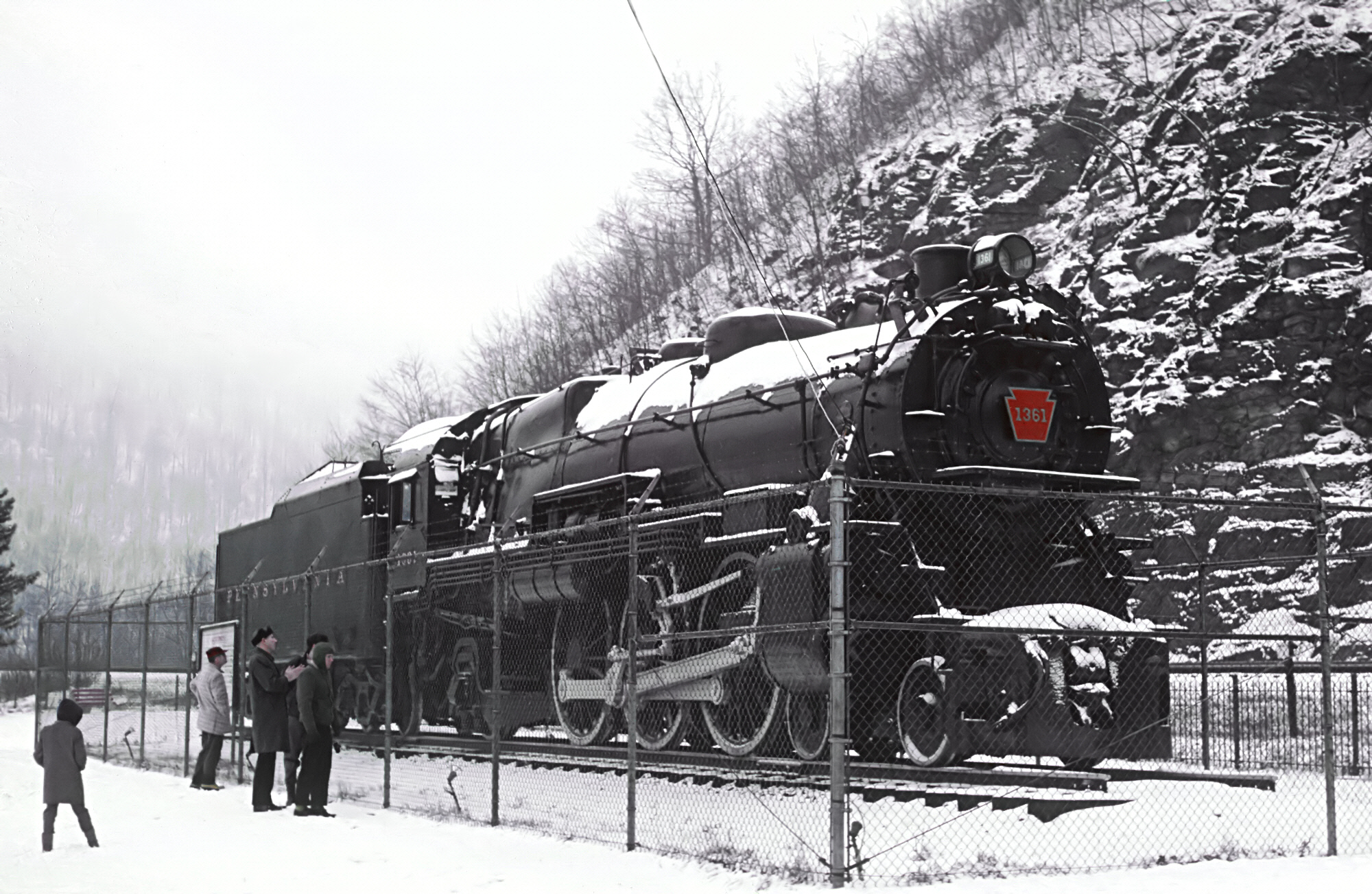
- PRR No. 1361 on display at the Horseshoe Curve on February 23, 1969
Type and origin
- Power type: Steam
- Designer: James T. Wallis; Alfred W. Gibbs; Axel Vogt
- Builder: Juniata Shops
- Serial number: 3475
- Build date: May 1918
Specifications
- Configuration
  - Whyte: 4-6-2
- Gauge: 4 ft 8 1/2 in (1,435 mm)
- Leading dia.: 36 in (914 mm)
- Driver dia.: 80 in (2,032 mm)
- Trailing dia.: 50 in (1,270 mm)
- Wheelbase: 13 ft 10 in (4.2 m) between driving axles
- Length: 83 ft 6 in (25.5 m)
- Axle load: 66,500 lb (30,200 kg; 30.2 t)
- Adhesive weight: 199,500 lb (90,500 kg; 90.5 t)
- Loco weight: 304,500 lb (138,100 kg; 138.1 t)
- Tender weight: 212,725 lb (96,490 kg; 96.490 t)
- Total weight: 517,225 lb (234,609 kg; 234.609 t)
- Tender type: 130-P-75
- Fuel type: Coal
- Fuel capacity: 22 tonnes (49,000 lb)
- Water cap.: 13,475 US gallons (51,010 L)
- Firebox
  - Type: Belpaire
  - Grate area: 69.89 sq ft (6.49 m^{2})
- Boiler: 78 1/2 in (1,994 mm)
- Boiler pressure: 205 psi (1,413 kPa)
- Heating surface: 4,041 square feet (375 m^{2})
- Cylinders: Two, outside
- Cylinder size: 27 in × 28 in (686 mm × 711 mm)
- Valve gear: Walschaert
- Valve type: Piston valves
- Loco brake: Air
- Train brakes: Air
- Couplers: Knuckle
Performance figures
- Tractive effort: 44,460 lbf (197.77 kN)
- Factor of adh.: 4.54
Career
- Operators: Pennsylvania Railroad; Railroaders Memorial Museum
- Class: K4
- Numbers: PRR 1361
- Nicknames: The Juniata Jewel; The Spirit of Altoona
- Delivered: May 18, 1918
- Retired: September 1956 (revenue service); August 1988 (1st excursion service)
- Preserved: June 8, 1957
- Restored: April 12, 1987 (1st excursion service)
- Current owner: Railroaders Memorial Museum
- Disposition: Undergoing restoration to operating condition

Pennsylvania Railroad 1361 is a K4s class 4-6-2 "Pacific" type steam locomotive built in May 1918 by the Pennsylvania Railroad's (PRR) Juniata Shops in Altoona, Pennsylvania, United States. It hauled mainline passenger trains in Pennsylvania and commuter trains in the northern New Jersey Shore on the PRR until its retirement from revenue service in 1956. Afterwards, in 1957, it was refurbished and put on static display next to the PRR's famous Horseshoe Curve in Blair County, Pennsylvania.

Restored to operating condition for excursion service in 1987, No. 1361 and its other surviving fellow K4s locomotive, No. 3750, were designated as the official state steam locomotives by the Pennsylvania General Assembly. In late 1988, it was sidelined due to mechanical problems and a second restoration attempt stalled. As of 2026 the locomotive is owned by the Railroaders Memorial Museum (RMM) in Altoona, Pennsylvania, where it is being restored.

== History ==
=== Design changes, revenue service, and retirement as a display ===
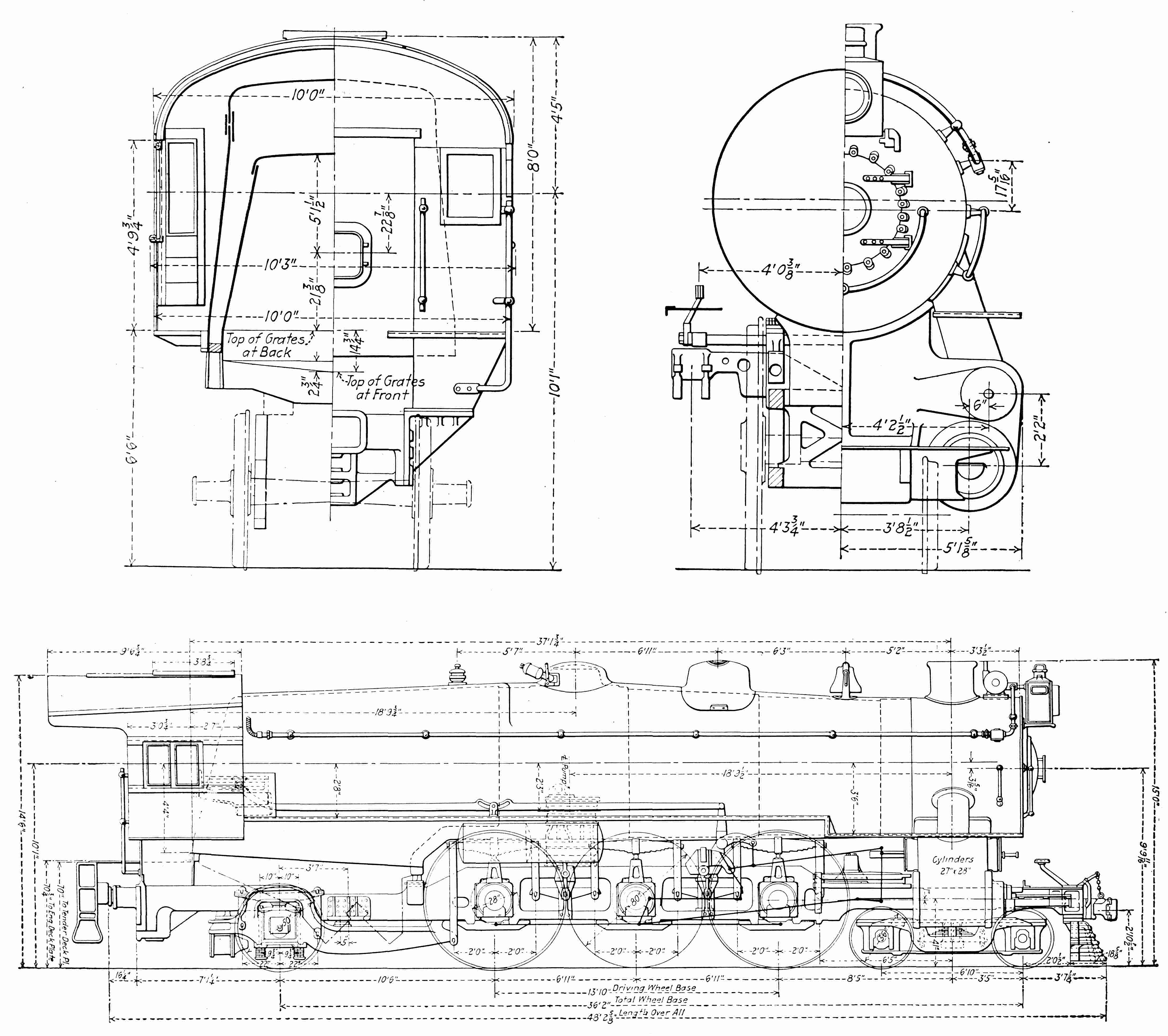
A drawing design of the PRR K4s class locomotive

No. 1361 was one of 425 K4s class steam locomotives built between 1914 and 1928 for the Pennsylvania Railroad (PRR) as their primary mainline passenger locomotive. Built in May 1918 at PRR's Juniata Shops in Altoona, Pennsylvania, No. 1361 was assigned to haul PRR's Blue Ribbon passenger train fleet, including the Broadway Limited, between New York City and Pittsburgh, Pennsylvania, via the PRR mainline. Additionally, it and the other K4s were capable of pulling 10 passenger cars around PRR's famous Horseshoe Curve and going at 100 mph (161 km/h) on flat terrains. As initially built, No. 1361 was originally equipped with a square-shaped oil headlight, a round number plate, a screw reverser, a long wooden pilot, and a 70-P-75 type tender, which held 7,000 US gallons (26,000 L) of water and 12.5 tonnes (28,000 lb) of coal. During the 1920s, No. 1361 was re-equipped with a cylindrical-shaped electric headlight, a steel bar pilot, a power reverser, a keystone shaped number plate, and a 90-P-75 type tender, which held 9,700 US gallons (37,000 L) of water and 21 tonnes (46,000 lb) of coal.

By the mid-1930s, PRR's passenger trains grew longer and heavier, which led to No. 1361 and the other K4s required to double head and even triple head each other. At the same time, when PRR's Eastern Region line between New York and Harrisburg, Pennsylvania was electrified, No. 1361 was relocated to the Central Division, running from Pittsburgh further west to Chicago, Illinois; Cincinnati, Ohio; and St. Louis, Missouri. Additionally, the No. 1361 locomotive was re-equipped with a 110-P-75 type tender, which held 11,980 US gallons (45,300 L) of water and 18.5 tonnes (41,000 lb) of coal along with a mechanical stoker made to increase the locomotive's performance.

After the end of World War II in 1945, No. 1361 was re-equipped with a cast steel pilot and a vertically retractable coupler while its headlight and dynamo's positions were switched from the front and top of the smokebox. Additionally, a platform stand was added to the bottom front of No. 1361's smokebox for the maintenance crew to attend and inspect its headlight and dynamo. In the early 1950s, No. 1361 was relocated to the northern New Jersey Shore to haul commuter trains between Perth Amboy and Bay Head, New Jersey on the New York and Long Branch line. During that time, No. 1361 swapped out its original 110-P-75 tender with a 130-P-75 type, which held 13,475 US gallons (51,010 L) of water and 22 tonnes (49,000 lb) of coal.

In September 1956, No. 1361 was retired from the PRR and was cosmetically refurbished to be on display next to the Horseshoe Curve, where it was dedicated on June 8, 1957. It had traveled over 2,469,000 miles (3,973,000 km) during its revenue service. For three decades, No. 1361 sat on display outside exposed to the elements, so the members of the Horseshoe Curve Chapter of the National Railway Historical Society (NRHS) were volunteered to repaint and maintain the locomotive.

=== Brief excursion service ===
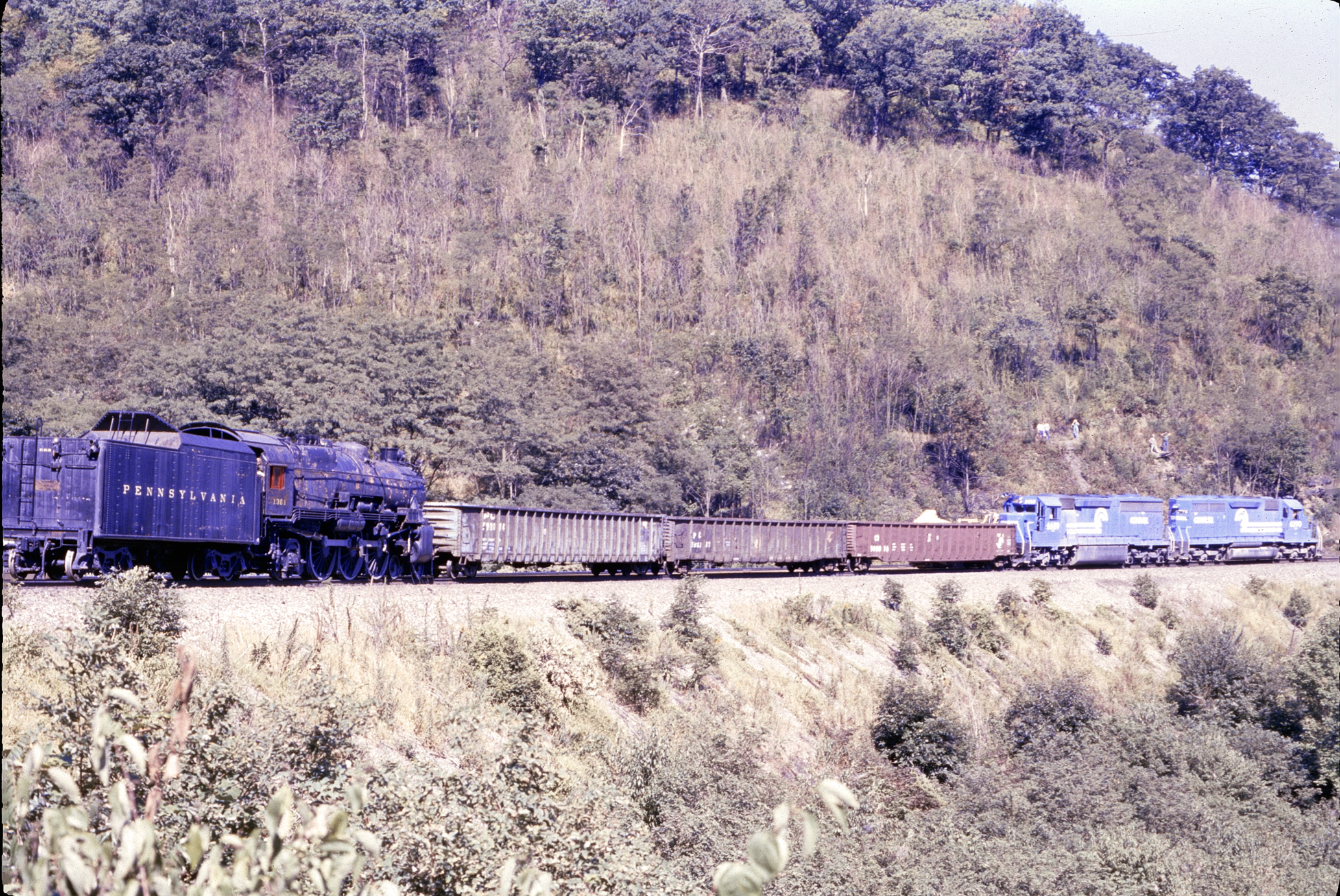
No. 1361 being transferred from Horseshoe Curve on September 16, 1985

On September 16, 1985, PRR's successor Conrail and Assemblyman Richard Geist removed No. 1361 from its display site and moved it to the Railroaders Memorial Museum (RMM) in Altoona for its fifth anniversary. There were originally plans to have the locomotive cosmetically restored again, but the RMM sought to restore it to operating condition for excursion service. In May 1986, No. 1361 was moved to Conrail's ex-PRR Altoona Car Shop, which was the closest facility to the RMM and had the most required equipment made to disassemble the locomotive for restoration. No. 1361's former display location at the Horseshoe Curve was taken over by an EMD GP9 diesel locomotive No. 7048, painted in PRR livery. The restoration work of No. 1361 was performed by Doyle McCormack and his team, who were responsible for restoring Southern Pacific (SP) 4-8-4 No. 4449 in the 1970s.

On April 12, 1987, the locomotive moved under its own power for the first time in 31 years and made its first excursion run from Altoona to Bellefonte, Pennsylvania. It also ran excursion trains on the Nittany and Bald Eagle Railroad and Northern Central Railway. On December 18, 1987, the Pennsylvania General Assembly designated Nos. 1361 and 3750 as the official state steam locomotives; the same bill designated the GG1 No. 4859 as the state electric locomotive. In August 1988, No. 1361 pulled an excursion on the Conrail mainline from Altoona to York, Pennsylvania, but during the return run, the locomotive suffered a catastrophic failure of its main bearing and drive axle near Lewistown. This sidelined No. 1361 indefinitely.

=== Second restoration attempt ===
In preparation for its second restoration, No. 1361's boiler shell passed an ultrasound test, but the backhead was discovered to need more repairs, so the whole locomotive was disassembled inside Conrail's Altoona Car Shop. The RMM then planned to sell No. 1361 to a Keystone Restoration and Preservation, Inc., a new group that would operate No. 1361 and raise funds for it, while the museum would retain the rights to display the locomotive on their property.

But in 1992, the National Park Service awarded the RMM a $900,000 federal grant, which included a $420,000 grant from the Southwestern Pennsylvania Heritage Preservation Commission, and the RMM quickly prioritized the grant for No. 1361's rebuild. The RMM forged a new plan for the restoration, via a partnership with Steamtown and the University of Scranton. In 1996, the locomotive was moved to the Steamtown National Historic Site in Scranton, Pennsylvania, for its rebuild.

The restoration work progressed slowly, since some original parts needed to be replaced with fabricated duplicates. Scheduled completion dates were repeatedly pushed back, and the restoration work was eventually re-estimated to cost $1.7 million to complete. In 2008, the RMM cancelled the effort to rebuild No. 1361 at Steamtown facilities, stopped paying out funds, and began planning to return the locomotive and its parts to Altoona. In 2010, most of No. 1361's parts, including the cab, driving wheels, frame, and tender, returned to the RMM, but the boiler and some other parts were stored at the East Broad Top Railroad shops in Orbisonia, Pennsylvania. In 2015, the museum completed the construction of its Harry Bennett Memorial Roundhouse to store No. 1361's boiler, tender, frame, and other components.

=== Third restoration ===
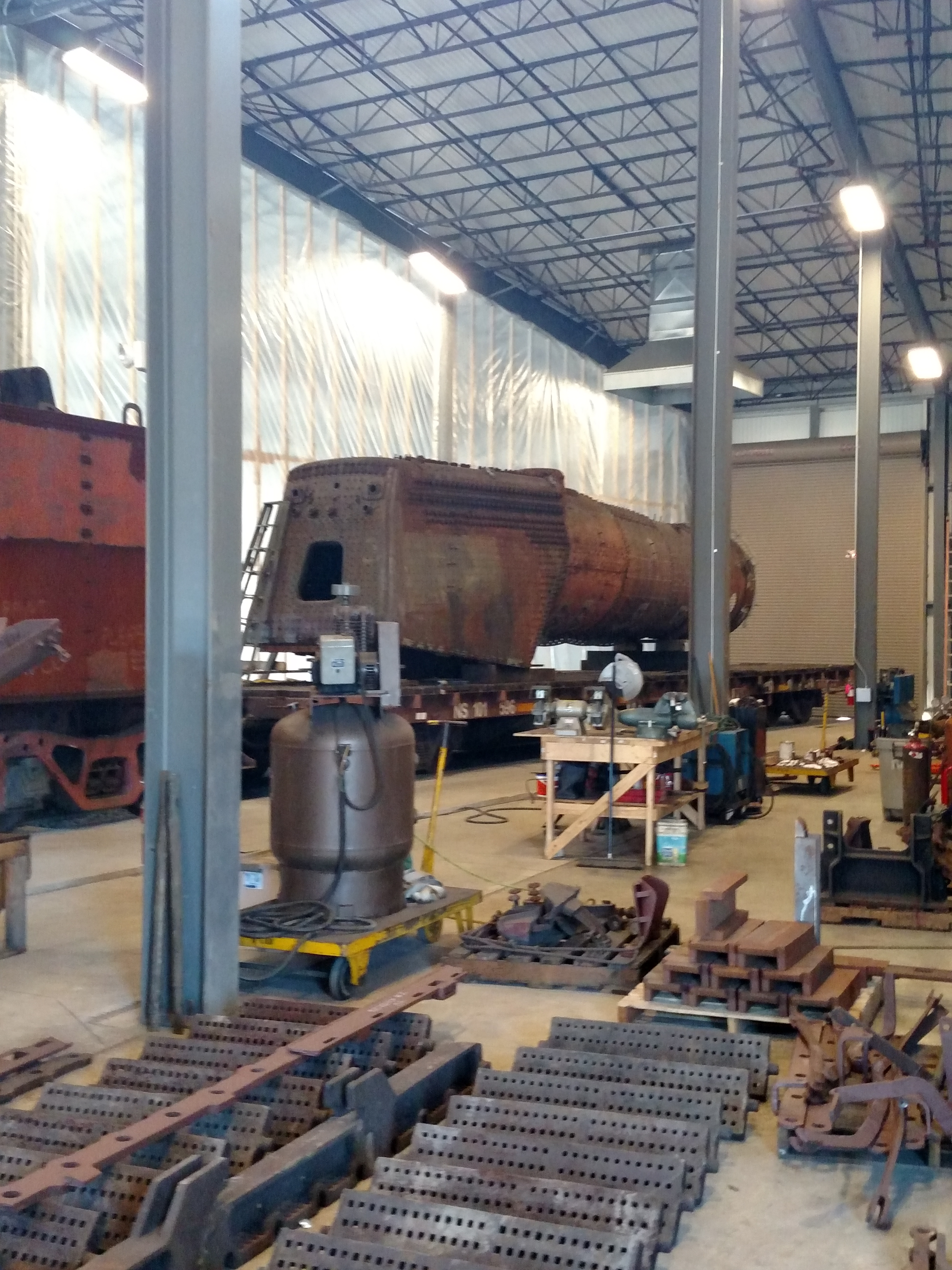
No. 1361 disassembled at the Railroaders Memorial Museum in late 2015

In May 2018, restoration hopes were renewed when a private restoration fund was created by Bennett Levin, a former Philadelphia commissioner, and Wick Moorman, a former CEO of Amtrak. No. 1361 needed a newly welded boiler, which would cost at least $1,000,000. Levin and Moorman said that the restored locomotive would pull an exhibit train consisting of ex-PRR P70 passenger cars and B60 baggage cars.

In February 2019, the group planned to design a new boiler with thicker steel to meet Federal Railroad Administration (FRA) and mechanical engineering standards. In October 2019, No. 1361's tender was fully repaired, given new roller-bearing trucks, and had its water scoop restored for demonstration. In June 2021, the museum hired the contracting firm FMW Solutions to rebuild No. 1361's boiler with a new firebox. In October 2021, the old firebox was removed from No. 1361's boiler as part of the renovation.

In late June 2022, the construction of No. 1361's new firebox began. At the same time, the Pennsylvania Railroad Technical and Historical Society donated $100,512.33 to the RRM for the construction. On October 14, 2022, the RMM and the Western Maryland Scenic Railroad in Cumberland, Maryland, held an evening fundraiser: an excursion pulled by WSMR's No. 1309 steam locomotive; raising more than $13,000 for the restoration. (Note: Additionally, the latter's PRR 3 chime whistle was fitted on No. 1309.) By December 2022, the new firebox was nearing completion.

On February 13, 2023, the RMM acquired an ex-PRR B60b baggage car from the Railway Excursion Management Company for use behind the proposed No. 1361 exhibition train. On May 6, 2023, during the 105th anniversary of No. 1361's construction, the RMM sponsored a fundraiser excursion on the Everett Railroad with 2-6-0 No. 11 pulling it.

In July 2023, the construction work for the new firebox was fully funded. The original PRR firebox design increased the cost and complexity of the work. The new boiler is being fabricated with welded rather than riveted seams. In May 2024 the newly repainted tender was unveiled. In January 2025, the Strasburg Rail Road's mechanical services team in Strasburg, Pennsylvania, determined that No. 1361's driving wheels had passed FRA inspection with no need for refurbishment. As of 2026, the restoration is still underway. The full restoration of the locomotive and exhibition cars is estimated at $2.5M USD and is dependent upon funding.

== See also ==
- Atlanta and West Point 290
- Baltimore and Ohio 5300
- Boston and Maine 3713
- Pennsylvania Railroad 1737
- Reading and Northern 425
- Southern Railway 1401

== Bibliography ==
- Cupper, Dan (July 1987). "Altoona's K4 under steam!". Railfan & Railroad. Vol. 6, no. 10. Carstens Publications. pp. 42–45, 52–55.
- Drury, George H. (2015). Guide to North American Steam Locomotives (2nd ed.). Kalmbach Media. ISBN 978-1-62700-259-2.
- Pennypacker, Bert; Staufer, Alvin F. (1984). The Many Faces of the Pennsy K-4. Classic Power (1st ed.). N.J. International Inc. ISBN 0-934088-13-6.
- Schafer, Mike; Solomon, Brian (2009). Pennsylvania Railroad. MBI Railroad Color History (2nd ed.). Voyageur Press. ISBN 978-0-7603-2930-6.
- Seidel, David (2008). Horseshoe Curve. Images of Rails (1st ed.). Arcadia Publishing. ISBN 978-0-7385-5707-6.
- Staufer, Alvin F. (1962). Pennsy Power: Steam and Electric Locomotives of the Pennsylvania Railroad, 1900-1957 (1st ed.). Standard Print & Publishing. LCCN 62-20878.
- Westing, Frederick (August 1956). "This is the Story of a Pacific - The World's Greatest K4s". Trains. Kalmbach Publishing Co. pp. 44–50.
- Withuhn, William (2019). American Steam Locomotives: Design and Development, 1880–1960 (1st ed.). Indiana University Press. ISBN 978-0-253-03933-0.
- Ziel, Ron (1990). Mainline Steam Revival (1st ed.). Amereon House. ISBN 0-8488-0863-0.
