= Pennsylvania Railroad 3750 =

Preserved PRR K4s class 4-6-2 steam locomotive

Coordinates: 39°58′56″N 79°9′40″W

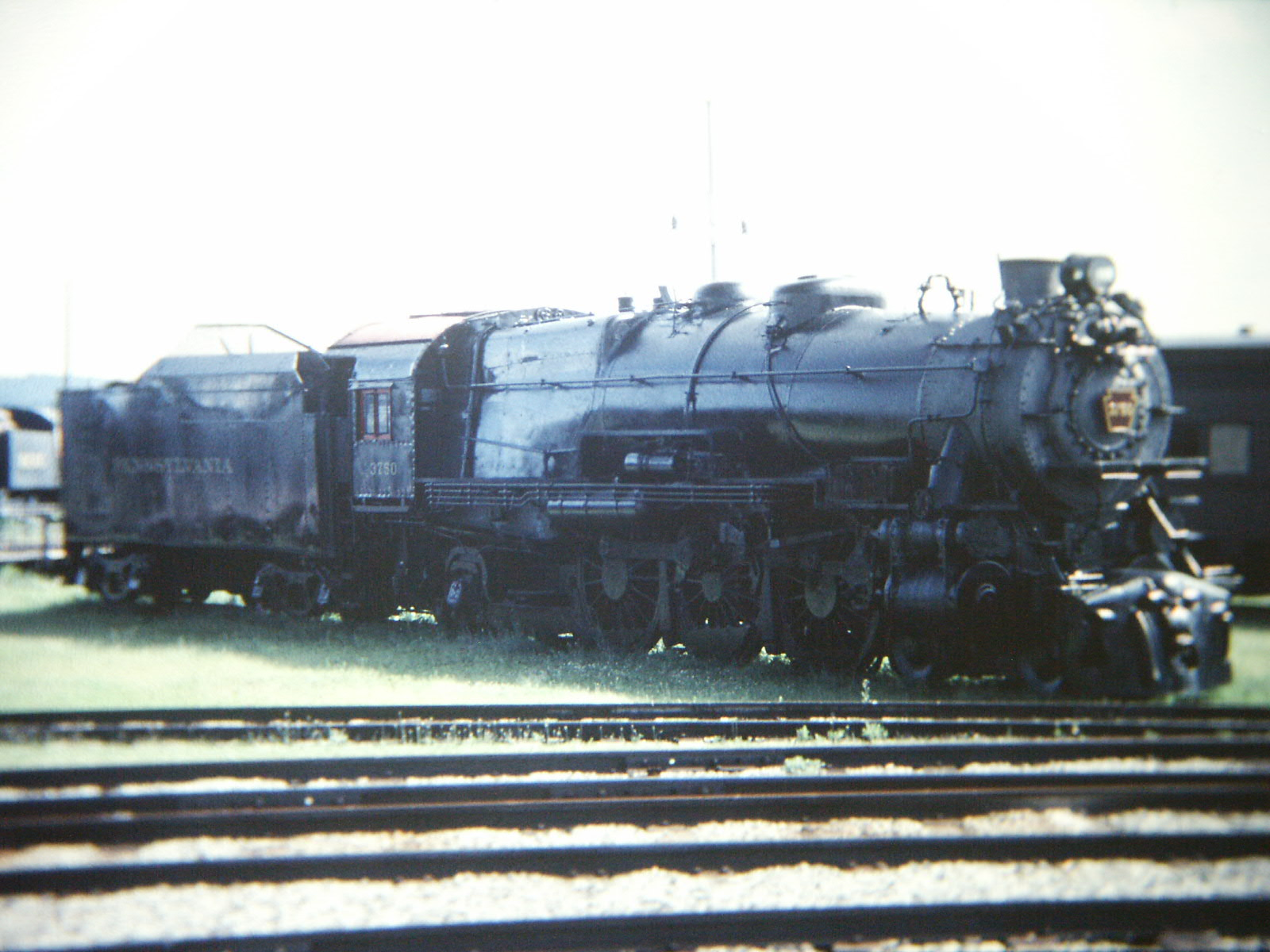
- PRR No. 3750 on display at the Railroad Museum of Pennsylvania (RRMPA) in July 1984
Type and origin
- Power type: Steam
- Designer: James T. Wallis, Alfred W. Gibbs, and Axel Vogt
- Builder: Juniata Shops
- Serial number: 3703
- Build date: April 1920
Specifications
- Configuration
  - Whyte: 4-6-2
- Gauge: 4 ft 8 1/2 in (1,435 mm)
- Leading dia.: 36 in (914 mm)
- Driver dia.: 80 in (2,032 mm)
- Trailing dia.: 50 in (1,270 mm)
- Wheelbase: 13 ft 10 in (4.2 m) between driving axles
- Length: 84 ft 6 in (25.8 m)
- Loco weight: 274,500 lb (124,511 kg)
- Tender type: 110-P-75
- Fuel type: Coal
- Fuel capacity: 18.5 tonnes (41,000 lb)
- Water cap.: 11,980 US gallons (45,300 L)
- Firebox
  - Grate area: 70 ft^{2} (7 m^{2})
- Boiler pressure: 205 psi (1,413 kPa)
- Cylinders: Two, outside
- Cylinder size: 27 in × 28 in (686 mm × 711 mm)
- Loco brake: Air
- Train brakes: Air
- Couplers: Knuckle
Performance figures
- Tractive effort: 44,460 lbf (197,767.9 N)
- Factor of adh.: 4.54
Career
- Operators: Pennsylvania Railroad
- Class: K4
- Numbers: PRR 3750
- First run: April 1920
- Retired: October 1957
- Preserved: April 28, 1958
- Current owner: Pennsylvania Historical and Museum Commission
- Disposition: On static display

U.S. National Register of Historic Places
- Official name: Passenger Locomotive No. 1737
- Designated: December 17, 1979
- Part of: Pennsylvania Railroad Rolling Stock TR
- Reference no.: 79002273

Pennsylvania Railroad 3750 is a 4-6-2 "Pacific" type steam locomotive built by Juniata Shops in April 1920 for the Pennsylvania Railroad (PRR) as a member of the K4 class, which was the most reputed mainline passenger locomotive of the PRR system. No. 3750 also pulled Warren G. Harding's political campaign train during 1920 and three years later, hauled his funeral train from Washington, D.C. to Baltimore, Maryland. In the mid-1950s, it saw its final revenue run, pulling commuter trains in New Jersey.

After retiring from revenue service in late 1957, it was salvaged for preservation and renumbered to represent No. 1737, the prototype of the K4s class that was scrapped due to its poor condition. Afterwards, on December 17, 1979, the locomotive was listed on the National Register of Historic Places. In 1983, No. 3750 was given back its original number and was designated alongside fellow surviving K4s No. 1361 as official state steam locomotives of Pennsylvania by the Pennsylvania General Assembly on December 18, 1987. It is now located at the Railroad Museum of Pennsylvania (RRMPA), just outside Strasburg, Pennsylvania in the United States.

== History ==
=== Revenue service and modifications ===
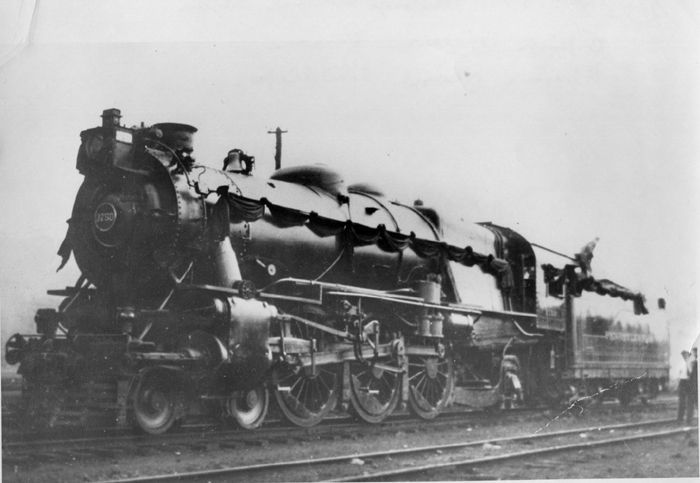
No. 3750 decorated with black buntings to pull Warren G. Harding's funeral train in August 1923

No. 3750 was one of the fifth batch of 50 K4s (Nos. 3726-3775) built in February-August 1920 at the Pennsylvania Railroad's (PRR) Juniata Shops in Altoona, Pennsylvania. It was first built with a square-shaped headlight, a round number plate, a screw reverser, and a 70-P-75 type tender, which held 7,000 US gallons (26,000 L) of water and 12.5 tonnes (28,000 lb) of coal. As part of the 3700 series, No. 3750 was equipped with a short metal hencoop style bar pilot and an electric headlight, unlike the earlier K4s, which were built between 1914 and 1919 with a long sharply pointed wooden cowcatcher and an oil headlight. The locomotive along with the other K4s served as PRR's primary mainline passenger steam locomotives. It was initially assigned to run on PRR's Northeast Corridor mainline between Newark, New Jersey and Washington, D.C., pulling passenger trains. During that same year of 1920, No. 3750 was chosen to be one of the locomotives pulling the political campaign train of Warren G. Harding. Three years later, it pulled Harding's funeral train from Washington, D.C. to Baltimore, Maryland.

In the mid-late 1920s, No. 3750 was re-equipped with a cylindrical-shaped headlight and a keystone shaped number plate. Additionally, No. 3750's original tender was replaced with a 90-P-75 type, which held 9,700 US gallons (37,000 L) of water and 21 tonnes (46,000 lb) of coal. In the 1930s, PRR's passenger train consist grew longer and heavier, which led to No. 3750 and the other K4s required to double head and even triple head each other. Additionally, No. 3750's tender was modified with a mechanical stoker added to increase the locomotive's performance, while No. 3750 was re-equipped with a power reverser. At the same time, PRR's Northeast Corridor lines were electrified and the locomotive was relocated to the Chesapeake Division, running from Washington, D.C. to Wilmington, Delaware; and York, Pennsylvania along with a brief visit to Harrisburg, Pennsylvania.

During World War II, No. 3750 was re-equipped with a larger 110-P-75 type tender designed by W.F. Kiesel, Jr. The new tender held 11,980 US gallons (45,300 L) of water and 18.5 tonnes (41,000 lb) of coal. In 1946, the locomotive was leased to the Long Island Railroad (LIRR), pulling commuter trains on their entire system. No. 3750 returned to the PRR in 1948, and was re-equipped with a cast steel pilot and a vertically retractable coupler. Its headlight and dynamo's positions were switched from the front and top of the smokebox. Additionally, a platform stand was added to the bottom front of No. 3750's smokebox for the maintenance crew to attend and inspect its headlight and dynamo. Afterwards, the locomotive was allocated to the Central Region west of Pittsburgh, Pennsylvania, mostly in Ohio.

Around the mid-1950s, No. 3750 returned to the Eastern Region, where it worked on the New York Division pulling passenger trains again on the Northeast Corridor mainline from Jersey City, New Jersey to Trenton, New Jersey for several months and then relocated to the Philadelphia Division to haul scheduled commuter trains from Philadelphia to Pemberton Township, New Jersey on the Pemberton Branch and Atlantic City, New Jersey on the Pennsylvania-Reading Seashore Lines. Additionally, it pulled racetrack specials from Philadelphia to Garden State Park Racetrack in Cherry Hill, New Jersey. The locomotive was also loaned to the northern New Jersey Shore to pull commuter trains between Perth Amboy and Bay Head, New Jersey on the New York and Long Branch (NY&LB) line to cover for the NY&LB K4s, which were sent to Camden, New Jersey for routine boiler wash. After being retired from revenue service in October 1957, No. 3750 was put into storage at the West Philadelphia roundhouse, awaiting its fate.

=== Preservation ===
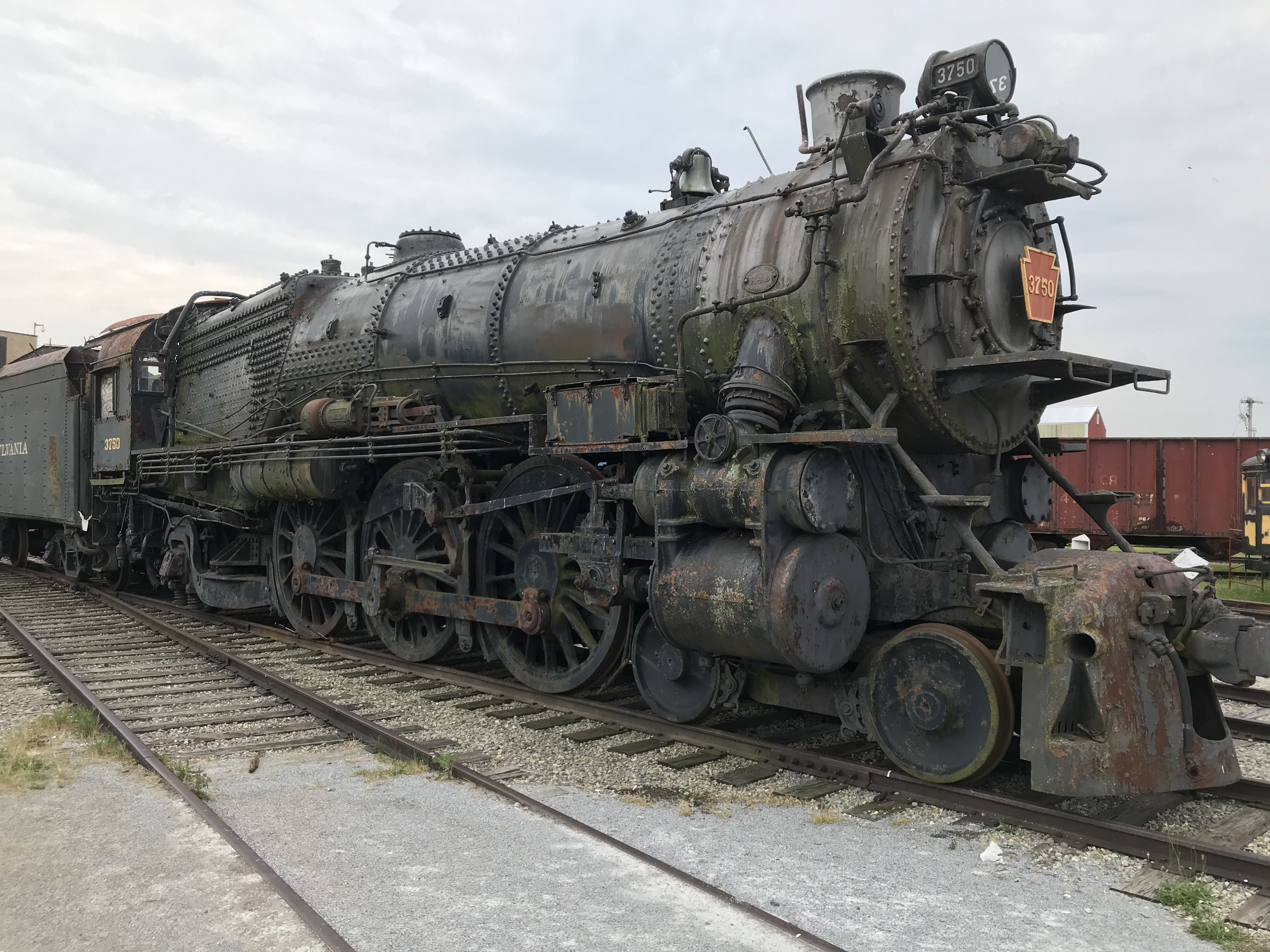
No. 3750 on display outside the Railroad Museum of Pennsylvania in June 2021

During the 1950s, PRR began to salvage each steam locomotive class for preservation; A5 0-4-0 No. 94, B6sb 0-6-0 No. 1670, D16sb 4-4-0 No. 1223, E6 4-4-2 No. 460, E7 4-4-2 No. 7002, G5 4-6-0 No. 5741, H3 2-8-0 No. 1187, H6sb 2-8-0 No. 2846, H10 2-8-0 No. 7688, L1 2-8-2 No. 520, and M1b 4-8-2 No. 6755 at the Northumberland roundhouse in Northumberland, Pennsylvania. Additionally, they chose No. 1737, which was the first of the K4 class built. However, PRR left it idled outside in Altoona, exposed to the elements before being transported to the Northumberland roundhouse. As a result, No. 1737 was determined to be in a very poor state for preservation. Although, a complete overhaul was the only way to save No. 1737, the PRR did not have the funds to do so.

On April 29, 1958, PRR decided to save No. 3750 from being scrapped and use it as a stand-in for No. 1737. It was renumbered to 1737 with the number plate and a nearly identical 110-P-75 type tender from the real No. 1737, and kept it in storage alongside the other preserved steam locomotives at the Northumberland roundhouse. In February 1960, the deteriorated No. 1737 locomotive was broken up for scrap.

In 1968, No. 3750, still numbered 1737, was moved along with the rest of the preserved PRR steam locomotives to the Strasburg Rail Road in Strasburg, Pennsylvania. The entire PRR steam locomotive collection came under threat in the 1970s when the PRR's successor, the Penn Central estate, sought to raise cash by selling it for scrap. The Pennsylvania Legislature intervened, and forgave some back taxes in exchange for PC deeding the collection to the state. Since 1975, the entire PRR steam locomotive collection, including No. 3750, is now preserved at the RRMPA.

During a cosmetic restoration in June 1983, No. 3750 had been given back its original number. On December 18, 1987, the Pennsylvania General Assembly designated Nos. 3750 and 1361 as the official state steam locomotives, while also designating GG1 No. 4859 as the state electric locomotive in the same bill. The No. 3750 locomotive currently sits on outdoor display at the RRMPA, exposed to the elements. The RRMPA volunteer group plans to have the locomotive cosmetically restored prior to it being placed in a roundhouse that is currently under construction as of July 2025.

== See also ==
- List of Pennsylvania state symbols
- National Register of Historic Places listings in Lancaster County, Pennsylvania

== Bibliography ==
- Drury, George H. (2015). Guide to North American Steam Locomotives (2nd ed.). Kalmbach Media. ISBN 978-1-62700-259-2.
- Morrison, David D. (2018). Long Island Rail Road: Oyster Bay Branch. Images of Rail (1st ed.). Arcadia Publishing. ISBN 978-1-4671-2854-4.
- Pennypacker, Bert; Staufer, Alvin F. (1984). The Many Faces of the Pennsy K-4. Classic Power (1st ed.). N.J. International Inc. ISBN 0-934088-13-6.
- Schafer, Mike; Solomon, Brian (2009). Pennsylvania Railroad. MBI Railroad Color History (2nd ed.). Voyageur Press. ISBN 978-0-7603-2930-6.
- Staufer, Alvin F. (1962). Pennsy Power: Steam and Electric Locomotives of the Pennsylvania Railroad, 1900-1957 (1st ed.). Standard Print & Publishing. LCCN 62-20878.
- Westing, Frederick (August 1956). "This is the Story of a Pacific - The World's Greatest K4s". Trains. Kalmbach Publishing Co. pp. 44–50.
- Withuhn, William (2019). American Steam Locomotives: Design and Development, 1880–1960 (1st ed.). Indiana University Press. ISBN 978-0-253-03933-0.
