= Pennsylvania Railroad 1737 =

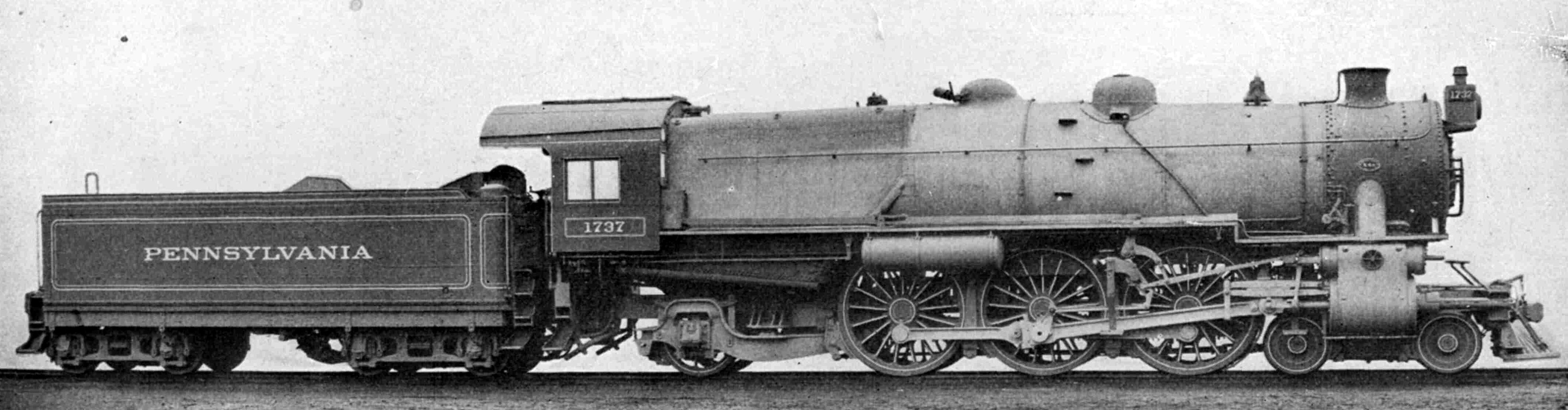
- PRR No. 1737 builder's photo in May 1914
Type and origin
- Power type: Steam
- Designer: J.T. Wallis, Alfred W. Gibbs, and Axel Vogt
- Builder: Altoona Works
- Serial number: 2825
- Build date: May 1914
Specifications
- Configuration
  - Whyte: 4-6-2
- Gauge: 4 ft 8 1/2 in (1,435 mm)
- Leading dia.: 36 in (914 mm)
- Driver dia.: 80 in (2,032 mm)
- Trailing dia.: 50 in (1,270 mm)
- Wheelbase: 13 ft 10 in (4.2 m) between driving axles
- Length: 83 ft 6 in (25.5 m)
- Axle load: 66,500 lb (30,200 kg; 30.2 t)
- Adhesive weight: 199,500 lb (90,500 kg; 90.5 t)
- Loco weight: 304,500 lb (138,100 kg; 138.1 t)
- Tender weight: 212,725 lb (96,490 kg; 96.490 t)
- Total weight: 517,225 lb (234,609 kg; 234.609 t)
- Fuel type: Coal
- Fuel capacity: 22 short tons (20 t)
- Water cap.: 11,300 US gallons (43,000 L)
- Firebox
  - Grate area: 69.89 sq ft (6.49 m^{2})
- Boiler pressure: 205 psi (1,413 kPa)
- Heating surface: 4,041 square feet (375 m^{2})
- Cylinders: Two, outside
- Cylinder size: 27 in × 28 in (686 mm × 711 mm)
- Valve gear: Walschaert
- Valve type: Piston valves
Performance figures
- Tractive effort: 44,460 lbf (197,770 N)
- Factor of adh.: 4.54
Career
- Operators: Pennsylvania Railroad
- Class: K4s
- Numbers: PRR 1737
- Delivered: 1914
- First run: 1914
- Retired: 1956
- Disposition: Scrapped

Pennsylvania Railroad 1737 was a 4-6-2 Pacific type K4 class steam locomotive built in 1914 as the first of its class and would haul heavier passenger trains that the smaller E class 4-4-2 Atlantics could not handle such as the PRR's flagship passenger train, the Broadway Limited. In the 1930s, as the PRR had increased passenger service time tables, the trains became longer and heavier than a single K4s could handle, necessitating double-heading with a second engine. The "Standard Railroad Of The World" made attempts to replace the 1737 and its classmates with larger, more powerful classes including: K5, S1, and the T1, none of which were successful; thus, the K4s continued hauling passenger trains until the Pennsylvania Railroad replaced steam locomotives with the increasingly-popular and less-costly diesel-electric locomotives in 1957.

== History ==
=== Origin and trials ===
No. 1737 was the prototype of K4 class 4-6-2 steam locomotive built in May 1914 at Juniata Shop for the Pennsylvania Railroad (PRR).

=== Revenue service ===
The 1737 was no stranger to commuter service. The New York and Long Branch Railroad in South Amboy, New Jersey used the K4s to haul commuter trains. When the famous electric Pennsylvania Railroad class GG1 would bring the trains from New York City's Penn Station, the K4s would take over the train and make the run from the South Amboy station to Bay Head, New Jersey.

=== Fate ===
In May 1956, No. 1737 was chosen to be preserved as part of the PRR's Historical Collection at a roundhouse in Northumberland, Pennsylvania. However, the locomotive was left outside in Altoona, exposed to the elements to the point where it was completely deteriorated in very poor condition to be preserved. Instead, the PRR quietly took another K-4, No. 3750, and renumbered it to represent No. 1737 while the real No. 1737 was broken up for scrap in February 1960. No. 1737's original 110-P-75 tender is now coupled to No. 3750.

== See also ==
- Pennsylvania Railroad 1361

== Bibliography ==
- Staufer, Alvin F. (1962). Pennsy Power: Steam and Electric Locomotives of the Pennsylvania Railroad, 1900-1957 (1st ed.). Standard Print & Publishing. LCCN 62-20878.
- Withuhn, William (2019). American Steam Locomotives: Design and Development, 1880–1960 (1st ed.). Indiana University Press. ISBN 978-0-253-03933-0.
