= Railroaders Memorial Museum =

Railroad museum in Altoona, Pennsylvania

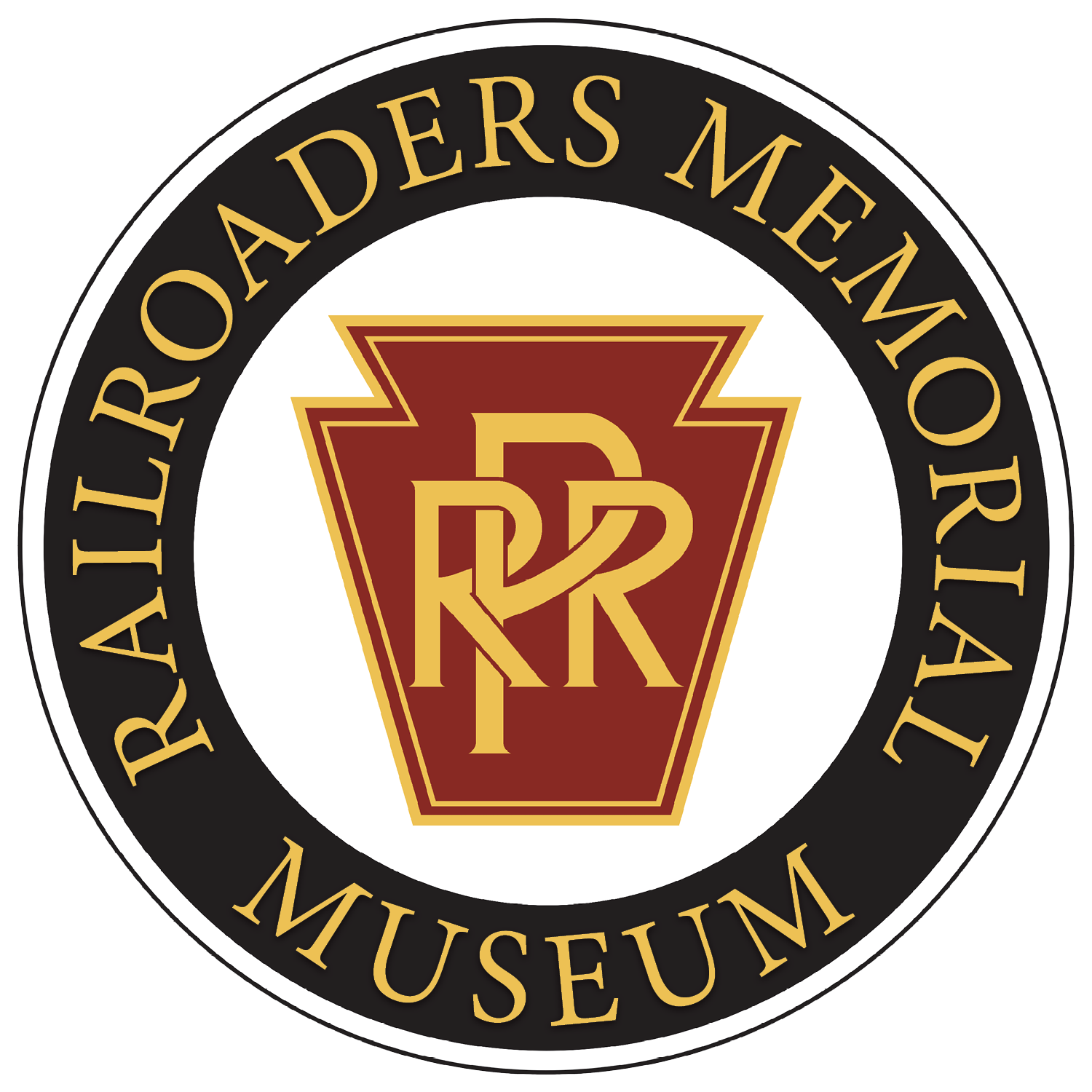

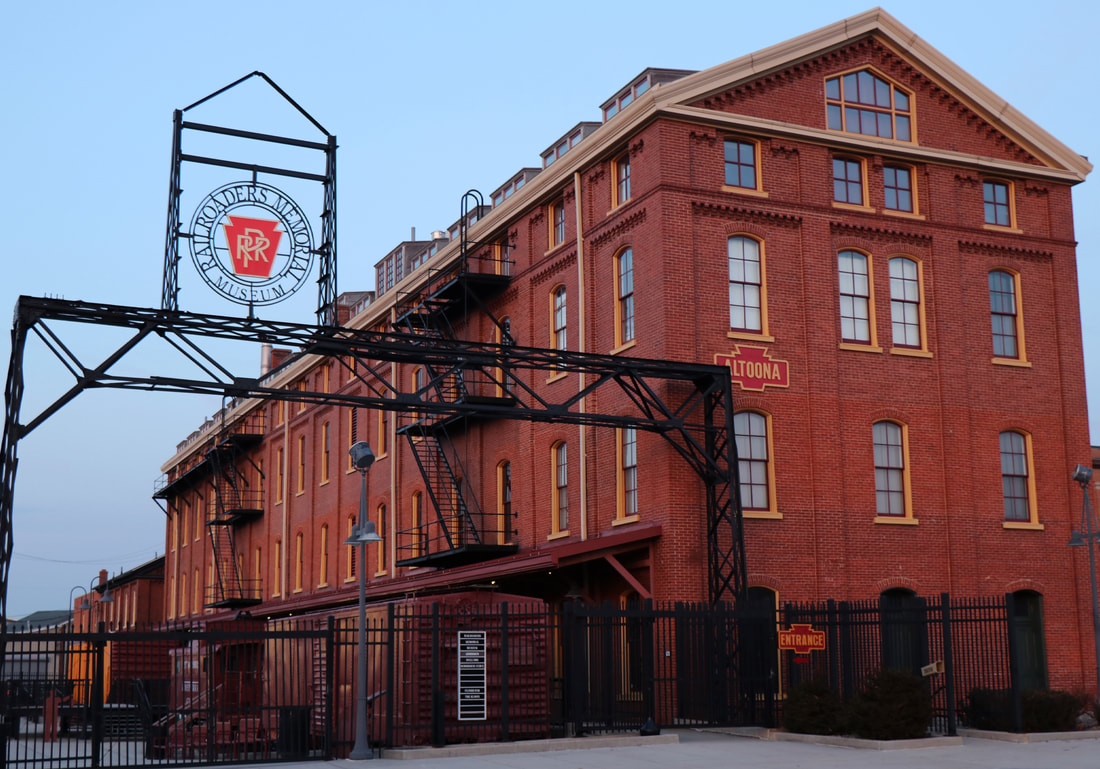
- Main gates of the Railroaders Memorial Museum in Altoona, PA

- Location within Pennsylvania
- Established: 21 September 1980
- Location: Altoona, Pennsylvania
- Coordinates: 40°30′52.01″N 78°23′57.01″W
- Type: Railway Museum
- Executive director: Joseph DeFrancesco
- Chairperson: Wick Moorman
- Website: www.railroadcity.org

The Railroaders Memorial Museum (RMM) is a railroad museum in Altoona, Pennsylvania.

Opened in 1980, the museum focuses on the history of railroad workers and railroad communities in central Pennsylvania, particularly Altoona, the Altoona Works, and the greater Pittsburgh area. Since 1998, the museum has occupied the Master Mechanics Building, built by the Pennsylvania Railroad in 1882. It also operates a satellite museum, visitor center, and observation area at the Horseshoe Curve.

== History ==
=== Formation ===
Public proposals to create a railroad museum in Altoona date at least to 1938, when the Altoona Mirror published a letter to the editor suggesting the city develop a tourism industry, including a "community railroad museum", centered around its railroad history. In 1959, Altoona's Chamber of Commerce proposed a similar museum. By 1963, a proposal for a "Pennsyland" railroad museum led representatives of the city's Tourism Bureau to compete against the Strasburg Rail Road in Lancaster County for possession of 28 pieces of decommissioned Pennsylvania Railroad rolling stock. Negotiations intensified when the Pennsylvania General Assembly chartered the Railroad Museum of Pennsylvania but did not immediately designate a location. In 1965, Strasburg was selected as the site for the state museum and later awarded the contested Pennsylvania Railroad stock, which included historic steam locomotives and passenger cars being kept at a roundhouse in Northumberland.

Despite the state's decision, the Altoona Railway Museum Club carried on with efforts to construct a museum in Altoona. In 1968, the club was granted a charter by the National Railway Historical Society to begin operating as the Horseshoe Curve Chapter. The chapter collected railroad artifacts to display in empty storefronts and at civic events in attempts to raise public support for a museum. The Railroaders Memorial Museum was incorporated in 1972 to raise more funds and collect more artifacts. The new group's first major acquisition was the 1975 purchase of The Loretto, a private railroad car built for steel tycoon Charles M. Schwab. That same year, the Altoona Redevelopment Authority sold a parcel of land previously purchased from the Penn Central Transportation Company to a private developer for use as a shopping center. The land deal stipulated that the developer donate a portion of the property and $50,000 towards museum construction. The Railroaders Memorial Museum received full ownership of the property in 1978. Groundbreaking ceremonies for the new museum were held on May 13, 1979. The museum, still incomplete, opened to the public on September 21, 1980.

=== Initial restoration campaigns ===
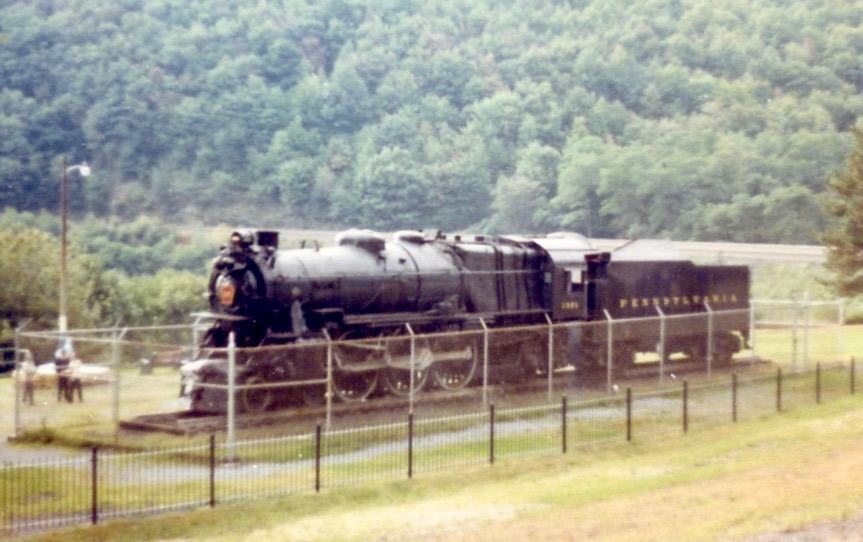
A pre-restoration PRR 1361 on display at the Horseshoe Curve.

In the early hours of October 8, 1983, The Loretto was badly damaged by arson. Two juveniles were charged with setting the fire, whose damage was estimated at $200,000. The Restore the Loretto Committee was formed to raise money to restore and preserve the railroad car.

Altoona's city council later wondered whether a similar campaign could be organized for PRR 1361, a deteriorating K4 steam locomotive owned by the city and displayed at the Horseshoe Curve. Museum officials immediately lobbied for a role in the project. The city established the Horseshoe Curve Task Force to investigate the feasibility and costs of restoring No. 1361. In 1985, the Railroaders Memorial Museum was granted possession of the PRR 1361 on condition that a suitable replacement be provided to the Horseshoe Curve; Conrail subsequently donated PRR 7048, a GP9 diesel-electric locomotive, for the purpose. Pennsylvania State Representative Richard Geist announced that the museum would receive a $50,000 grant and a crew of state workers to move No. 1361 and begin a cosmetic restoration.

At the museum's mortgage-burning ceremony on September 28, 1985, Conrail chairman L. Stanley Crane announced that his company would pursue steam train excursions. "The K4 [1361] would be a very appropriate locomotive to do that with," said Crane. The move was intended to put Conrail in step with other contemporaneous railroad operators during the company's bid for public offering. Over the next two years, the engine was restored to working condition in Conrail's Altoona railroad shops, but ran for just a year before bearing and axle failures sidelined it indefinitely. Inconsistent direction and financial issues at the museum hindered repairs to the steam engine. In 1996, the disassembled engine was sent for a complete restoration to Steamtown National Historic Site in Scranton, Pennsylvania. The Railroaders Memorial Museum ceased funding the incomplete project in 2007. Pieces of the engine were divided for storage between the museum and East Broad Top Rail Road. The restoration was officially canceled by the museum in 2010. The failed restoration remains a controversial topic due to its lengthy history, technical errors, and use of state funds.

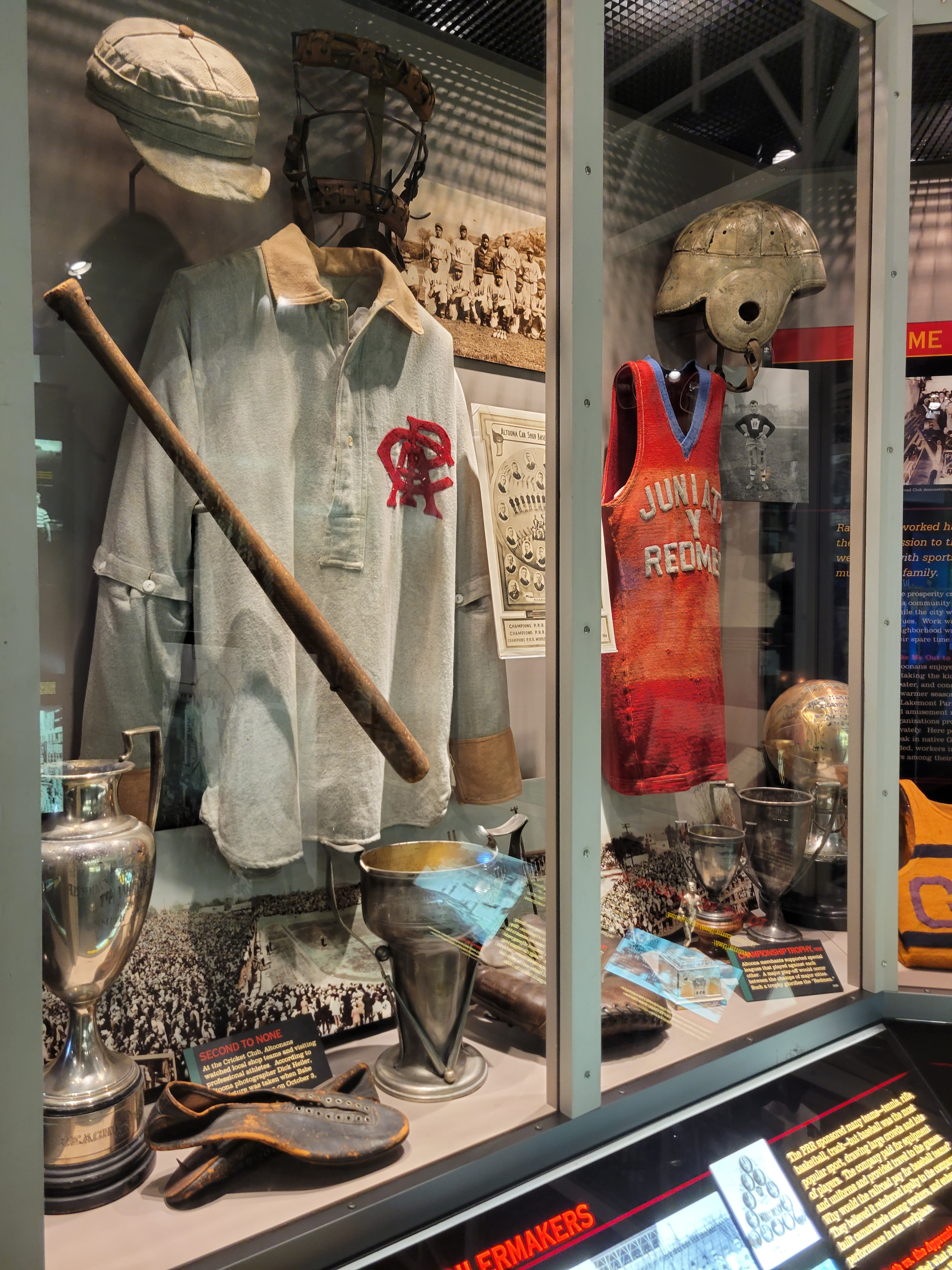
An exhibit at the Railroaders Memorial Museum displays sport-related artifacts.

=== Expansion ===
The National Park Service's interest in western Pennsylvania's historic roads and sites led to the formation of America's Industrial Heritage Project in 1988. Congress authorized the commission to identify historic sites of heavy industry and to help develop a more interconnected tourism industry in southwestern Pennsylvania. The commission identified the cities of Altoona and Johnstown as potential focal points for the new tourist industry. As part of the program, the Railroaders Memorial Museum collaborated with officials from the National Park Service to renovate tourist facilities at the nearby Horseshoe Curve. The $5.8 million renovations were completed in 1992 with the dedication of a new visitors center to be operated by the museum.

Museum officials also collaborated with agents from America's Industrial Heritage Project to seek a larger space for the Railroaders Memorial Museum. In 1990, the museum expressed interest in moving to the nearby Master Mechanics Building. The four-floor brick office building had originally been constructed by the Pennsylvania Railroad, with sections of the building dating to 1882. It had last been occupied by Conrail and vacated in 1984. The $12 million project was funded by the National Park Service, the Federal Highway Administration, and a state grant. Bureaucracy and natural disasters delayed the project and briefly plunged the museum into a fiscal crisis. Grand opening ceremonies were finally held on April 25, 1998.

=== Management changes ===
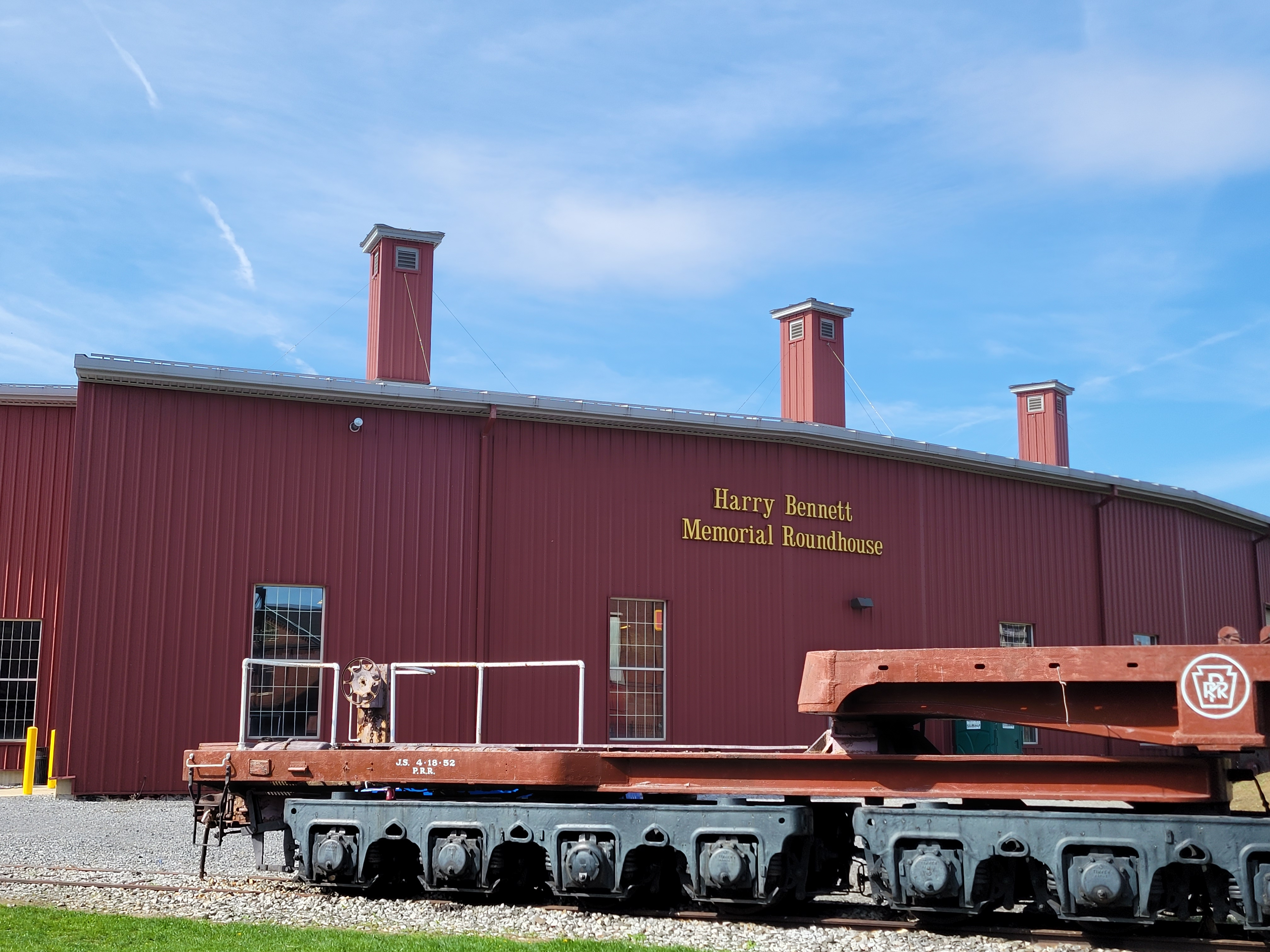
The Harry Bennett Memorial Roundhouse opened on museum grounds in 2010.

In May 2002, a new member of the board of directors—Dean McKnight, a senior vice president at M&T Bank—alerted his fellow board members that the museum was dangerously close to insolvency. An internal audit showed that the museum had maxed out its line of credit and was hundreds of thousands of dollars in debt. Despite public reports showing that the museum had been steadily losing money since its reopening in 1998, the board expressed shock upon learning that they couldn't "afford to open the doors." The eleven other members of the board soon resigned.

The new board members hired the Westsylvania Heritage Corporation, another descendant of America's Industrial Heritage Project, to run the museum, and approved drastic measures to keep the museum afloat. They cut the operating budget and laid off more than half of the museum's employees. The paid services were largely replaced with volunteer labor. They began to seek more revenue by hosting events and renting the museum's facilities. The museum gradually reduced its outstanding debt.

In 2007, the board transferred museum operations to the Salone Management Group, which had previously organized concerts at the museum as part of its events programming. Board members and the outgoing executive director cited company's greater financial resources as reasoning for the transfer. In 2010, Salone Management Group oversaw construction of a quarter-roundhouse on the museum grounds.

In 2020, the board of directors hired a new executive director: Joseph DeFrancesco, a former executive director of the Blair County Historical Society. Shortly thereafter, the COVID-19 pandemic temporarily closed the Railroaders Memorial Museum and Horseshoe Curve visitor center. DeFrancesco ordered "cuts across the board" and restructured the museum. The museum reopened in March 2021. On June 24, 2021, the Railroaders Memorial Museum hired FMW Solutions to again restore the PRR 1361 to operating condition. Charles "Wick" Moorman, a retired railroad executive with both Norfolk Southern Corporation and Amtrak, was elected chairman of the board.

== Building ==
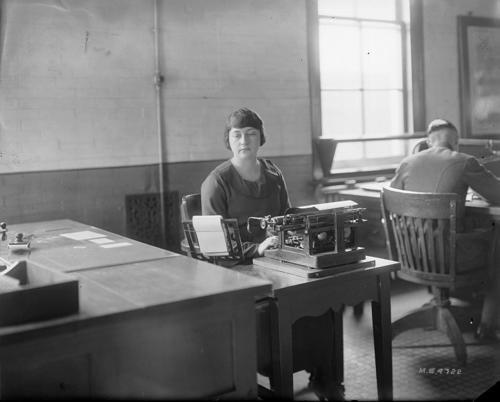
Office worker at the Master Mechanics Building in 1919.

Since 1998, the museum has occupied the Master Mechanics Building built by the Pennsylvania Railroad as part of its Altoona Works, once the world's largest complex of railroad shop facilities. The railroad began building shop facilities at Altoona in 1849, and within three decades had multiple campuses across the city, including locomotive and rail car fabrication and repair shops, a paint shop, a blacksmith shop, a brass foundry, and an iron foundry.

The two-story Master Mechanics Building was completed in 1882; it contained administrative offices and was the first home of the railroad's Test Department: physical and chemical testing laboratories inspired by those of European railroads. In 1886, a third story was added to the building, giving the Test Department two entire floors. Test Department workers helped the Pennsylvania Railroad achieve company-wide standardization through their analysis of materials used in railroad construction and maintenance. Railroad officials also used the laboratories for public relations; for example, Test Department employees gave demonstrations at the railroad's exhibit at the 1893 World's Columbian Exposition in Chicago. By 1909, the Master Mechanics Building had been expanded to four floors, but the Test Department needed yet more space, and in 1914, the department moved to its own building in the Altoona Works.

The Pennsylvania Railroad and its successors continued to use the building for administrative offices, including railroad police headquarters. It last housed Conrail's medical offices and was vacated in 1984.

Beginning in 1990, the Master Mechanics Building was renovated and remodeled for the museum, which opened in its new space eight years later. The building also houses administrative offices for the Railroaders Heritage Corporation.

Rolling stock is displayed in a courtyard, quarter-roundhouse, and turntable on museum grounds.

The former museum building, also located on the museum grounds, is used for storage.

=== Alleged paranormal activity ===
The museum began marketing the Master Mechanics Building as a haunted tourist attraction in 2003. Halloween tours that year centered on the museum's "real ghost stories." Ghost Hunters, an American paranormal and reality television series, filmed part of an episode inside the museum. The episode portrayed the haunting as fictional. After the episode aired in 2004, local ghost hunters wrote a book claiming that deceased railroad workers haunt the museum.

== Collection ==
PRR 7048
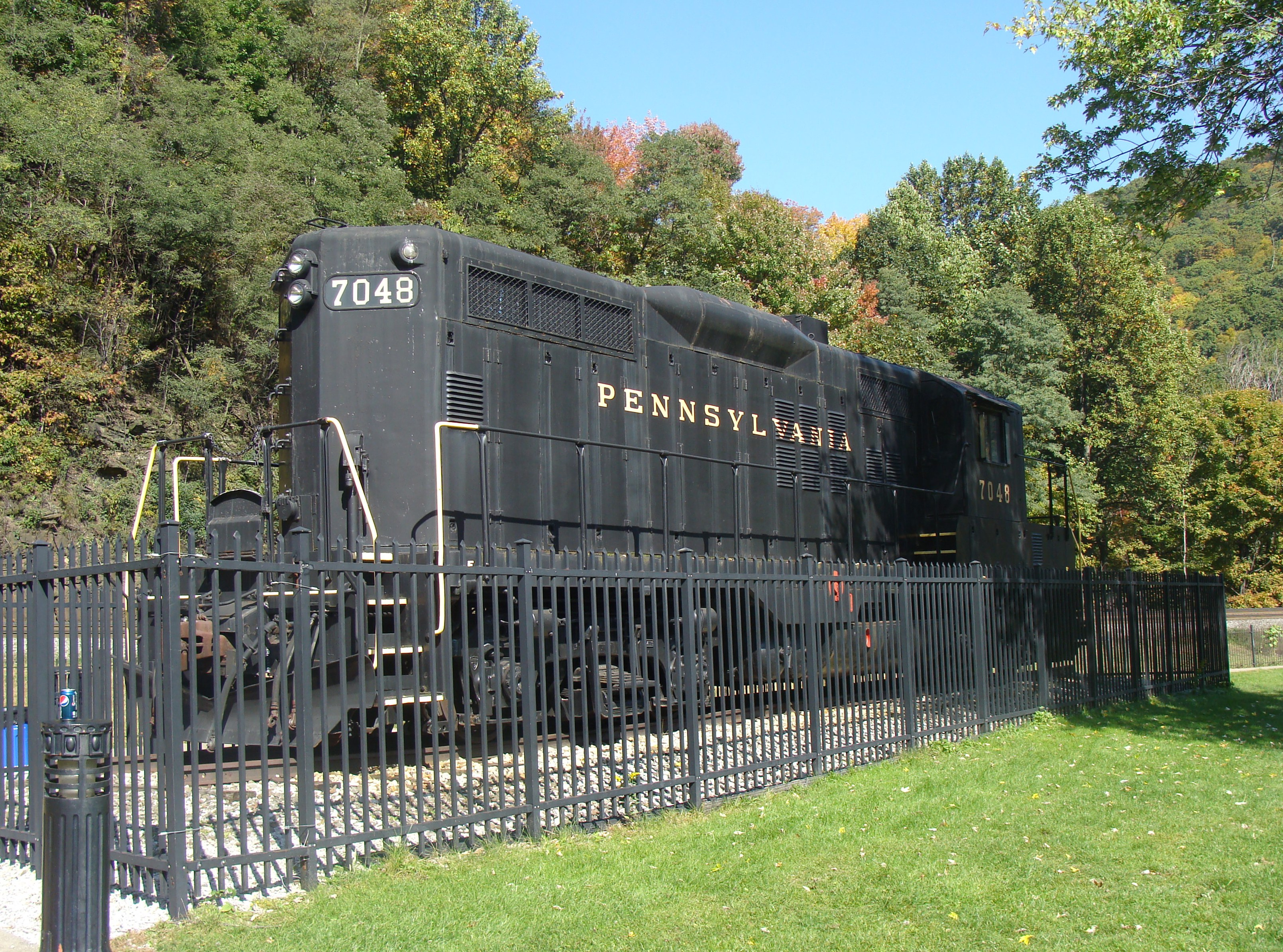
- PRR 7048 at the Horseshoe Curve in October 2011
Type and origin
- Power type: Diesel–electric
- Builder: Electro-Motive Diesel
- Build date: December 1955
Specifications
- Configuration
  - AAR: B-B
- Gauge: 4 ft 8 1/2 in (1,435 mm)
- Prime mover: EMD 567C
Performance figures
- Power output: 1,750 hp (1,300 kW)
Career
- Operators: Pennsylvania Railroad, Penn Central, Conrail
- Class: GP9
- Retired: 1985
- Disposition: On static display in Altoona, Pennsylvania. Cosmetically restored in 2021.

The museum's rolling stock includes Pennsylvania Railroad 1361, a K4 steam locomotive that stood on static display at the Horseshoe Curve from June 8, 1957, until September 1985. It was restored to operating condition but suffered an axle failure within a year. Since 2015, it has been under restoration at a roundhouse on the museum grounds.

No. 1361 was replaced at the Curve by Pennsylvania Railroad 7048, a preserved GP9 Diesel-electric locomotive. The locomotive was built by Electro-Motive Division of General Motors in December 1955 for the Pennsylvania Railroad, and later passed to Conrail. In 1985, Conrail repainted No. 7048 in its original Pennsylvania Railroad livery and donated it to the museum. A cosmetic restoration of 7048 was underway in late summer 2021.

In 2023, the museum acquired former Conrail SD60I #5582 (painted as Penn State University #2020), one of the first modern Conrail road locomotives to survive into preservation.
