= Charlotina =

Proposed British colony in North America

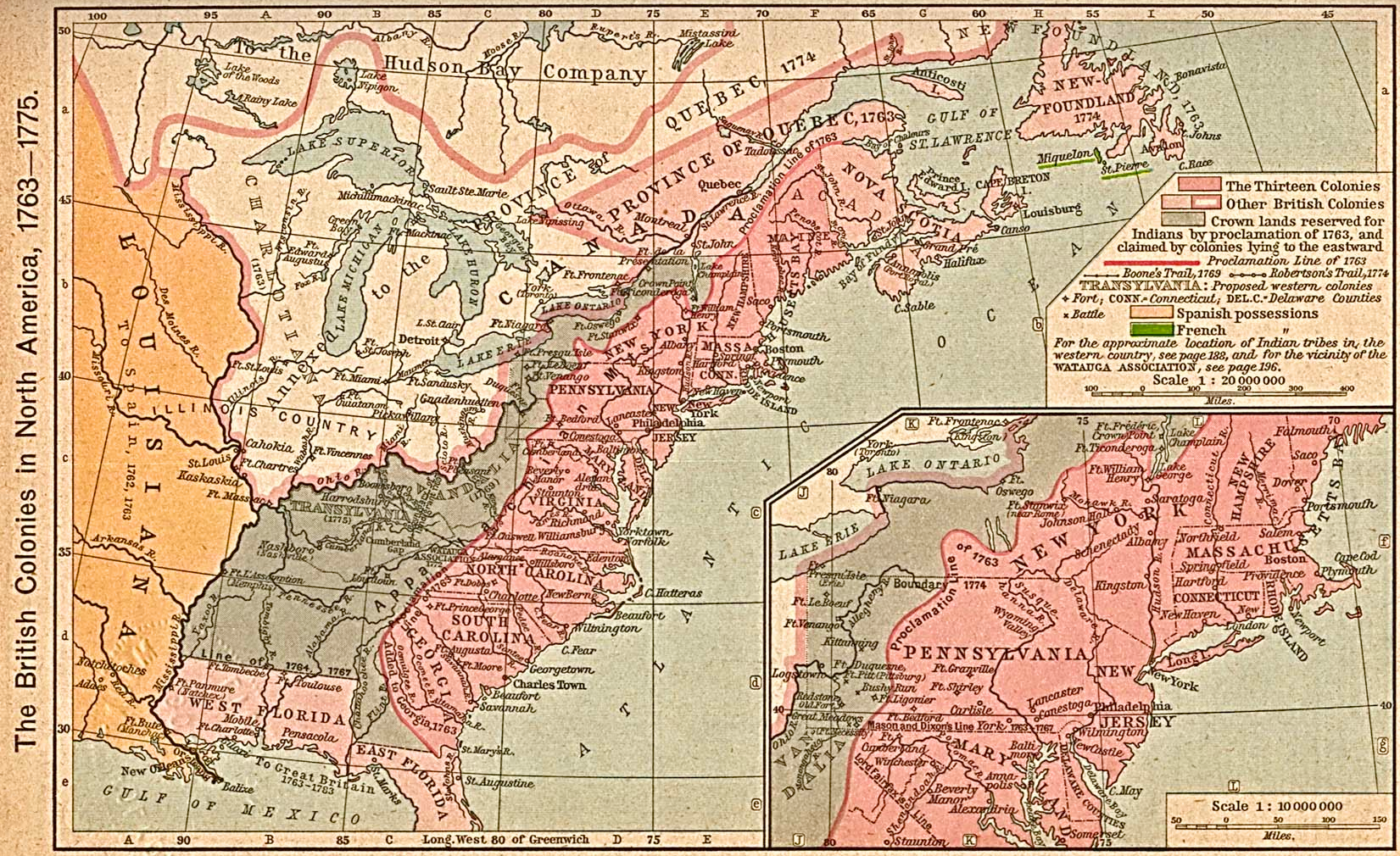
"CHARLOTIANA" appears on this map near Lake Superior and Lake Michigan.

Charlotina was the suggested name for a popularly proposed British crown colony which was to be established in America following the end of the Seven Years' War, in which Great Britain had acquired a large portion of New France in 1763. However, the proposal was met with little official enthusiasm, as the British government's Royal Proclamation of 1763 forbade the creation of new colonies in the Mississippi and Ohio Valleys. Had such a colony been founded, it would have included the region lying west of the Maumee and Wabash rivers; north of the Ohio River; east of the upper Mississippi River; and south of the Great Lakes. These boundaries would include portions of modern-day Minnesota, Ohio, Indiana, and the entirety of Michigan, Illinois, and Wisconsin. Charlotina would have included modern-day cities such as Chicago, Milwaukee, Toledo, Detroit, Fort Wayne, and parts of Minneapolis and St. Paul.

== Background ==
Charlotina was one of several new colonies proposed by various socio-political factions in Britain and North America following the Treaty of Paris of 1763. The argument for the establishment of Charlotina first appeared that same year in a pamphlet entitled "The Expediency of Securing our American Colonies by Settling the Country Adjoining the River Mississippi, and the Country upon the Ohio, Considered', which was published in Edinburgh, Scotland. Similar to the Mississippi Land Company's proposal for a new colony in the same area, nothing came of either proposal, due in large part to the expansion-limiting provisions of the Royal Proclamation Act of 1763.

== Variations ==
The title of the proposed colony is spelled "Charlotiana" in some historical sources, a result of a manuscript error being repeated. Variations of the name, including "Charlottina" and "Charlotta", were revived in 1770 as suggestions for a proposed colony with different boundaries (roughly equivalent to present-day West Virginia), but the name "Vandalia" was chosen instead. "Charlotina" was chosen as a name in honor of Queen Charlotte, as was "Vandalia", since Charlotte was thought to be descended from the Vandals.

Vandalia, like Charlotina, was never established.

== See also ==
- Historic Regions of the United States
- Northwest Territory
- Ohio Country
