= Westsylvania =

Proposed Transappalachian state during the Revolutionary War era

Coordinates: 38.6°N 80.8°W

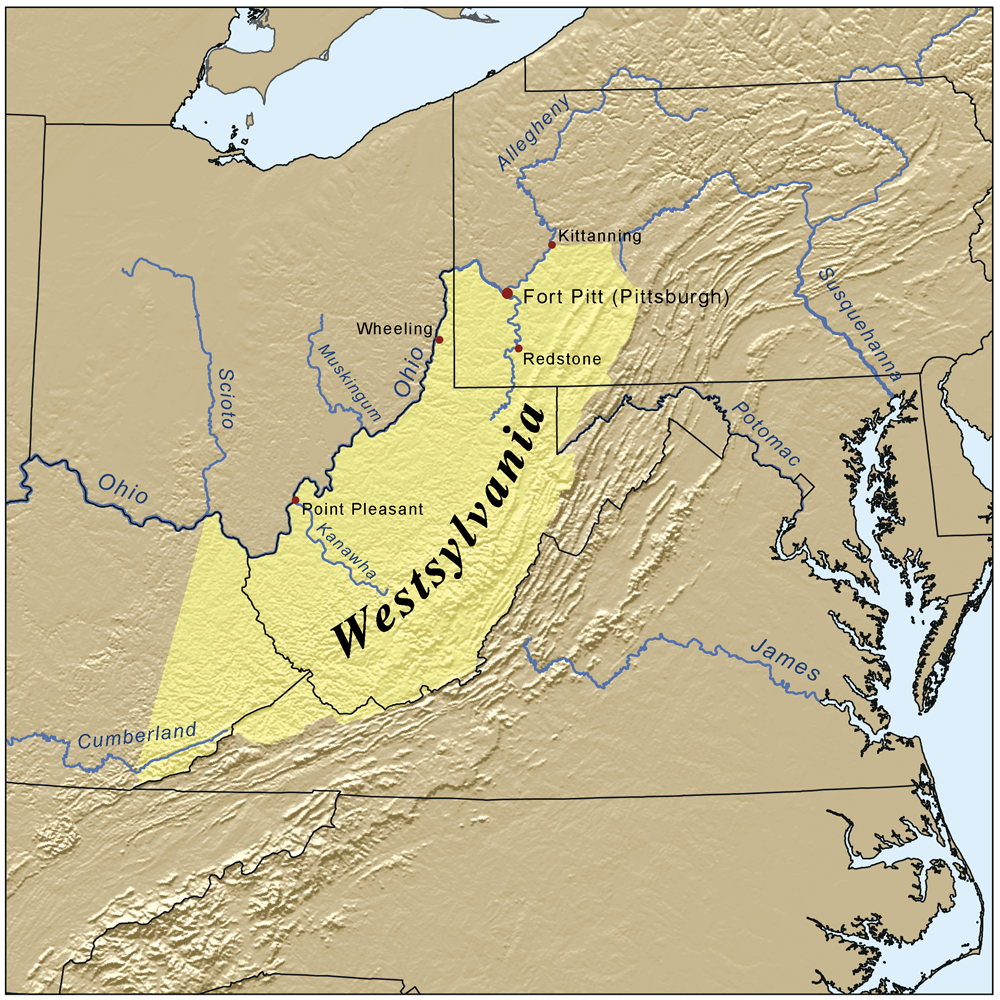
Map over modern state borders

Westsylvania was a proposed state of the United States located in what is now West Virginia, southwestern Pennsylvania, and small parts of Kentucky, Maryland, and Virginia. First proposed early in the American Revolution, Westsylvania would have been the fourteenth state in the newly formed United States, had it been recognized.

== Background ==
In the years before the American Revolutionary War (1775–1783), jurisdiction of the region west of the Allegheny Mountains around Pittsburgh and along the Ohio River had been disputed between the British colonies of Virginia and Pennsylvania. The Mason–Dixon line, which officially established the border between Pennsylvania and Maryland, would have also settled the Virginia-Pennsylvania boundary dispute, but the surveying of the final miles of the Mason-Dixon line was abandoned in 1767 and would not be completed until 1784. In the early 1770s it was therefore unclear whether Pittsburgh and environs were in Pennsylvania or Virginia. Both colonies proceeded as if they had the better claim to the area. Virginia administered the region as the District of West Augusta, while in Pennsylvania it was considered a part of Westmoreland County.

Complicating this border dispute were the vast land claims of the Ohio Company of Virginia and the Indiana Land Company along the Ohio River. The two companies combined forces in 1769 to create the Grand Ohio Company with the intention of creating a colony known as Vandalia, which would have had similar borders to Westsylvania had it been recognized. The outbreak of the American Revolutionary War effectively brought an end to the efforts to establish Vandalia.

== Efforts at recognition ==
Many settlers in the region believed that the governments of Virginia and Pennsylvania were too far removed from the west and were apathetic to western concerns. Inspired by the ideals of the American Revolution, in the summer of 1776 settlers in the region proclaimed their independence from Pennsylvania and Virginia by petitioning the Second Continental Congress to recognize Westsylvania as the fourteenth state. In "The Memorial of the Inhabitants of the Country, West of the Allegheny Mountains," the petitioners reviewed the dispute between Pennsylvania and Virginia, which they believed would "in all Probability terminate in a Civil War". They also informed the Congress that "Land Jobbers" were facilitating unlawful encroachment on Indian land, which would produce "a bloody, ruinous & destructive War with the Indians...." Hoping to create order out of this chaos, the petitioners therefore asked that:

the Said Country be constituted declared & acknowledged a separate, distinct, and independent Province & Government by the Title and under the name of — 'the Province & Government of Westsylvania,' be empowered and enabled to form such Laws & Regulations & such a System of Polity & Government as is best adapted & most agreeable to the peculiar Necessities, local Circumstances & Situation thereof & its inhabitants invested with every other power, Right, Privilege & Immunity, vested, or to be vested in the other American Colonies, be considered as a Sister Colony & the fourteenth Province of the American Confederacy....

States with western land claims were reluctant to recognize the independence of frontier regions, however, and so Congress chose to ignore the petition. In an apparent effort to strengthen its political control of the area, in November 1776 Virginia reorganized the District of West Augusta into three counties: Ohio County, Monongalia County, and Yohogania County. Pennsylvania and Virginia finally settled the boundary dispute in 1780.

Settlement of the boundary dispute sparked a renewal of the Westsylvania movement among Virginians who were outraged to find themselves now living in Pennsylvania. Contributing to this separatist sentiment were those frontiersmen who believed that the national government was not doing enough to protect them from Native American attacks on the western frontier in the final years of the Revolutionary War. In 1782, Hugh Henry Brackenridge, a Pittsburgh lawyer and strong supporter of the national government, convinced the Pennsylvania Assembly to declare that agitation for a separate state was treason. This made promotion of Westsylvania subject to the death penalty. Pennsylvania also sent secret agents, such as the Reverend James Finley, to work against the Westsylvania movement. According to historian Jack Sosin, "Finley's efforts, the threat that the settlers' land might be sold, and the cool reaction to the proposed new state by Congress finally quieted the Westerners."

== See also ==
- Westsylvania Heritage Corporation
- Whiskey Rebellion
- Trans Allegheny Virginia

For similar contemporary movements, see:

- Transylvania Colony
- Watauga Association
- State of Franklin
- Vermont Republic

== Sources ==
- Abernethy, Thomas Perkins. Western Lands and the American Revolution. Originally published 1937. New York: Russell & Russell, 1959.
- Cranmer, Gibson Lamb. History of the Upper Ohio Valley, volume 1. Madison, Wisconsin: Brant & Fuller, 1891. Accessed via Google Book Search.
- Frederic, Harold and William C. Frederick, III. The Westsylvania Pioneers, 1774–1776. Pennsylvania: Mechling Bookbindery, 1991. ISBN 0-9703825-3-7.
- Marder, Daniel. Hugh Henry Brackenridge. New York: Twayne Publishers, 1967.
- Slaughter, Thomas P. The Whiskey Rebellion: Frontier Epilogue to the American Revolution. Oxford University Press, 1986. ISBN 0-19-505191-2.
- Sosin, Jack M. The Revolutionary Frontier, 1763–1783. New York: Holt, 1967.
