= Southwestern Pennsylvania Heritage Preservation Commission =

The Southwestern Pennsylvania Heritage Preservation Commission was a federal commission established within the United States Department of the Interior to oversee the America's Industrial Heritage Project. It was created in 1988 as a means for "recognizing, preserving, promoting, and interpreting the cultural heritage of the 9-county region in southwestern Pennsylvania associated with the three basic industries of iron and steel, coal, and transportation. The Commission sunset on November 18, 2008.

== Projects ==
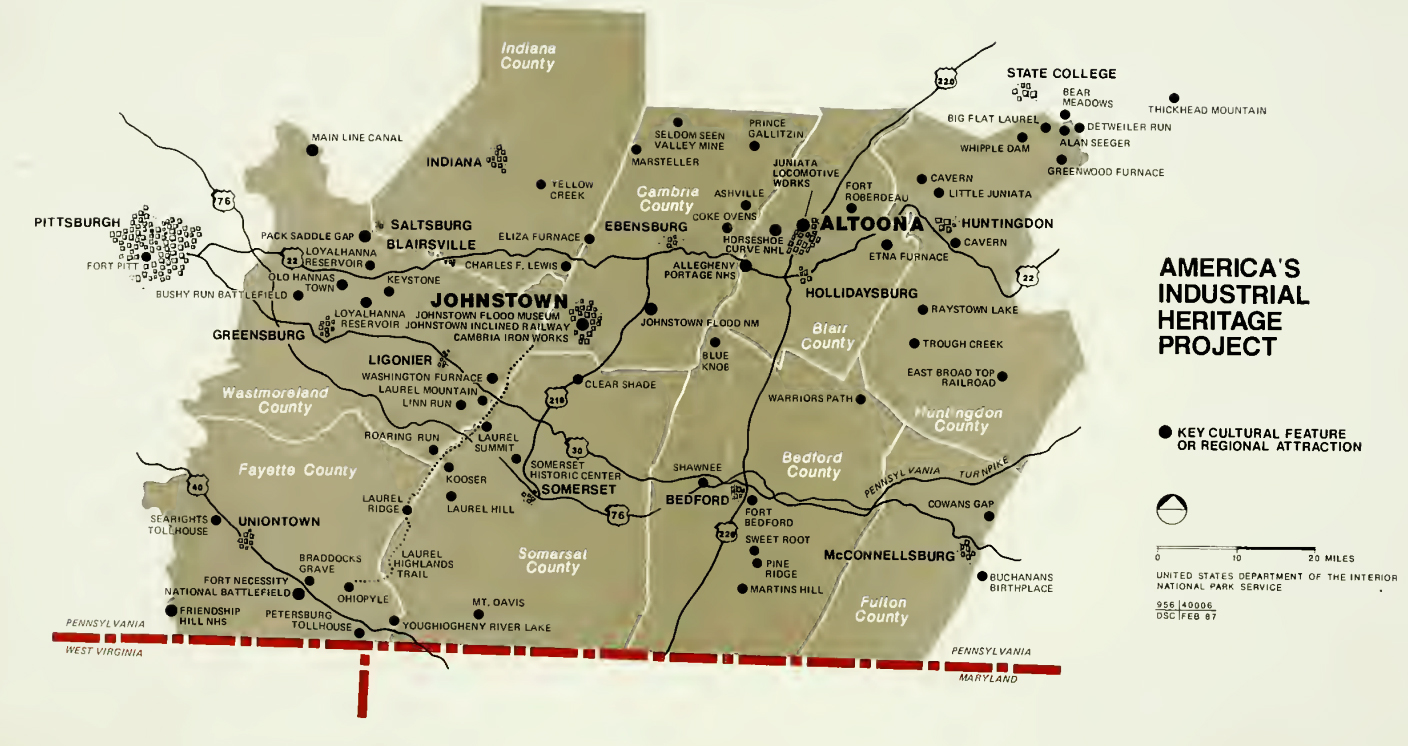
1990 NPS AIHP graphic

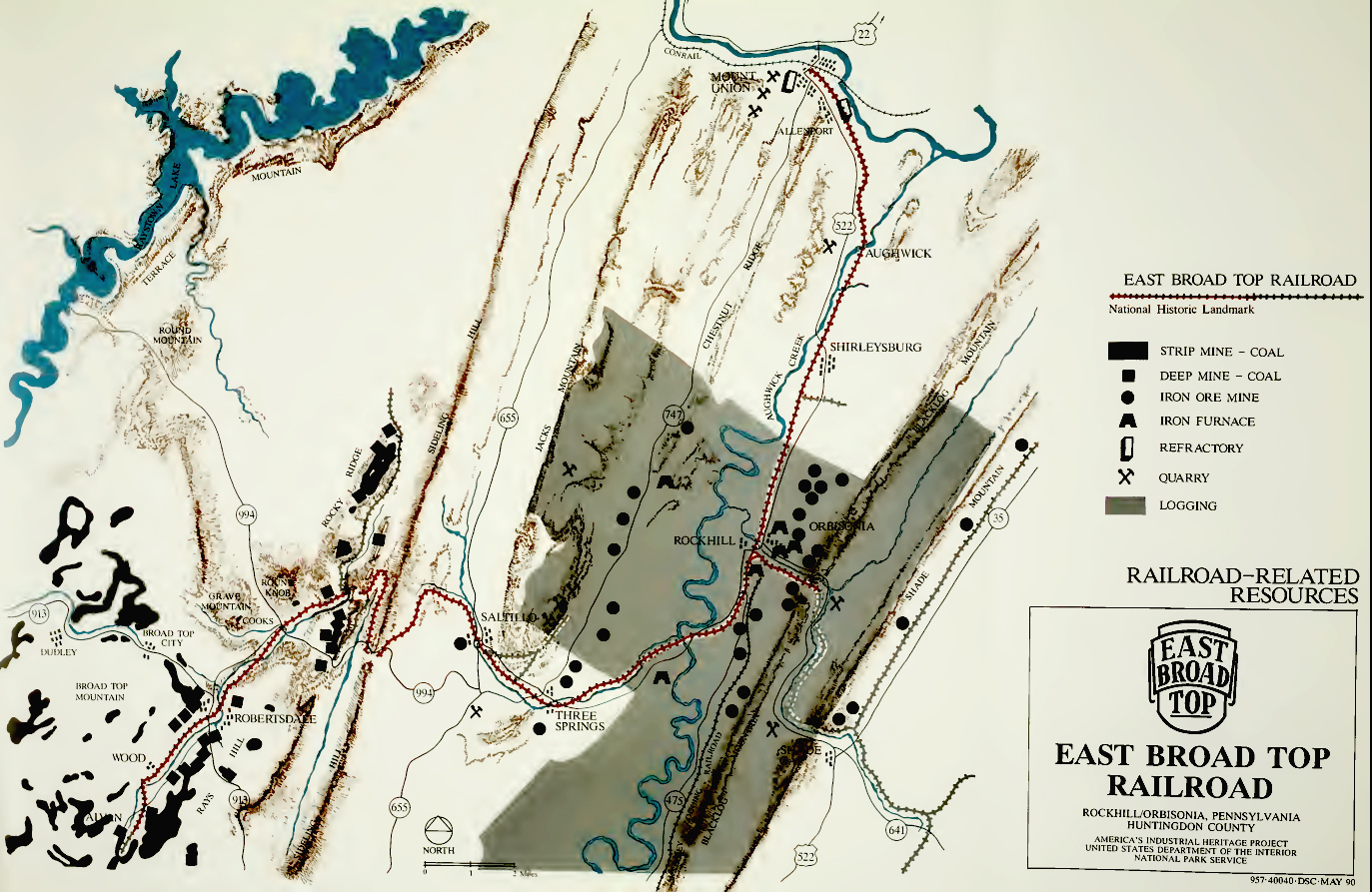
1990 National Park service graphic for RAILROAD-RELATED RESOURCES for the EAST BROAD TOP RAILROAD ROCKHILL/ORBISONIA, PENNSYLVANIA HUNTINGDON COUNTY

=== America's Industrial Heritage Project (AIHP) ===
The purpose of America's Industrial Heritage Project was twofold, according to "Action Plan: America's Industrial Heritage Project", an August 1987 publication of the Heritage Preservation Commission. "First, there will be an examination of the significant contribution of the region's iron, steel, coal, and transportation industries, which helped fuel and move America's industrial growth and development and establish its standing among the nations of the world." Many of the region's cultural resources related not only to its heritage but to the present and future as well. "Second, in addition to the historic sites, the project will use sites within Johnstown and Altoona as focal points for a nine-county tourism promotion program." Tourism development efforts were to take advantage of the region's scenic, natural, and recreational areas and will include these resources as integral to the planning process. Much of the project's background was based in a 1985 National Park Service (NPS) study of the region entitled Reconnaissance Survey of Western Pennsylvania Roads and Sites. The NPS study identified the cultural resources at Johnstown and Altoona as focal points for new tourism initiatives.

==== East Broad Top Railroad National Historic Landmark ====
Early in AIHP planning, Altoona was identified as the focal point around which the story of rail transportation could revolve. Others in the nine-county area included the Allegheny Portage Railroad National Historic Site, a unit of the Park Service; and Horseshoe Curve, a national historic landmark. A third was the privately owned East Broad Top Railroad and Coal Company, which related to the "secondary theme of support industries, including refractory industries, timber, and iron ore production."

The AIHP declared the East Broad Top Railroad National Historic Landmark "the best remaining example in the nation of a regional narrow-gauge railroad system" and "probably the only opportunity in the nation to tell a comprehensive railroad industry story." But the landmark was "seriously threatened through deterioration, lack of operating capital, and legal threats to the right-of-way." Efforts to preserve the landmark were unavailing before the Commission closed in 2008.

== Published works ==
The Commission worked with the National Park service on projects such as: pdf

- America's Industrial Heritage Project (AIHP), 1987 Accessed on September 18, 2021.
- Special History Study: Pennsylvania Railroad Shops and Works in Altoona, Pennsylvania, 1989. Accessed on October 8, 2017.
- Revitalization Plan: Windber and Scalp Level: America's Industrial Heritage Project, Southwestern Pennsylvania. 1989 Accessed on October 8, 2017.
- Study of Alternatives: East Broad Top Railroad: America's Industrial Heritage Project, Southwestern Pennsylvania: draft, 1990 National Park Service Accessed on October 8, 2017.
- Reconnaissance survey: Juniata River corridor : America's Industrial Heritage Project, southwestern Pennsylvania. National Park Service, ., United States. Dept. of the Interior. Southwestern Pennsylvania Heritage Preservation Commission., . (1991). [Denver, Colo.?]: The Service. Accessed on October 8, 2017.
- America's Industrial Heritage: Southwestern Pennsylvania, 1991. Accessed on October 8, 2017.
- Huntingdon County, Pennsylvania: An Inventory of Historic Engineering and Industrial Sites, Historic American Buildings Survey/Historic American Engineering Record, America's Industrial Heritage Project, National Park Service, U.S. Department of the Interior, Washington, D.C., 1991. Accessed on October 8, 2017.
- Recommendations of the Large Industrial Artifact Advisory Panel: America's Industrial Heritage Project, Pennsylvania Accessed on October 8, 2017.
- Comprehensive management plan for the Southwestern Pennsylvania Heritage Preservation Commission, 1992, Dept. of the Interior. Southwestern Pennsylvania Heritage Preservation Commission., National Park Service. Denver Service Center., . (1992). [Denver, Colo.]: U.S. Dept. of the Interior. Accessed on October 8, 2017.
- America's Industrial Heritage Project: seldom seen mine, Southwestern Pennsylvania Heritage Preservation Commission, (1993). [Washington, D.C.?]: U.S. Dept. of the Interior, Southwestern Pennsylvania Heritage Commission, National Park Service Accessed on October 8, 2017.
- Special History Study: The Evolution of Transportation in Western Pennsylvania, 1994 Accessed on October 8, 2017.
- Study of Alternatives: Western Pennsylvania Region: Its Landscape, People, and Industry. 1994 Accessed on October 8, 2017.
- Concept Plan: Southwestern Pennsylvania Industrial Heritage Route. (Bedford, Blair, Cambria, Fayette, Fulton, Huntingdon, Indiana, Somerset, Westmoreland Counties), Pennsylvania. 1994. Accessed on October 8, 2017.

== See also ==
- Westsylvania
