= Pennsylvania Railroad class K4 =

Class of 425 American 4-6-2 locomotives

Pennsylvania Railroad class K4s
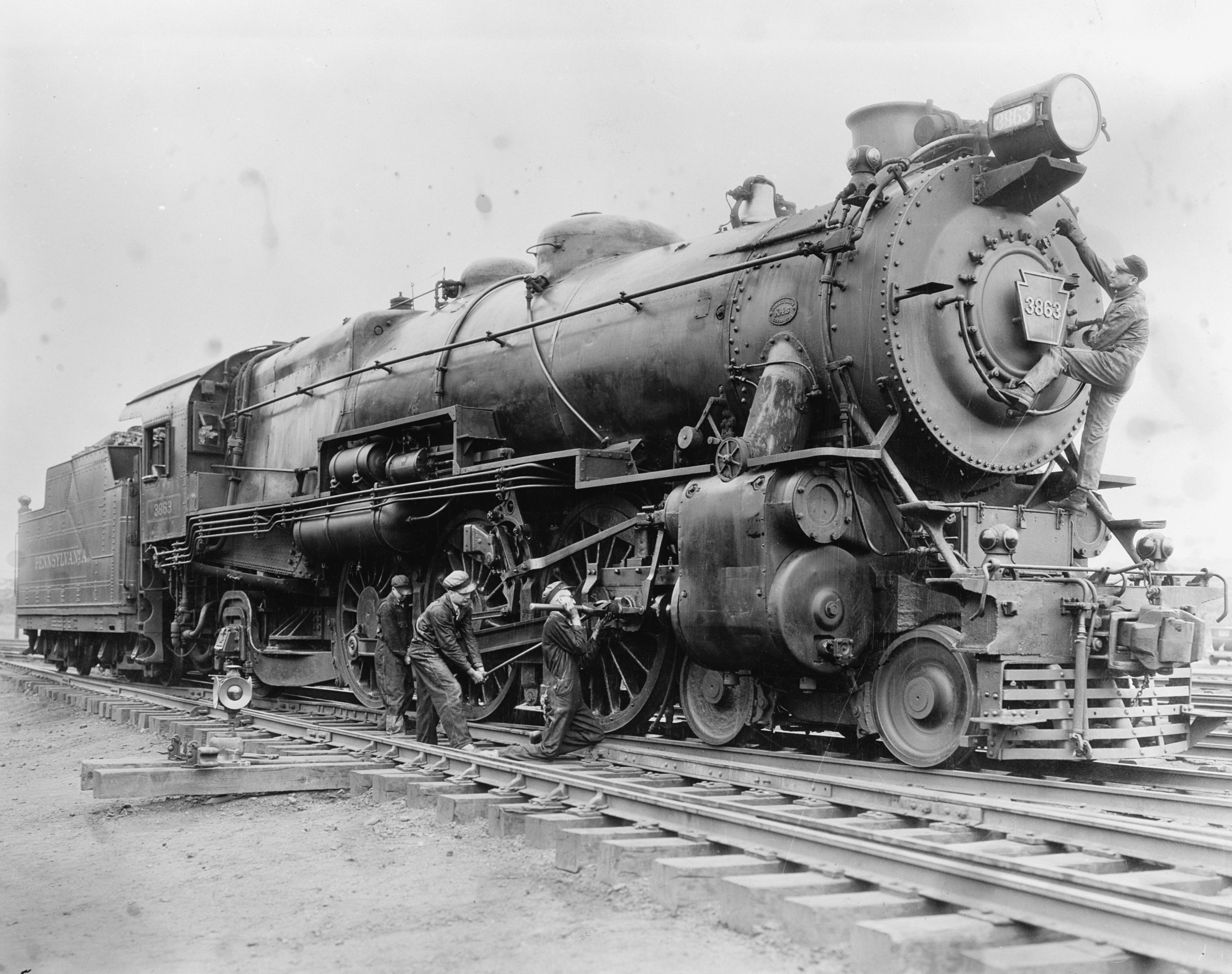
- PRR No. 3863 being inspected and maintained in the 1930s
Type and origin
- Power type: Steam
- Designer: James T. Wallis, Alfred W. Gibbs, and Axel Vogt
- Builder: Juniata Shops (350); Baldwin Locomotive Works (75)
- Build date: 1914-1928
- Total produced: 425
Specifications
- Configuration
  - Whyte: 4-6-2
- Gauge: 4 ft 8 1/2 in (1,435 mm)
- Leading dia.: 36 in (914 mm)
- Driver dia.: 80 in (2,032 mm)
- Trailing dia.: 50 in (1,270 mm)
- Length: 83 ft 6 in (25.45 m)
- Height: 15 ft 0 in (4.57 m)
- Axle load: 66,500 lb (30,200 kg; 30.2 t)
- Adhesive weight: 199,500 lb (90,500 kg; 90.5 t)
- Loco weight: 304,500 lb (138,100 kg; 138.1 t)
- Tender weight: 212,725 lb (96,490 kg; 96.490 t)
- Total weight: 517,225 lb (234,609 kg; 234.609 t)
- Fuel type: Coal
- Fuel capacity: 32,000 lb (15,000 kg; 15 t)
- Water cap.: 7,000 US gal (26,000 L; 5,800 imp gal)
- Firebox
  - Grate area: 69.89 sq ft (6.493 m^{2})
- Boiler: 78 1/2 in (1,994 mm)
- Boiler pressure: 205 psi (1.41 MPa)
- Cylinders: 2
- Cylinder size: 27 in × 28 in (686 mm × 711 mm)
- Valve gear: Walschaerts
- Valve type: Piston valves
Performance figures
- Maximum speed: 87 mph (140 km/h)
- Power output: 3,286 hp (2,450 kW)
- Tractive effort: 44,460 lbf (197.8 kN)
- Factor of adh.: 4.54
Career
- Operators: Pennsylvania Railroad
- Retired: 1938 (1), 1947 (2), 1948-1957
- Disposition: Two preserved, remainder scrapped

The Pennsylvania Railroad K4s was a class of 425 4-6-2 steam locomotives built between 1914 and 1928 for the Pennsylvania Railroad (PRR), where they served as the primary mainline passenger steam locomotives on the entire PRR system until late 1957.

Attempts were made to replace the K4s, including the 4-6-2 K5 (which had more power but the same number of drivers) and the 4-4-4-4 T1 duplex locomotive (which had both more power and more drivers). However, the low factor-of-adhesion of K5 meant that they were limited in their pulling power, while the T1's suffered from greater maintenance costs, wheel slip due to poor springing, and inexperienced crews. The T1's were also introduced late into the lifetime of steam locomotives. As such, the tried and tested K4s held their role as the PRR's primary express passenger locomotives for 30–40 years. The K4s hauled the vast majority of express passenger trains until they were replaced by diesel locomotives.

The K4s were not powerful enough for the heavier trains they often pulled from the mid-1930s onward, so they were often double-headed or even triple-headed, sometimes with early Atlantics and E6s. This was effective but expensive, and several crews were needed. The PRR did have the locomotives needed for this, many having been displaced by electrification east of Harrisburg.

The two preserved K4s, Nos. 1361 and 3750, were designated as Pennsylvania's official state steam locomotives on December 18, 1987, when Pennsylvania Governor Robert P. Casey signed into law House Bill No. 1211.

== History ==
=== Development ===
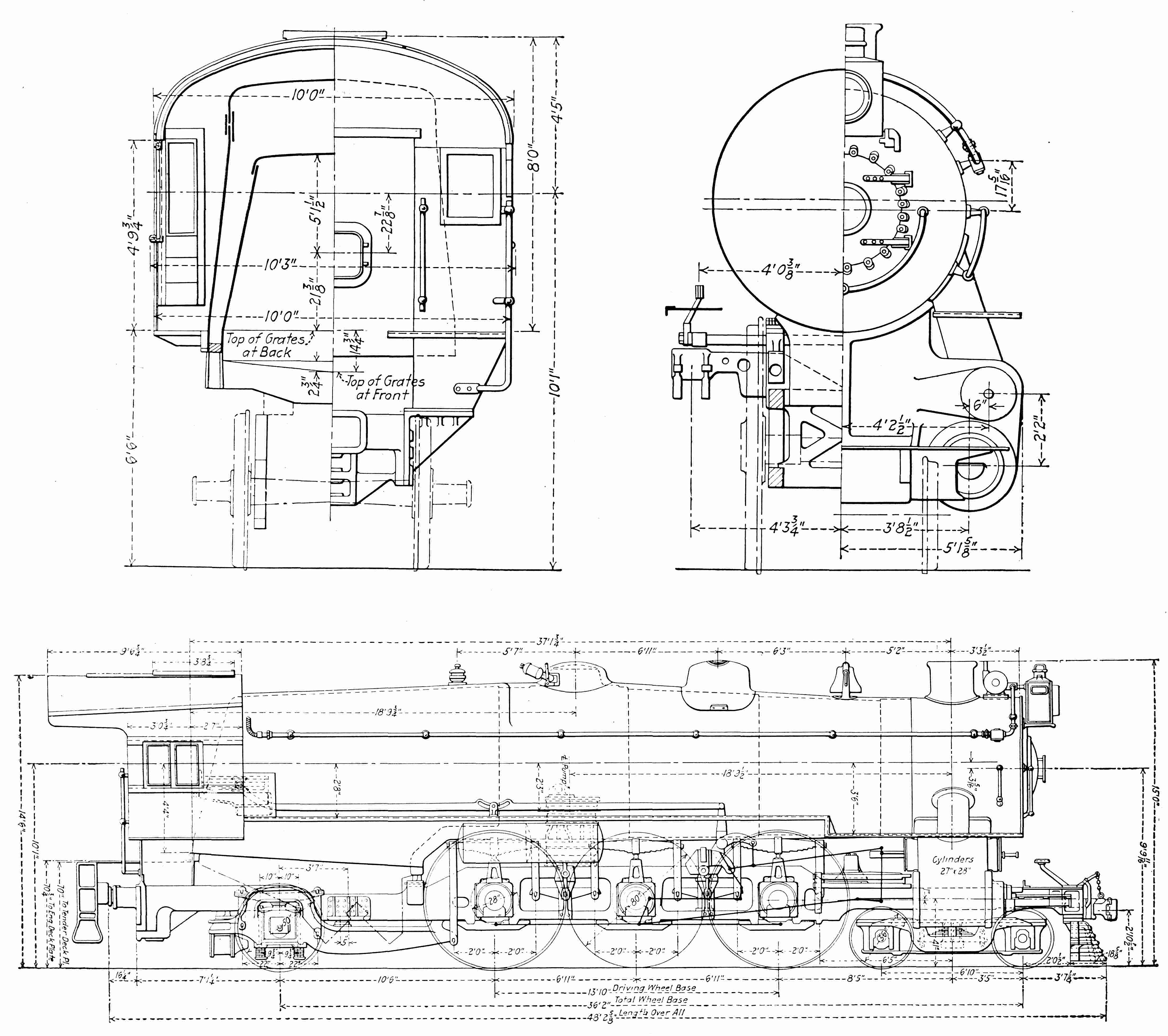
A drawing design of the PRR K4s class locomotive

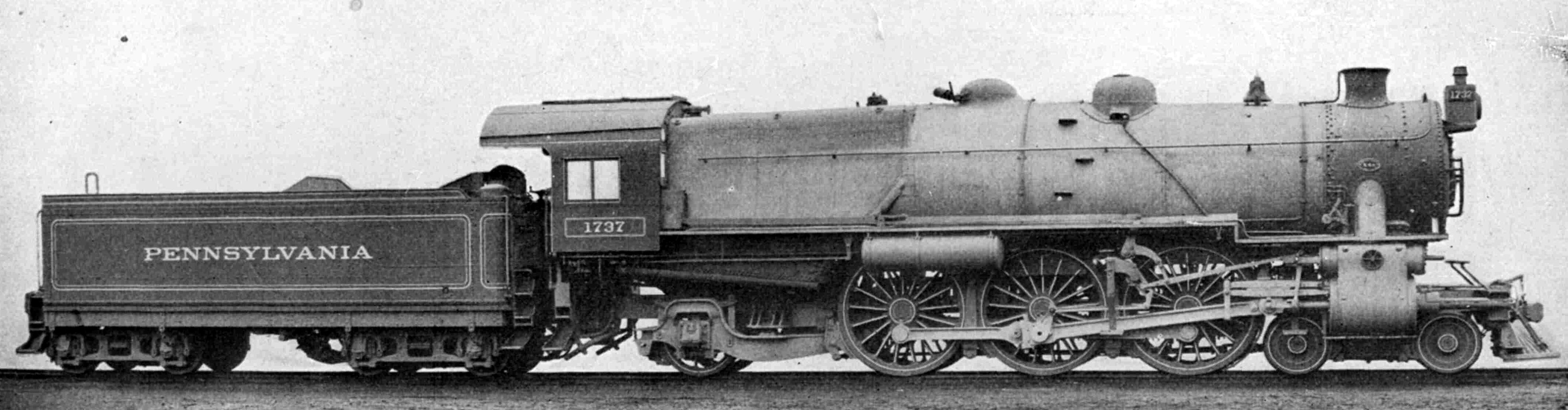
PRR K4s 1737 Builder's Photo

By the 1910s, the Pennsylvania Railroad (PRR) were in need of a larger and heavier passenger locomotive to haul their heavier main line passenger trains on their entire system. The result was the K4s class 4-6-2 Pacific, which was designed under the supervision of PRR Chief of Motive Power James T. Wallis, assisted by Chief Mechanical Engineer Alfred W. Gibbs and Mechanical Engineer Axel Vogt, as one of a pair of classes with the L1s class 2-8-2 Mikado, sharing the same boiler design and other features. Some inspiration came from the large experimental K29 class Pacific built in 1911 by American Locomotive Company (ALCO). Also influential was Gibbs' design for the successful E6s class 4-4-2 Atlantic, from which the K4s class inherited its heat-treated and lightweight machinery, its cast-steel KW trailing truck, and much of its appearance.

No. 1737 was the first K4s class locomotive built in May 1914 at PRR's Juniata Shops in Altoona, Pennsylvania with the construction number 2825. The boiler barrel was bigger than previous classes, and the increase in heating surface and boiler size gave the class good steam-generating capability. No. 1737 was conservative and included a screw reverse (power reverse would soon be added); a small 70-P-70 tender holding only 7,000 US gallons (26,000 L) of water and 12.5 short tons (11.3 t; 11.2 long tons) of coal, set up for hand-firing; a wooden cowcatcher pilot; a square-cased, old-fashioned headlight and piston tailrods (soon to go).

The K4s design was successful enough that it influenced other locomotive designs, and not only those of other PRR locomotives. London and North Eastern Railway Chief Mechanical Engineer Nigel Gresley incorporated much of the boiler design (including the tapered shape) into his famous Class A1 Pacific.

A World War I-era prototype had distinctive "chicken coop" slat pilots, while the postwar versions had modern pilots.

=== Production ===
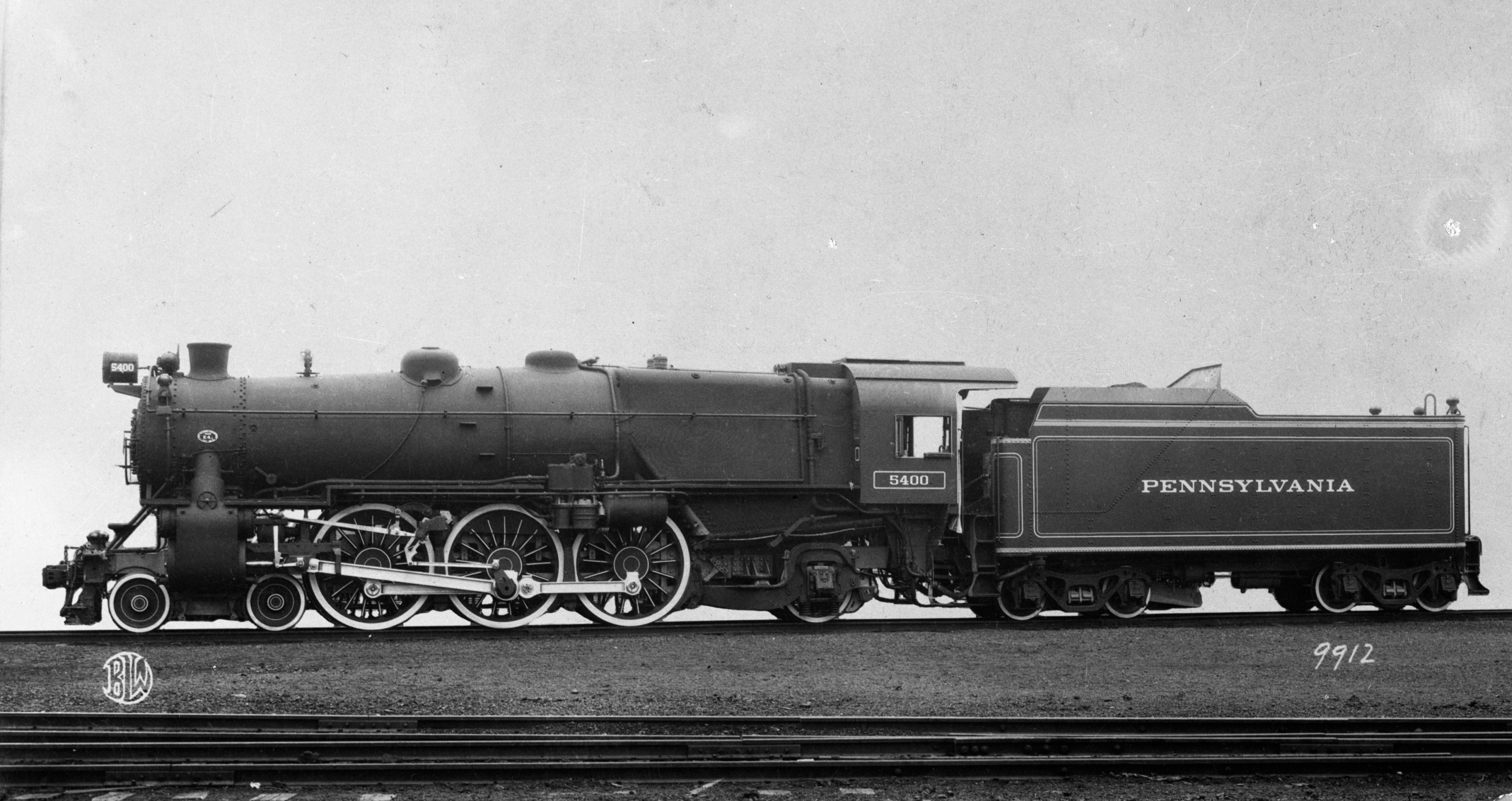
Baldwin builder's photo of Pennsylvania Railroad K4s 5400

Three years elapsed until production examples were built. Partly, this was due to extensive testing, but wartime necessitated priority in construction to the L1s Mikado type for freight. In 1917, Altoona's Juniata Shops started producing K4s in numbers. The first 168 carried widely scattered road numbers, traditional for the PRR, but subsequent locomotives produced after 1920 were numbered in consecutive blocks.

Table of orders and numbers
Year	Quantity	Fleet numbers
1914	1	1737
1917	41	12, 20, 43, 122, 227, 299, 358-359, 383, 389, 422, 612, 623, 669, 719, 830, 920, 1120, 1139, 1188, 1195, 1395, 1453, 1462, 1488, 1497, 2034, 2445, 5022, 5038, 5041, 5058, 5072, 5077, 5086, 5147, 5154, 5238, 5243, 5253, 5296
1918	111	8, 16, 225, 262, 269, 295, 452, 518, 526, 646, 837, 850, 911, 945, 949, 958, 962, 1329–1330, 1339, 1361, 1392, 1433, 1435, 1436, 1517, 1522, 1526, 1531, 1533, 1546, 1551, 1554, 1588, 1653, 1980, 1981, 1983-1985, 2032, 2112, 2665, 2673, 2761, 3654-3655, 3667-3684, 5334-5349, 7053, 7054, 7116, 7133, 7244, 7914, 7938, 8009, 8085, 8157, 8161, 8165, 8181,8195, 8212, 8218, 8225, 8236, 8240, 8242, 8251, 8261, 8278, 8281, 8309, 8334, 8347, 8373, 8377, 8378
1919	15	7267, 7270, 7273-7275, 7278-7280, 7287-7288, 8068, 8108, 8114, 8122, 8137 for PRR Lines West
1920	50	3726–3775
1923	57	3800, 3801, 3805–3807, 3838–3889
1924	50	5350–5399
1927	92	5400–5491
1928	8	5492–5499
	425	Total production

Most of the K-4s were constructed at PRR's Juniata Shops, while Nos. 5400-5474 were built by Baldwin.

=== Modifications ===
The PRR experimented extensively with its K4s fleet, trying out streamlining, poppet valves, smoke deflectors, driving wheel types and others.

==== Streamlining ====
Several K4s locomotives had streamlining applied over the years, to varying degrees. All were later removed, restoring the locomotives to their original appearance.

===== No. 3768 =====
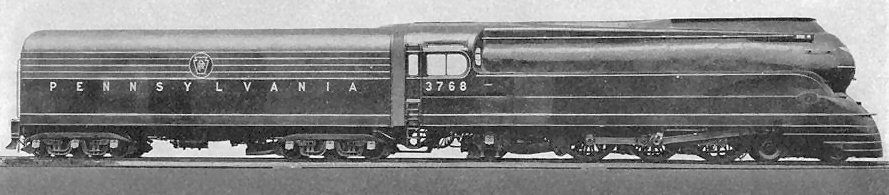
No. 3768 in Raymond Loewy casing.

No. 3768 was clad in a shroud designed by famed industrial designer Raymond Loewy in February 1936. This was a very concealing, enveloping streamlined casing that hid most of the functionality of the steam locomotive, leading to its nickname of "The Torpedo" by train crews. Clay models of Loewy's design streamlined K4s and conventional K4s were tested in a wind tunnel for smoke-lifting ability by Alexander Klemin of the Daniel Guggenheim School of Aeronautics of New York University (CMP). Of 24 variations, 4 were chosen for wind tunnel tests to determine the final design.

At first, the locomotive was not painted in standard Dark Green Locomotive Enamel (DGLE) but instead in a bronze color. It was later refinished in DGLE. A matching tender ran on unusual six-wheel trucks. Like most streamlined steam locomotives, the shrouds impeded maintenance and the covers over the wheels were later removed. For a time, the locomotive was the preferred engine for the Broadway Limited.

===== Nos. 1120, 2665, 3678, and 5338 =====
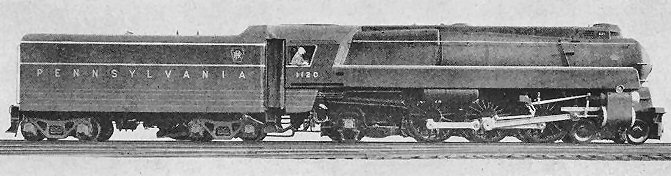
One of the four, No. 1120

These four locomotives were streamlined in 1940 and 1941 with simpler, closer-fitting casings that hid less of the steam locomotives' workings, in that sense, they were similar to Henry Dreyfuss's casings for NYC Hudsons. According to an interview with John W. Epstein, Special Projects Manager and vice president, Raymond Loewy & Assoc., these four streamlined K4s were designed by Raymond Loewy but, due to WWII, there was no publicity about it. Nos. 1120 and 2665 were streamlined in 1940 for the South Wind, a named passenger train equipped and operated jointly by the Pennsylvania Railroad, the Louisville and Nashville Railroad, the Atlantic Coast Line Railroad (later Seaboard Coast Line) and the Florida East Coast Railway. The South Wind began operations in December 1940, providing streamliner service between Chicago, Illinois, and Miami, Florida.

Nos. 3678 and 5338 were streamlined in 1941 for The Jeffersonian, one of the PRR's premier, all-coach trains between New York and St. Louis. They were also seen hauling the Broadway Limited (New York to Chicago), Liberty Limited (Washington to Chicago), and the Trail Blazer (New York to Chicago) occasionally. During World War II, these four locomotives formed a streamlined steam engine fleet within the PRR system, with another five locomotives that were also designed by noted industrial designer Raymond Loewy; they were the PRR S1 No. 6100, Q1 No. 6130, T1 Nos. 6110 and 6111; and K4s No. 3768. Streamlined shrouding of these four K4s Pacific locomotives was removed after 1950, together with K4s No. 3678.

== Accidents and incidents ==
- On Saturday, December 25, 1937, No. 8309 was leading the Gotham Limited from Columbus, Ohio to Pittsburgh, Pennsylvania, with 16 passengers aboard and four porters. On approach into Pittsburgh, at a speed of 40 mph, the locomotive hit a large piece of rock near the West End Bridge and derailed off of a 50-foot cliff onto West Carson Street, killing engineer Oscar E. Rhoads, fireman William H. Strous, and narrowly missing many passing automobiles. All four porters aboard the train were injured. Three more people were indirectly injured when a city bus swerved into two other cars to avoid the falling locomotive. No. 8309 was re-railed, and intended to be towed to a shop to be rebuilt, but upon inspection, it was found that the damage was too great, becoming the first K4s locomotive to be written off for scrap in September 1938.
- On the night of February 18, 1947, Nos. 422 and 3771 were double heading the Red Arrow passenger train No. 68 from Detroit, Michigan, to New York City with fourteen cars behind. At around 3:21 a.m., they both derailed at an excessive speed of 65–70 mph (105–113 km/h) at Bennington Curve in Gallitzin, Pennsylvania, killing 24 people, and injuring 138 on board. Both locomotives were deemed total losses and scrapped two months later.
- On the evening of February 6, 1951, No. 2445 derailed in Woodbridge, New Jersey, with the Broker passenger train No. 733, killing 85 people and injuring 500. The train derailed due to the engineer having trouble looking through the fog along with excessive speed on a temporary trestle due to lack of proper signals. Despite extensive damage, the locomotive was repaired and operated until September 1953.

== Preservation ==
There are only two surviving K4 class locomotives:

=== PRR № 1361 ===
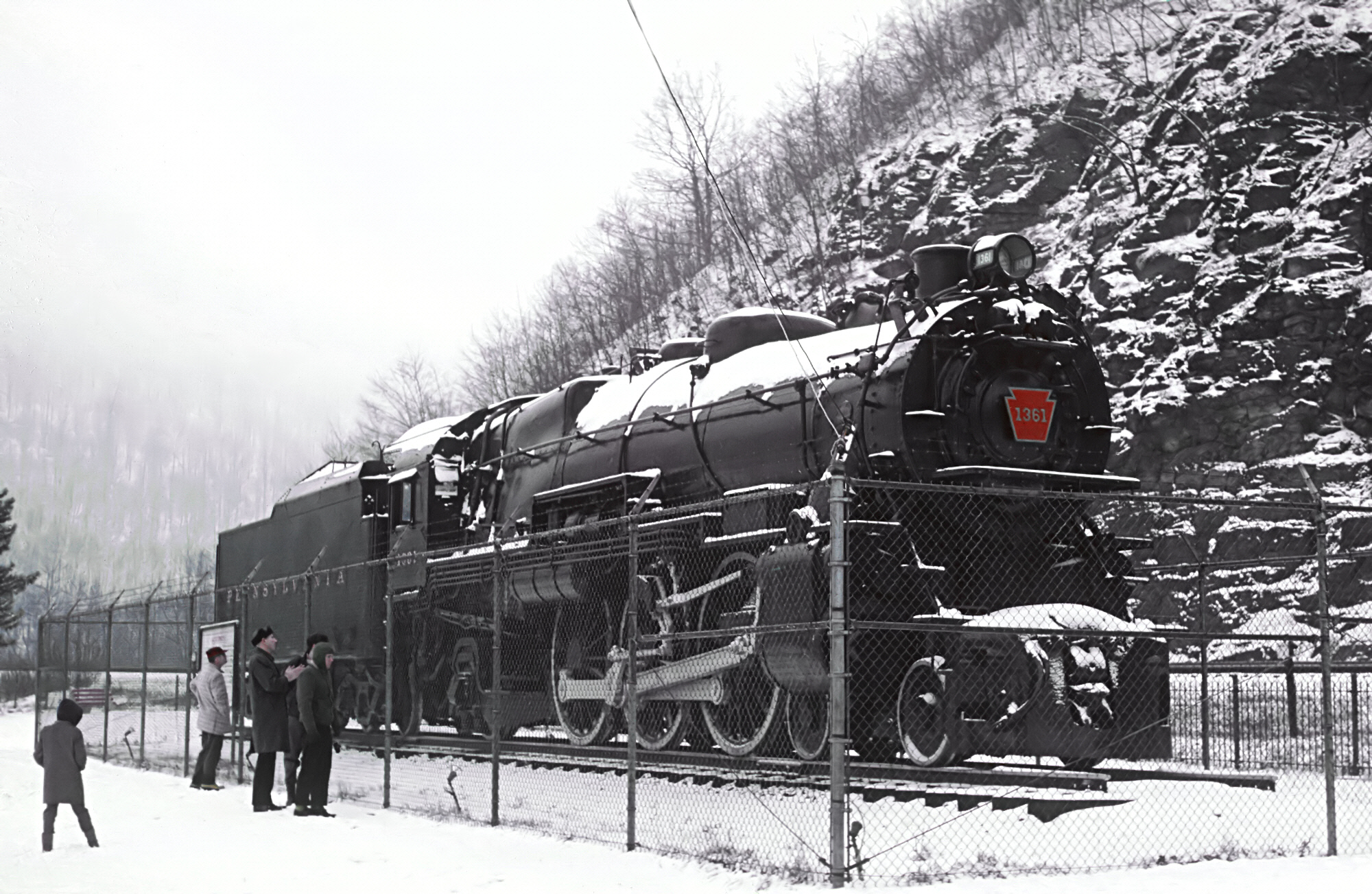
No. 1361 on display at the Horseshoe Curve on February 23, 1969

No. 1361 was being restored to operating condition by the Railroaders Memorial Museum in Altoona in 1987, but persistent bearing problems ended its operation the following year. The locomotive was moved to the Steamtown National Historic Site and the boiler moved to the East Broad Top shops. The disassembled locomotive lay in pieces for 22 years before the project was officially abandoned in 2010. The Museum cited changes in FRA safety standards and new limits to mainline railway access that would make operation impractical. In May 2018, a group of preservationists, engineers and financial backers initiated a new restoration study. The work would include a detailed assessment of the engineering needs and a sustainable operating plan. The group plans to replicate a 1940s Pennsylvania Railroad passenger train. It would work with the state's educators to give rides at tourist railroads within the state to school children on field trips, thus educating them on the history of how the Pennsylvania Railroad shaped their state.

On June 25, 2021, the Railroaders Memorial Museum in Altoona announced that it would launch a complete $2.6 million restoration of #1361. As of December 2022, a new Belpaire firebox was nearing completion, although with thicker steel and other modifications of the 1914 design in order to comply with current federal safety requirements.

=== PRR № 3750 ===
No. 3750 remained on outdoor display at the Railroad Museum of Pennsylvania, outside Strasburg, Pennsylvania. The museum's volunteer group plans to have No. 3750 cosmetically restored prior to it being placed in the newly proposed roundhouse exhibit.

== Bibliography ==
- Pennypacker, Bert; Staufer, Alvin F. (1984). The Many Faces of the Pennsy K-4s. Classic Power (1st ed.). N.J. International Inc. ISBN 0-934088-13-6.
- Staufer, Alvin F. (1962). Pennsy Power: Steam and Electric Locomotives of the Pennsylvania Railroad, 1900-1957 (1st ed.). Standard Print & Publishing. LCCN 62-20878.
