= List of Pennsylvania state symbols =

Location of the Commonwealth of Pennsylvania in the United States of America

The U.S. state of Pennsylvania has 21 official emblems, as designated by the Pennsylvania General Assembly and signed into law by the Governor of Pennsylvania.

== State symbols ==
Type	Symbol	Description	Adopted	Image	Notes
Aircraft	Piper J-3 Cub		June 26, 2014	Piper J-3 Cub	
Amphibian	Eastern hellbender (Cryptobranchus alleganiensis)		April 23, 2019	Eastern hellbender	
Animal	White-tailed deer (Odocoileus virginianus)		October 2, 1959	White-tailed deer	
Beautification and conservation plant	Penngift crownvetch (Coronilla varia L. Penngift)		June 17, 1982		
Beverage	Milk		April 29, 1982	Milk	
Coat of arms	Coat of Arms of Pennsylvania		1778	Coat of Arms of Pennsylvania	
Dog	Great Dane		August 15, 1965	Great Dane	
Electric locomotive	GG1 4859		December 18, 1987	GG1 4859	
Firearm	Pennsylvania long rifle		June 26, 2014	Pennsylvania long rifle	
Fish	Brook trout (Salvelinus fontinalis)		May 9, 1970	Brook trout	
Flag	Flag of Pennsylvania		June 13, 1907	Flag of Pennsylvania	
Flower	Mountain laurel (Kalmia latifolia)		May 5, 1933	Mountain Laurel	
Fossil	Phacops rana		December 5, 1988	Phacops rana	
Game bird	Ruffed Grouse (Bonasa umbellus)		June 22, 1931	Ruffed Grouse	
Insect	Pennsylvania firefly (Photuris pennsylvanica)		December 5, 1988	Pennsylvania Firefly	
Motto	"Virtue, Liberty, and Independence"		1778	Pennsylvania state quarter	
Nickname	"Keystone State"		c. 1800	Keystone	
Seal	Seal of Pennsylvania		1791	Seal of Pennsylvania	
Ship	US Brig Niagara		April 29, 1988	USS Niagara	
Song	"Pennsylvania"		November 29, 1990		
Steam locomotive	K4s 1361 and K4s 3750		December 18, 1987		
Theatre	Walnut Street Theatre		June 8, 1999	Walnut Street Theatre from east	
Tree	Eastern hemlock (Tsuga canadensis linnaeus)		June 23, 1931	Eastern hemlock	

== See also ==
- List of Pennsylvania-related topics
- Lists of United States state insignia
