= Alfred Wolcott Gibbs =

Alfred Wolcott Gibbs (October 27, 1856 – May 19, 1922) was a mechanical engineer in the railroad industry who attained the position of chief mechanical engineer of the Pennsylvania Railroad. He was instrumental in the design of a number of important PRR locomotive classes, including the E6 4-4-2 "Atlantic" type, the K4s 4-6-2 "Pacific" type, and the L1s 2-8-2 "Mikado" type.

== Biography ==
He was born in Fort Fillmore in what is now New Mexico, and died of a heart attack at his home in Wayne, Pennsylvania.

Alfred Gibbs was educated first at Rutgers College (1873–1874) and then at the Stevens Institute of Technology (1874–1878), graduating in mechanical engineering. He joined the Pennsylvania Railroad in 1879 as an apprentice.

Gibbs was appointed General Superintendent of Motive Power of Lines East in 1903, replacing William W. Atterbury.

He was a hereditary member of the Aztec Club of 1847, representing his father General Alfred Gibbs.
