= Axel Vogt =

Axel S. Vogt (January 19, 1849 – November 11, 1921) was the Pennsylvania Railroad's Chief Mechanical Engineer between March 1, 1887, and February 1, 1919. He was succeeded by William Frederic Kiesel, Jr. After retiring from the PRR, Vogt continued to consult for the Baldwin Locomotive Works until his death.

Among his accomplishments was the creation of the world's first static locomotive test facility at the Pennsylvania Railroad's Altoona Works, enabling locomotives to be exhaustively and repeatably tested under load – essentially, a locomotive version of the chassis dynamometer. Under his supervision, the PRR designed and produced many noteworthy steam locomotive designs, such as the E6 Atlantics, K4s Pacifics and L1s Mikados. He was also instrumental in the Pennsylvania's electrification development, although it did not reach full fruition until after his death.

He held many patents in the field of railway engineering.
