= Pennsylvania Railroad 4859 =

Preserved PRR GG1 electric locomotive

Coordinates: 40°15′45″N 76°52′40″W

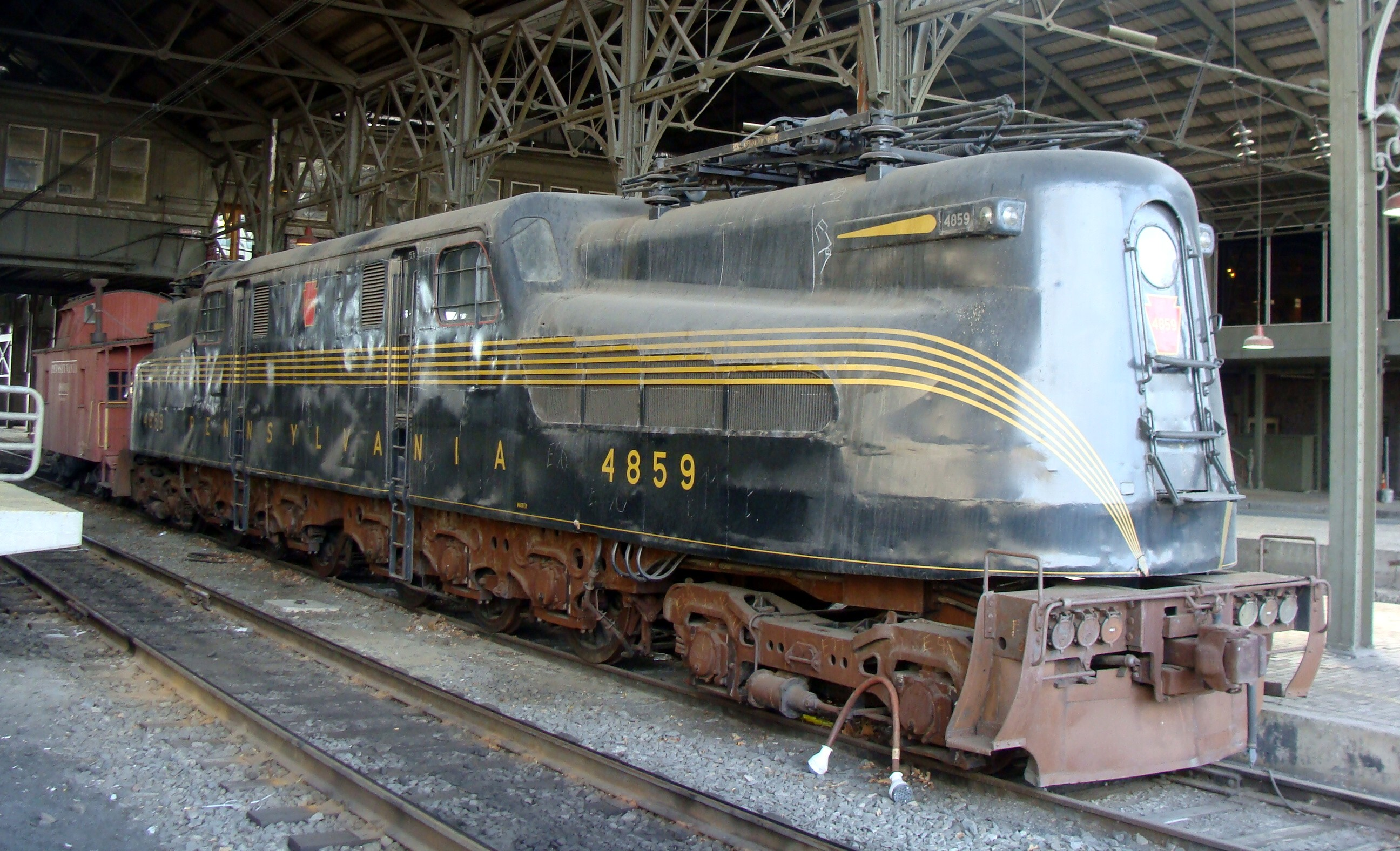
- PRR No. 4859 at the Harrisburg Transportation Center in October 2008
Type and origin
- Power type: Electric
- Builder: Altoona Works
- Build date: December 1937
Specifications
- Configuration
  - AAR: 2-C+C-2
- Gauge: 4 ft 8 1/2 in (1,435 mm)
- Driver dia.: 4 ft 9 in (1,448 mm)
- Length: 79 ft 6 in (24.2 m)
- Width: 10 ft 4 in (3.1 m)
- Height: 15 ft 0 in (4.6 m)
- Loco weight: 477,000 lb (216,000 kg)
- Electric system/s: 11,000 V AC, 25 Hz
- Current pickup: Overhead AC with dual pantographs
Performance figures
- Maximum speed: Passenger: 100 mph (160 km/h); Freight: 90 mph (140 km/h)
- Power output: 4,620 hp (3,450 kW)
Career
- Operators: Pennsylvania Railroad, Penn Central, Conrail
- Class: GG1
- First run: January 15, 1938
- Retired: November 22, 1979
- Restored: August 12–November 15, 1986
- Current owner: Harrisburg Chapter, National Railway Historical Society
- Disposition: On static display
U.S. National Register of Historic Places
- Official name: Electric Locomotive No. 4859
- Designated: August 19, 1982
- Reference no.: 82003797
U.S. National Register of Historic Places
- Official name: Pennsylvania Railroad GG1 Streamlined Electric Locomotive #4859
- Designated: May 5, 2004
- Reference no.: 04000399

Pennsylvania Railroad 4859 is a GG1-class electric locomotive located in the Harrisburg Transportation Center in Harrisburg, the capital of Pennsylvania. It was operated by the Pennsylvania Railroad and its successors, Penn Central and Conrail. 4859 pulled the first electrically powered train from Philadelphia to Harrisburg on January 15, 1938. It was used in various freight and passenger service until November 22, 1979, when it pulled the last GG1-powered freight train on November 22, 1979. Originally located in Strasburg, it was listed to the National Register of Historic Places in 1982 and was moved to its current location in 1986. It was designated the state electric locomotive of Pennsylvania in 1987 by the Pennsylvania General Assembly and was re-listed to the National Register of Historic Places in 2004.

== Background ==
The GG1 was developed in 1930s by General Electric as the replacement for the Pennsylvania Railroad's then standard electric locomotive, the P5a, and was based largely on the New Haven EP3. The GG1 was capable of a top speed of 100 miles per hour (160 km/h), powered by its twelve 385 horsepower (287 kW) traction motors. The prototype GG1, PRR 4800, was tested against Westinghouse's submission, the R1. The Pennsylvania selected the GG1 over the R1, as the R1 was not articulated and the GG1's traction motors were similar to ones already in use. An order for 57 GG1s was placed in November 1934 and the first locomotives were delivered in April 1935.

Raymond Loewy was hired by the Pennsylvania to "enhance the GG1's aesthetics." Loewy had the production locomotives' bodies be welded together, instead of riveted the way 4800 was, to give the GG1 a more streamlined appearance. Loewy also formulated the Brunswick green paint scheme and the gold pinstripes, nicknamed "cat's whiskers", which was eventually applied by the Pennsylvania to all of its locomotives for the next 20 years.

== History ==
4859 was built in December 1937 at the Pennsylvania Railroad's Altoona Works in Altoona, Pennsylvania. The electrified Philadelphia–Harrisburg line was opened on January 15, 1938, with 4859 pulling the inaugural train, Train #25 The Metropolitan. (Note: PRR 4863 is often credited with pulling the inaugural train due to a mislabeling of an original print. 4863 actually had pulled the first westbound train to Philadelphia, departing an hour after 4859 had arrived in Harrisburg. This mistake is also repeated in Bezilla's Electric Traction on the Pennsylvania Railroad, 1895–1968.) Its departure from Philadelphia was accompanied by a cacophony of various train whistles and fire sirens leading some residents, who were unaware of the event, to believe that Nazi Germany was invading.

4859 was regeared to have a top speed of 90 miles per hour (140 km/h) when it was shifted to freight duty in 1964. Although used primarily for freight, 4859 continued to pull "Clockers", short-haul passenger trains from New York to Philadelphia, and commuter trains on the New York and Long Branch Railroad. 4859, accompanied by PRR 4887, pulled the last freight train to be powered by a GG1 from the Enola Yard in Enola, Pennsylvania, to Edgemoor, Delaware, before being retired by Conrail on November 29, 1979.

=== Preservation ===
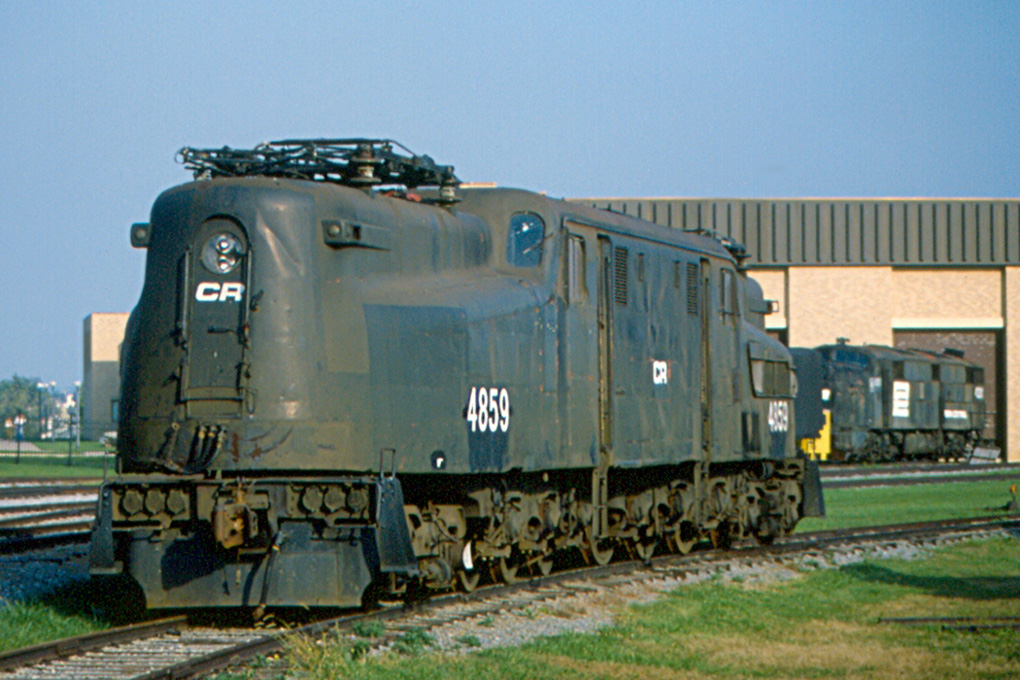
4859 still in the patched Conrail livery at the Railroad Museum in 1982.

After its retirement, 4859 was purchased for $13,000 by the Harrisburg chapter of the National Railroad Historical Society and donated to the Harrisburg Redevelopment Authority. It was sent to the Railroad Museum of Pennsylvania in Strasburg in the early 1980s, where restoration of 4859 was carried by the workshops of the nearby Strasburg Rail Road. The body and chassis were sandblasted, primed and repainted back to its original 1938 appearance. The main transformer was removed and drained of the hazardous polychlorinated biphenyl (PCB) used as coolant.

4859 was listed on the National Register of Historic Places on August 19, 1982, while still in Strasburg. The deed to 4859 was transferred from Redevelopment Authority to the Pennsylvania Historical and Museum Commission on November 13, 1986. Two days later, the engine was moved into the Transportation Center and rededicated. The Pennsylvania General Assembly designated 4859 the official state electric locomotive on December 18, 1987, while also designating two K4s locomotives as the state steam locomotives in the same bill. 4859 was listed on National Register of Historic Places for a second time on May 5, 2004. "Soft" materials, like insulation, were removed from the cab in 2005 on orders from the United States Environmental Protection Agency to remove residual contamination from the PCBs. In 2010, 4859 received some cosmetic restoration of its truck assemblies which were re-painted black to eliminate a noticeable coating of rust. On April 5, 2014, the locomotive and its caboose were temporarily moved west of the Transportation Center, approximately 1,000 feet (300 m), to a siding, and covered with tarpaulins to allow Amtrak to perform renovation work on the station's catenary, signals, switches and tracks. By October 17, 2015, the renovations were complete enough to allow 4859 to return to the station, though the project overall remains in progress.

== See also ==
- List of Pennsylvania state symbols
- National Register of Historic Places listings in Dauphin County, Pennsylvania
