= Pennsylvania Railroad 4876 =

GG1-class electric locomotive

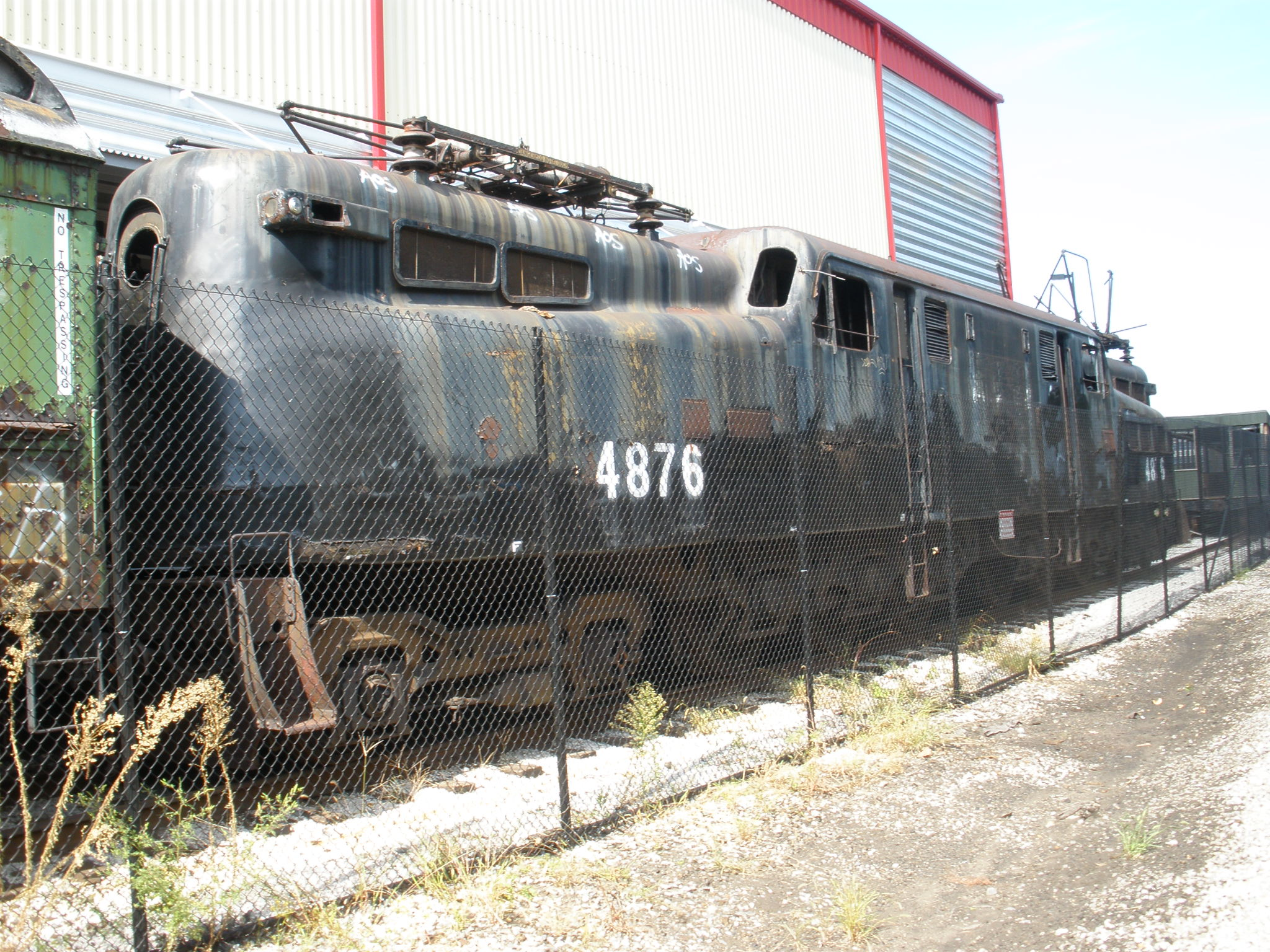
- Reconstructed 4876 at the National Museum of Railroad History & Innovation in August 2008
Type and origin
- Power type: Electric
- Builder: Altoona Works
- Serial number: 4345
- Build date: January 1939
Specifications
- Configuration
  - AAR: 2-C+C-2
- Gauge: 4 ft 8 1/2 in (1,435 mm)
- Driver dia.: 4 ft 9 in (1,448 mm)
- Length: 79 ft 6 in (24.23 m)
- Width: 10 ft 4 in (3.15 m)
- Height: 15 ft 0 in (4.57 m) over locked-down pantographs
- Loco weight: 477,000 lb (216,000 kg)
- Electric system/s: 11,000 V AC, 25 Hz
- Current pickup: Overhead AC with dual pantographs
Performance figures
- Maximum speed: 100 mph (160 km/h) (passenger); 90 mph (140 km/h) (freight)
- Power output: 4,620 hp (3,450 kW)
Career
- Operators: Pennsylvania Railroad, Penn Central, Conrail, New Jersey Transit
- Class: GG1
- Retired: 1983
- Current owner: National Museum of Railroad History & Innovation
- Disposition: In storage

Pennsylvania Railroad 4876 is a GG1-class electric locomotive built in January 1939 at the PRR's Altoona Works in Altoona, Pennsylvania, United States. It is best known for being involved in an accident on January 15, 1953, when the locomotive overran a buffer stop, crashed into the concourse of Union Station in Washington, D.C., and fell partway into the basement after the train's brakes failed. Due to the major crowds expected for the upcoming inauguration of Dwight D. Eisenhower, 4876 was lowered the rest of the way into the basement and a temporary floor was erected overhead. After the inauguration, the locomotive's frame and superstructure was essentially scrapped on site, with all the reusable components shipped back to Altoona, Pennsylvania, to reconstruct a replacement 4876, which operated for another 30 years.

== Background ==
The GG1 was developed in the 1930s by General Electric as the replacement for the Pennsylvania Railroad's then standard electric locomotive, the P5a, and was based largely on the New Haven EP3. The GG1 was capable of a top speed of 100 miles per hour (160 km/h), powered by its twelve 385 horsepower (287 kW) traction motors. The prototype GG1, #4800, was tested against Westinghouse's submission, the R1 . The Pennsylvania selected the GG1 over the R1, as the R1 was not articulated and the GG1's traction motors were similar to ones already in use. An order for the first 57 of a total 139 GG1s was placed in November 1934, with delivery starting in April 1935.

== History ==
#4876 was built in 1939 at the Pennsylvania Railroad's Altoona Works in Altoona, Pennsylvania, and was the 77th locomotive in its class. It operated between New York City and Washington, D.C., on the electrified Northeast Corridor as well as Philadelphia to Harrisburg on the PRR's Main Line.

=== Accident ===
At 8:38 AM on the morning of January 15, 1953, #4876 was the subject of a wreck while pulling the southbound Federal #173 from Boston, Massachusetts, to Washington, D.C. Upon nearing an "Approach" signal about 1 mile (1.6 km) outside of Washington, the engineer applied the brakes to slow the train down from 70 to 60 miles per hour (113 to 97 km/h). Noting that the train still was not slowing after passing the signal, the engineer engaged the emergency brake and sounded the locomotive's horn. An assistant train director in Interlocking Tower 'C' observed the excessive speed of #4876 and radioed ahead to K Tower. The train director in K Tower already had the switches changed to allow #4876 to enter Union Station on Track 16, its regularly assigned track. Having insufficient time to switch the runaway on to another track, the director alerted the station master's office, situated at the end of Track 16. The #4876 rammed the buffer stop, still traveling at around 35 to 40 miles per hour (56 to 64 km/h), and continued into the concourse of Union Station, before partially falling through the floor into the baggage room below.

An investigation by the Interstate Commerce Commission discovered a design flaw in the passenger car used by the New York, New Haven and Hartford Railroad. If the handle of an angle cock came into contact with the bottom crossmember of the car's coupler pocket, the angle cock could inadvertently close, rendering the brakes on any trailing cars inoperable. The third car on the train, New Haven passenger coach #8665, exhibited this design flaw. The fourth car was not of the same design and had a different style of coupler. The difference between the two couplers increased the frequency and the intensity at which the angle cock would hit the crossmember. On the morning of the day the accident occurred, the train had already reportedly stopped outside of Kingston, Rhode Island due to the brakes on the final two cars "sticking". Upon inspection, the angle cock on car #8655 was found to be closed and was reopened by the engineer. Later along the route, the locomotive changed crews. During the change, the previous failed to pass the issue onto the following crew and the matter was forgotten, leading to a repeat angle cock closure and the eventual crash of the train.

With the inauguration of Dwight D. Eisenhower set to occur on January 20, the passenger cars were re-railed and #4876 was lowered the rest of the way into the baggage room. A temporary floor was erected over the locomotive so as to not impede the crowds traveling to Washington, D.C., for the inauguration.

=== Rebuilding ===
After the crash, it was widely believed that after the presidential inauguration, #4876 was cut into three sections, hoisted out of the baggage room and reassembled in the Altoona shops. Since-published PRR documentation on the damage has surfaced that reveals the superstructure and frame were mostly scrapped in place. Wreck cranes were not able to penetrate deep enough into the station concourse to lift out sections of the engine that large. The GG1 had to be cut into much smaller pieces so that they could be hauled up the baggage ramp and placed into gondola cars for the trip to Altoona. The PRR determined it was less expensive to reassemble #4876 than to write it off and replace it with a completely new locomotive (which would have cost three times as much). Structurally, the majority of the locomotive was beyond repair. Many self-contained components, such as the traction motors, wheels, axles, bearings and brake cylinders etc. were able to be reused. Parts of the driving truck frames, the main cab underframe, the carbody superstructure, pantographs, and couplers had to be newly built. By the following October, a like-new #4876 was released for service, outshopped in Tuscan red rather than the previous Dark Green Locomotive Enamel (DGLE).

=== Remaining service and preservation ===
The reconstructed #4876 was returned to DGLE, single stripe by 1956. It remained in service for approximately 30 more years with the PRR, Penn Central, Conrail and finally New Jersey Transit. In 1983, the locomotive was retired and donated for preservation. Originally slated for donation to the Smithsonian Institution, it was ultimately donated to the B&O Railroad Museum in Baltimore, Maryland. Originally, the museum planned on cosmetically restoring #4876 and putting it on static display. These plans were placed on hold indefinitely when the museum's roundhouse roof collapsed in 2003, and the museum focused its efforts on restoring the equipment damaged by the collapse. The locomotive has been stored outside since it was acquired by the museum. It has become defaced with graffiti and parts of its steel body have corroded.

== See also ==
- List of rail accidents (1950–1999)

== Sources ==
- "Ex Parte No. 184, Accident at Union Station, Washington D.C." (PDF). Interstate Commerce Commission. February 17, 1953. Archived from the original (PDF) on August 23, 2011.
- Bezilla, Michael (1980). Electric Traction on the Pennsylvania Railroad, 1895–1968. University Park: Penn State University Press. ISBN 978-0271002415. OCLC 5336721.
- Loftus, Joseph A (January 16, 1953). "Runaway Train Rams Station In Washington, Injuring 41". The New York Times. pp. 1, 16.
- Stauffer, Alvin W (1962). Pennsy Power. Carrollton, Ohio: Standard Print & Publishing. LCCN 62020878.
