= 1953 Pennsylvania Railroad train wreck =

Train wreck in Washington, D.C.

- Wreckage of the train

Details
- Date: January 15, 1953; 73 years ago 8:38 a.m.
- Location: Union Station, Washington, D.C.
- Coordinates: 38.8988°N 77.0061°W
- Country: United States
- Line: Washington Union Terminal
- Operator: Pennsylvania Railroad
- Incident type: Overrun
- Cause: Braking failure

Statistics
- Trains: 1
- Passengers: 400
- Deaths: 0
- Injured: 43

The 1953 Pennsylvania Railroad train wreck occurred on January 15, 1953, when a passenger and mail train from Boston to Washington DC (the Federal) failed to brake sufficiently on its approach to Union Station, Washington, jumping the platform and plunging through the floor of the concourse. There were no deaths, but 43 people were injured.

The cause of the accident was a design flaw that allowed an air brake valve to close without human intervention.

== Description of the accident ==
The Federal (No. 173), was a southbound, Boston-to-Washington, D.C., overnight train carrying mail and passengers. When the train arrived in New Haven, a New Haven electric locomotive replaced the diesel along with adding several passenger cars from Springfield for the run to New York's Penn Station where PRR GG1 No. 4876, an electric locomotive, was coupled on; the train had 16 coaches and Pullman sleeping cars.

The Federal departed Boston at 11:00 p.m. After making two stops, the train halted at Kingston, Rhode Island, about 70 miles (110 km) south of Boston. Its brakes were sticking, and a 45-minute inspection occurred. Conductors discovered a closed "angle cock" (an air shutoff valve) at the rear of the third car. The air brake system aboard the rail cars had angle cocks at both ends of each car. Both valves had to be open for the air brake system to operate properly. The only closed angle cocks should have been on the front of the locomotive and at the rear of the final car.

Air brakes on trains are powered by a compressed air reservoir aboard each car. The engine supplies air pressure that is supposed to flow through the airbrake system along the entire length of the train. When this pressure is reduced by the engineer, valves on each car cause compressed air from the car's own reservoir to flow into the car's brake cylinder which applies brake shoes against the wheels and slows down the train. If the cars separate or the air pressure is "dumped" by the engineer in an emergency, the pressure immediately drops to zero and all cars in the train will brake to an emergency stop as a fail safe. Closing an angle cock at any point along the system disables this fail-safe and prevents the reduction in air pressure from being able to apply any brakes behind the closed angle cock.

A routine inspection during the train's stop in New York City, inspectors later said, found the angle cock in the correct, open position. But an after-accident investigation by the ICC revealed that the handle of the angle cock at the rear of the third coach was not in the correct position, as a design flaw on New Haven coach #8665 allowed the handle of the angle cock valve to come into contact with the coupler, causing the valve to close. This meant that the engine could only activate the braking power of the first three coaches.

The Federal departed New York City at 4:38 a.m. It made its regularly scheduled stops at Philadelphia; Wilmington, Delaware; and Baltimore. No braking trouble was reported at these stops. It departed Baltimore at 7:50 a.m.

Baltimore was the train's last stop before arriving at Union Station, its final destination. After leaving Baltimore, the train accelerated to 80 miles per hour (130 km/h), its normal speed. As the train neared Landover, Maryland, engineer Henry W. Brower tried to slow the train for its approach into the stub-ended tracks of Washington but the train only slowed to 60 miles per hour (97 km/h). Brower activated the emergency brakes, but the train only slowed to 50 miles per hour (80 km/h). Brower then attempted to "plug" the locomotive (put it into reverse while still moving forward), a highly unusual emergency procedure, but the locomotive began malfunctioning due to the stress placed on it. Sparks began flying from the locomotive’s wheels and first three coaches as they alone tried to slow the train.

The Federal now began descending a 5,500-foot (1,700 m) long section of track on a relatively steep 0.73 percent grade, causing the train to accelerate. Realizing his train had become a runaway, Brower began sounding a distress signal on the engine's air horn.

In the train yard at Union Station, tower operator John Feeney in K Tower set the switches to route the Federal onto Track 16. When the train raced past him at high speed with its horn blaring, he telephoned the stationmaster's office. Clerk Ray Klopp picked up the phone. Feeney shouted, "Runaway on Track 16!" Klopp looked up to see the train racing directly toward his office and shouted, "Run for your lives!" Then he and the other clerks ran out of the office as fast as they could. (They had just 20 seconds to get out of harm's way.) Aboard the train, conductor Thomas J. Murphy ran through the train from end to end, shouting at the passengers to get down as low as they could on the floor or on their seats.

=== The wreck ===
Passengers aboard the train knew something was wrong. The train would normally be moving very slowly as it passed beneath Florida Avenue. But this time it rushed past the bridge.

The Federal was still moving at about 45 miles per hour (72 km/h) when it was 1,000 feet (300 m) from the terminal. It had only slowed to 35 miles per hour (56 km/h) when it struck the buffer stop (the steel barrier at the end of the track). The train crashed through the buffer stop, the stationmaster's office, and then demolished a newsstand. The locomotive began skidding to its right. It also destroyed a steel pillar in the concourse, and tore through the concourse's concrete floor (which was 6 inches (15 cm) higher than the tracks outside).

The floor, not designed to hold the weight of a train, gave way beneath the massive 475,000 lb (215.5-tonne) GG1 electric locomotive, its rear plunging into the baggage and mail rooms in the basement below.

Two coaches came loose from the locomotive and the rest of the train. One of them slid onto the concourse to the right of the engine, coming to rest almost abreast of it. The other nosed downward behind the locomotive into the gigantic hole in the concourse floor. Six more coach cars jumped the tracks behind the train.

The locomotive was just inches from smashing into the crowded waiting room beyond the concourse. A Life magazine photo showed its nose just pushing open the doors to the waiting room.

No one died during the accident. Forty-three people were injured, six seriously enough to require overnight hospitalization. Most of the workers in the basement had just departed for their coffee break, which spared their lives. Four Union Station workers were briefly trapped in the wreckage, but quickly extricated. The engineer had no injuries, and the fireman received only scratches. Both men climbed out of the GG1 under their own power.

The stationmaster's clock, which was found in the wreckage, showed the time frozen at 8:38 a.m.

== Aftermath ==
NBC News was able to broadcast live from Union Station just 67 minutes after the wreck occurred. This was, for the time, one of the fastest live nationwide broadcasts ever made.

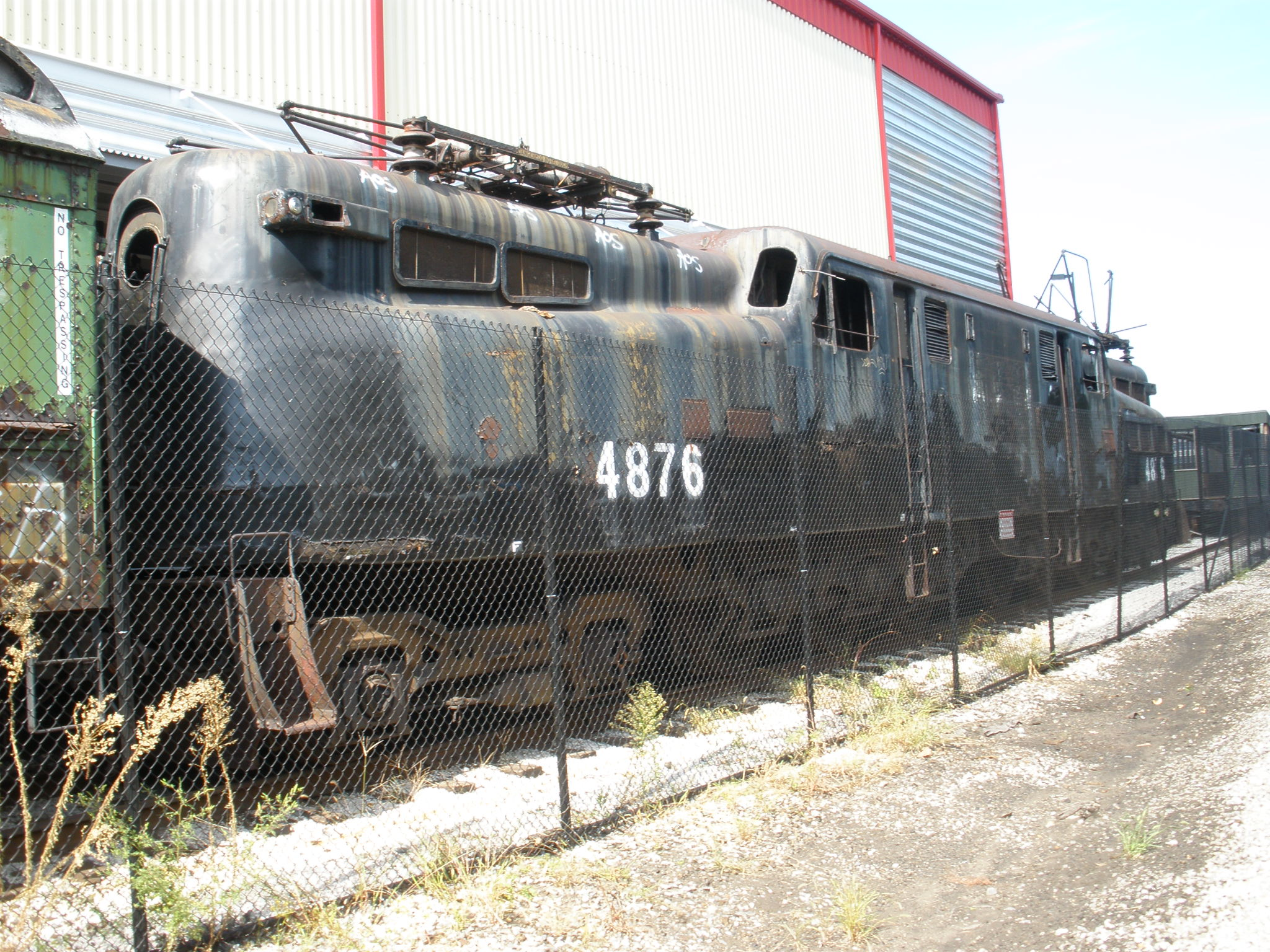
PRR 4876 preserved at Baltimore Railroad Museum

Despite the extensive damage to Union Station, train service to and from D.C. was delayed but not canceled. The railroad called in a local contractor, Steiner Construction Co. of Baltimore to assess the damage and make temporary repairs. As the incident occurred just five days before the inauguration of Dwight D. Eisenhower as the 34th President of the United States, it was decided to make temporary repairs to accommodate the expected crowds. Working round the clock, the derailed cars were removed, the engine lowered into the basement, and Steiner Construction erected a temporary wooden floor over the hole in the concourse and covered it with quick-drying asphalt in just two days. The workers also built a temporary station master's office and newsstand in time for the crowds coming in to DC. PRR #4876 was later cut up on site, with the pieces hauled up the baggage ramp into gondola cars to be shipped back to the Pennsylvania Railroad's main shop complex in Altoona, Pennsylvania. After new frames were ordered and a replacement superstructure fabricated, any components that were able to be reused went towards what was essentially a new 4876 that remained in service for another 30 years. Having been retired in 1983, 4876 is currently in storage at the Baltimore & Ohio Railroad Museum in Baltimore with no current plans for restoration.

The wreck of the Federal later inspired a similar scene in the 1976 motion picture Silver Streak.

== Bibliography ==
- Abendschein, Frederic H. (April 23, 1983). "Pennsylvania Railroad Electric Locomotive GG1 4800" (PDF). American Society of Mechanical Engineers. Archived from the original (PDF) on April 7, 2014.
- Bibel, G.D. (2012). Train Wreck: The Forensics of Rail Disasters. Baltimore: Johns Hopkins University Press.
- Cooper, Rachel (2011). Union Station in Washington, D.C. Charleston, S.C.: Arcadia Publishing.
- Interstate Commerce Commission (February 17, 1953). Ex Parte No. 184, Accident at Union Station, Washington D.C. – via Bureau of Transportation Statistics Repository & Open Science Access Portal.
- Solomon, Brian (2003). Electric Locomotives. St. Paul, Minn.: MBI Publishing.
