= DD2 =

DD2 could refer to:

- DD 2 or DD Metro, a former Indian public TV channel
- Dhilluku Dhuddu 2, a 2019 Indian horror comedy film
- Destruction Derby 2, a 1996 video game
- Double Dragon II: The Revenge, a 1988 arcade game
- Dragon's Dogma 2, a 2024 video game by Capcom
- DD2 Electronics, an electronic store in Honduras
- DD2, a postcode district in the DD postcode area (Dundee postcode area), part of a group of eleven postcode districts in eastern Scotland
- PRR DD2 (Pennsylvania Railroad class DD2), a single prototype electric locomotive built in 1938
- Rotax Max DD2, an engine configuration designed by Rotax and used in kart racing
