= National Museum of Railroad History & Innovation =

Historic train museum in Baltimore, Maryland, U.S.

- Baltimore and Ohio Railroad Museum and Mount Clare Station
- U.S. National Register of Historic Places
- U.S. National Historic Landmark
- Baltimore City Landmark
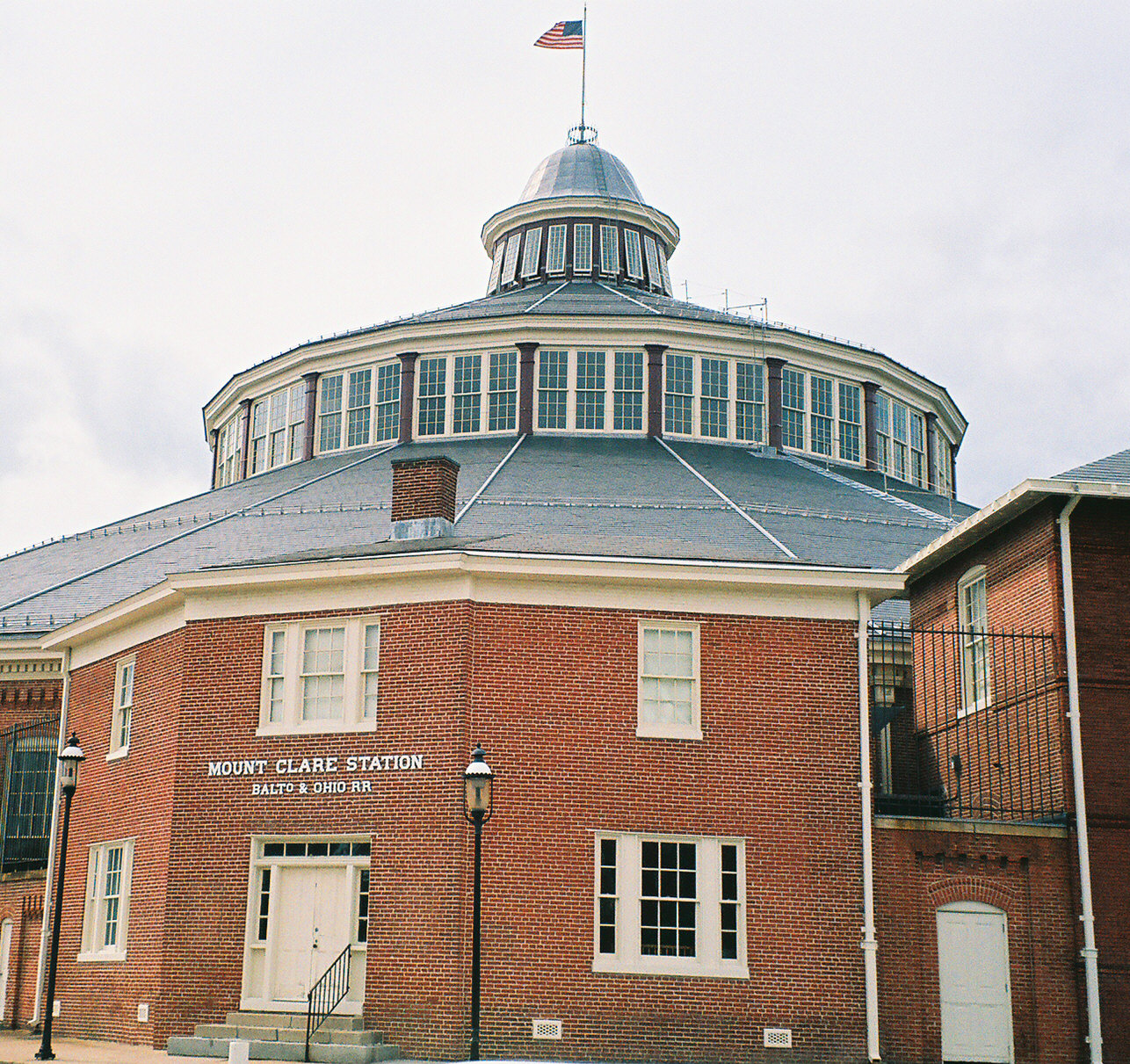
- Exterior view of the Mount Clare Station and roundhouse (September 2008)

- Location within Baltimore Location within Maryland Location within the United States
- Location: 901 West Pratt Street; Baltimore, Maryland, U.S.
- Coordinates: 39°17′7.42″N 76°37′56.63″W
- Built: 1829 (original site); 1851 (current station structure); 1884 (roundhouse)
- Architect: Ephraim Francis Baldwin
- Architectural style: Georgian
- Website: https://www.nationalrailroad.org/
- NRHP reference No.: 66000906

Significant dates
- Added to NRHP: October 15, 1966
- Designated NHL: September 15, 1961
- Designated BCL: 1975

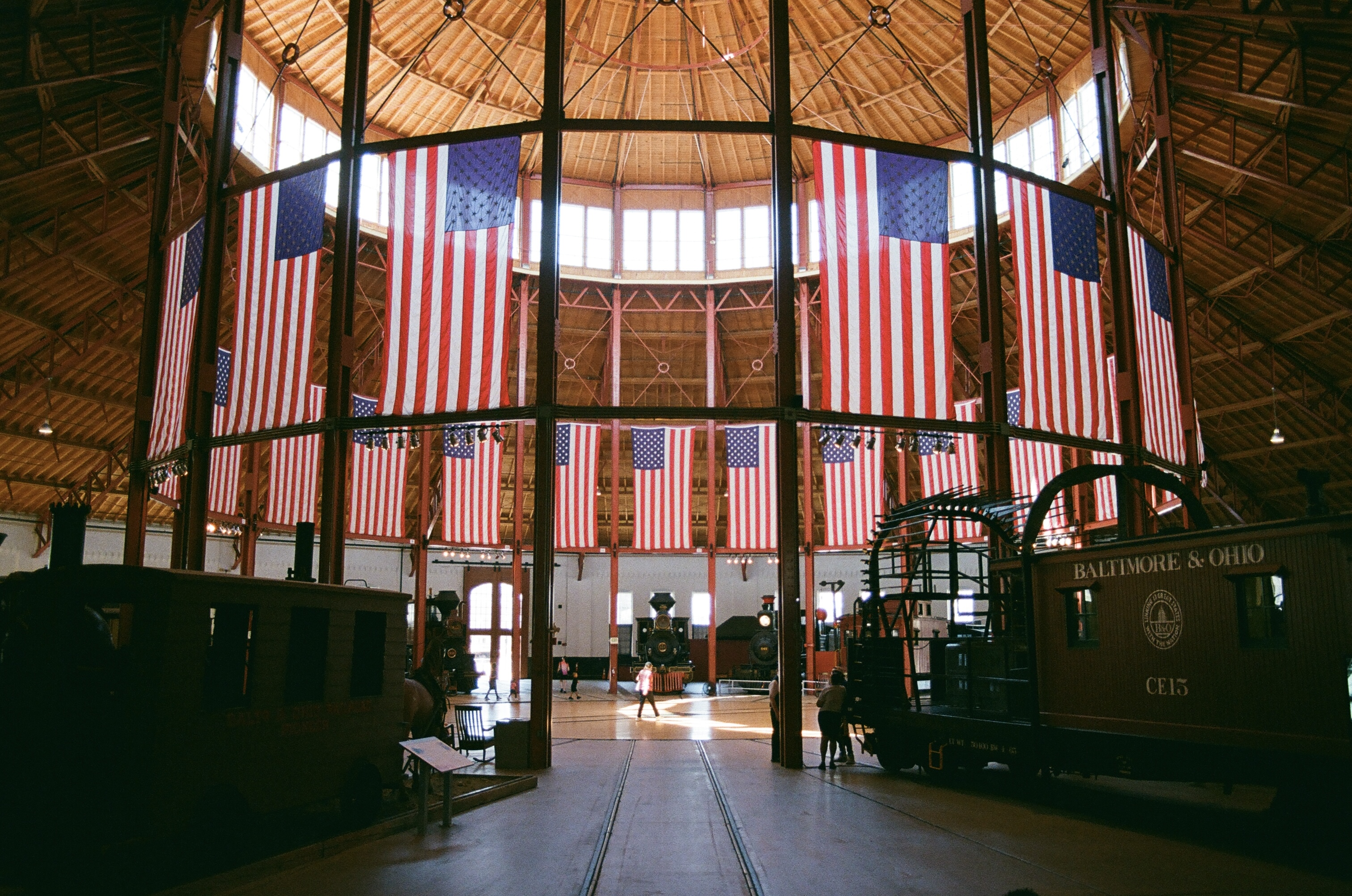
The roundhouse (July 2025)

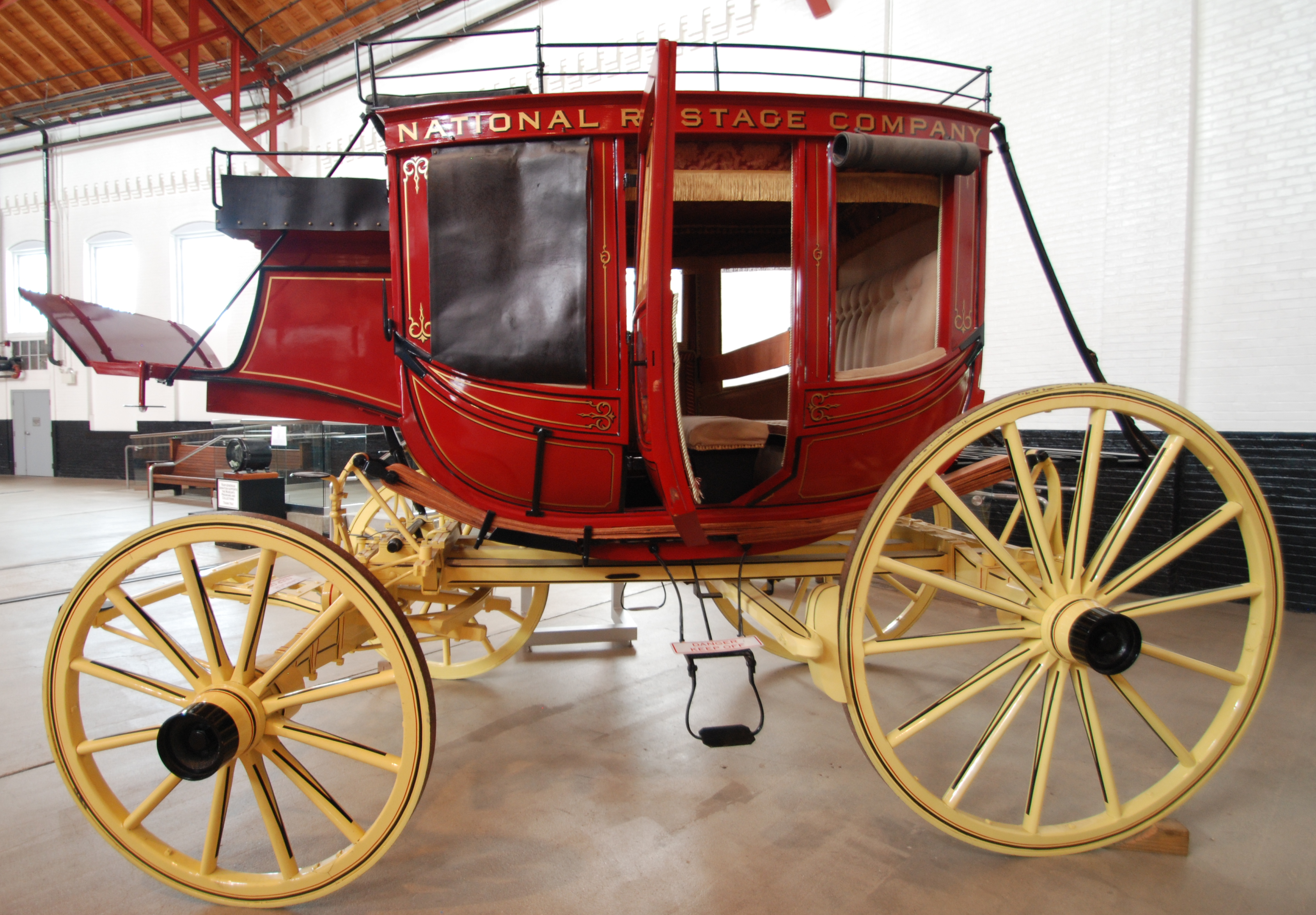
Replica Concord style stage coach

The National Museum of Railroad History & Innovation (formerly and still often referred to as the B&O Railroad Museum) is a museum and historic railway station exhibiting historic railroad equipment in Baltimore, Maryland. The Baltimore and Ohio Railroad (B&O) company originally opened the museum on July 4, 1953, with the name of the Baltimore & Ohio Transportation Museum. It has been called one of the most significant collections of railroad treasures in the world and has the largest collection of 19th-century locomotives in the U.S. The museum is located in the Baltimore and Ohio Railroad's old Mount Clare Station and adjacent roundhouse, and retains 40 acres of the B&O's sprawling Mount Clare Shops site, which is where, in 1829, the B&O began America's first railroad and is the oldest railroad manufacturing complex in the United States.

Mount Clare is considered to be a birthplace of American railroading, as the site of the first regular railroad passenger service in the U.S., beginning on May 22, 1830. It was also to this site that the first telegraph message, "What hath God wrought?" was sent on May 24, 1844, from Washington, D.C., using Samuel Morse's electric telegraph.

The museum houses collections of 19th- and 20th-century artifacts related to America's railroads. The collection includes 250 pieces of railroad rolling stock, 15,000 artifacts, 5,000 cubic feet (140 m^{3}) of archival material, four significant 19th-century buildings, including the historic roundhouse, and a mile of track, considered the most historic mile of railroad track in the United States. Train rides are offered on the mile of track on Wednesday through Sunday from April through December and on weekends in January. In 2002, the museum had 160,000 visitors annually.

The museum also features an outdoor G-scale layout, two indoor HO scale model, and a wooden model train for children to climb on. From Thanksgiving through the New Year, local model railroad groups set up large layouts on the roundhouse floor and in select locations on the grounds of the museum. A museum store offers toys, books, DVDs, and other railroad-related items.

The museum and station were designated as a U.S. National Historic Landmark in 1961. In 2008, the museum won three awards in Nickelodeon's Parents' Picks Awards in the categories of Best Museum for Little Kids, Best Indoor Playspace for Little Kids, and Best Indoor Playspace for Big Kids. Television and film actor Michael Gross is the museum's "celebrity spokesman".

The museum definitively documented 24 Freedom Seekers that used the B&O Railroad on their journeys on the Underground Railroad – 8 of which traveled through the museum's historic site of Mount Clare. In 2021, the museum's Mount Clare Station building was designated as a National Park Service Underground Railroad Network to Freedom site.

The museum also hosts an annual Day Out with Thomas event every year, complete with the train's excursion including a non-powered Thomas the Tank Engine replica.

== History ==
The inaugural horse-drawn B&O train traveled the 13 miles (21 km) of the newly completed track from Mount Clare to Ellicott Mills (now Ellicott City, Maryland), on May 22, 1830, the first regular railroad passenger service in the U.S. The existing Mount Clare station brick structure was constructed in 1851. The adjacent roundhouse designed by Ephraim Francis Baldwin was built in 1884 to service the B&O's passenger cars.

For much of its history, the B&O had been collecting locomotives and other artifacts from its history for public relations purposes. This collection was stored in various places until the railroad decided to centralize it in a permanent home. The car shop of the Mt. Clare Shops was chosen, and the new museum opened on July 4, 1953.

The museum ended up outliving its parent B&O Railroad, and was kept intact by both the Chessie System and CSX Corporation. In 1990, CSX deeded the property and collection to the newly formed, not-for-profit museum organization governed by an independent board of directors and provided it with a $5 million endowment. In 1999, the museum became affiliated with the Smithsonian Institution.

The museum on February 17, 2003, shortly after its blizzard-caused roof collapse

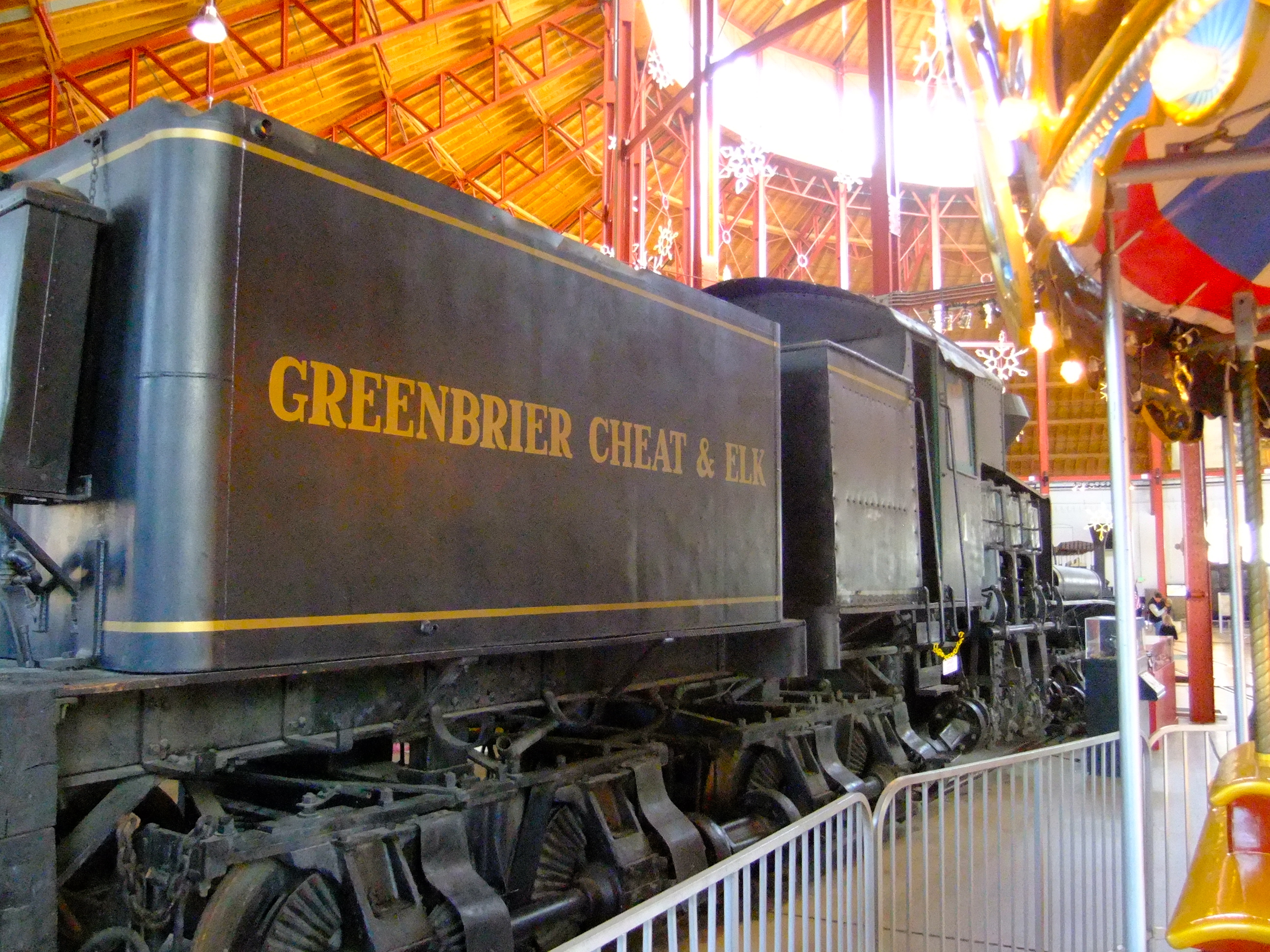
Greenbrier Cheat & Elk Railroad, 2011 photo

In the early morning of February 17, 2003, heavy snow from the Presidents' Day Storm collapsed half of the roof of the museum's roundhouse. Although the structure's central support columns remained standing, the supporting iron struts and ties of the destroyed roofing sections failed under the snow load. The museum suffered heavy damage not only to the roundhouse itself but also to the collection within the roundhouse. Some of the items were damaged beyond repair. Reporting on the devastation the following day, The Baltimore Sun said, "...hours after the collapse, columns of mangled steel stuck out from the roundhouse ... Locomotives and passenger cars in the museum's collection, some dating from the 1830s, could be seen covered with snow and debris." The roundhouse, with a newly repaired roof, reopened to the public on November 13, 2004, and the damaged locomotives and cars were surrounded by a plexiglass barrier. As of September 2015, all damaged exhibits have been restored to their original appearance.

After the roof collapse, subsequent fundraising and restoration allowed the museum to upgrade many of its facilities. In 2005 the museum opened a new service facility west of the roundhouse for restoration of historical equipment and maintenance of active equipment.

In 2026, the museum renamed itself as the National Museum of Railroad History & Innovation. The new name was intended to raise awareness of the role of railroading and as a start to major exhibit upgrades leading up to the 2027 bicentennial of American railroading. The renaming took place in conjunction with an ongoing $38 million renovation that was planned to be completed in late 2026.

== Collection ==
The National Museum of Railroad History & Innovation possesses the oldest and most comprehensive American railroad collection in the world. Dating from the beginning of American railroading, the collection contains locomotives and rolling stock, historic buildings, railroading artifacts, and an extensive archives and research library that documents the impact of American railroading and the Baltimore & Ohio Railroad on American economics, culture, and history.

The collection is being made available through an online searchable database.

== Notable rolling stock ==
External videos
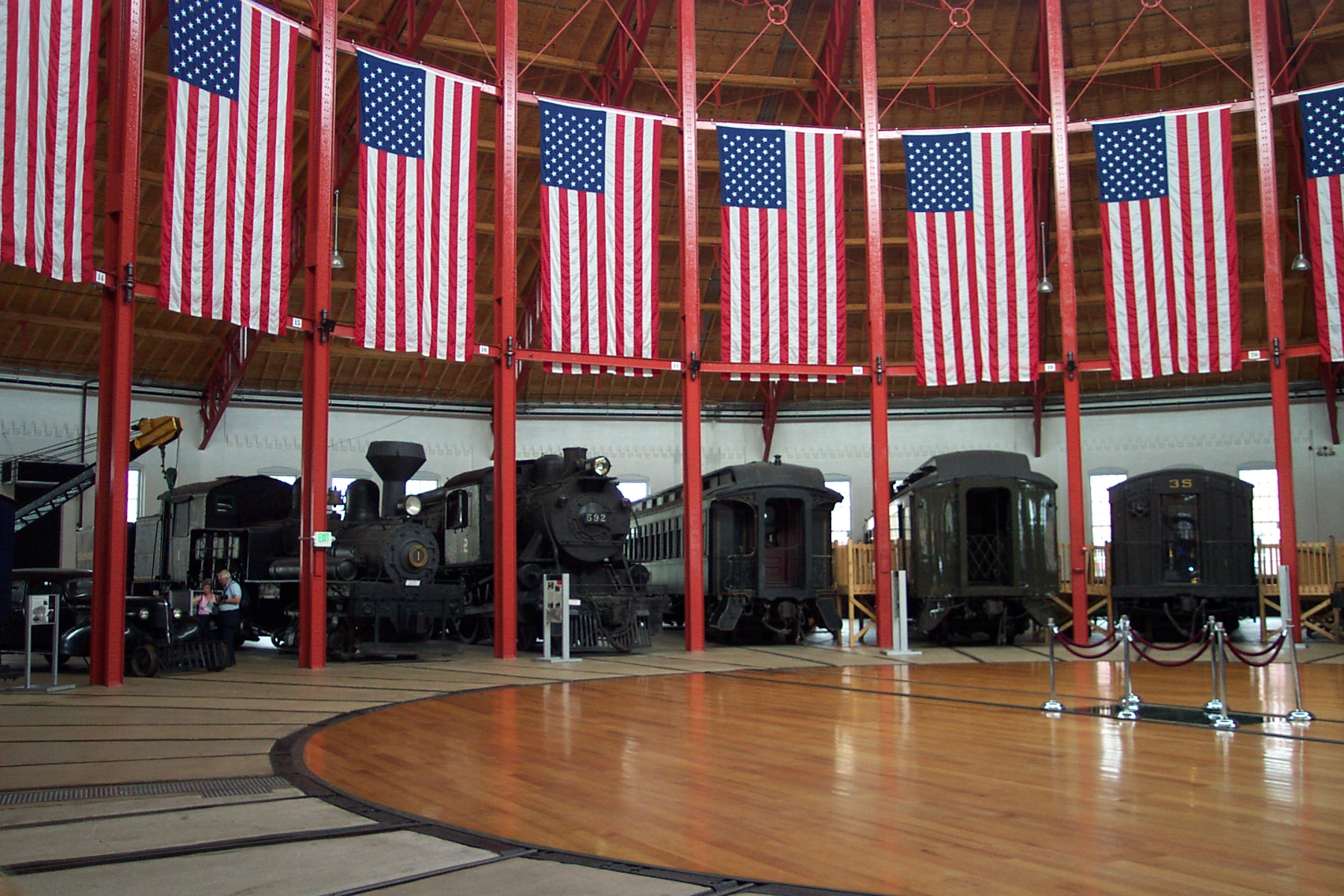
- American Artifacts: History of the B&O Railroad 30 minutes in the B&O Railroad Museum, C-SPAN
- B&O Railroad Museum Television Network – Jan 2012, Museum locomotives in Hollywood films

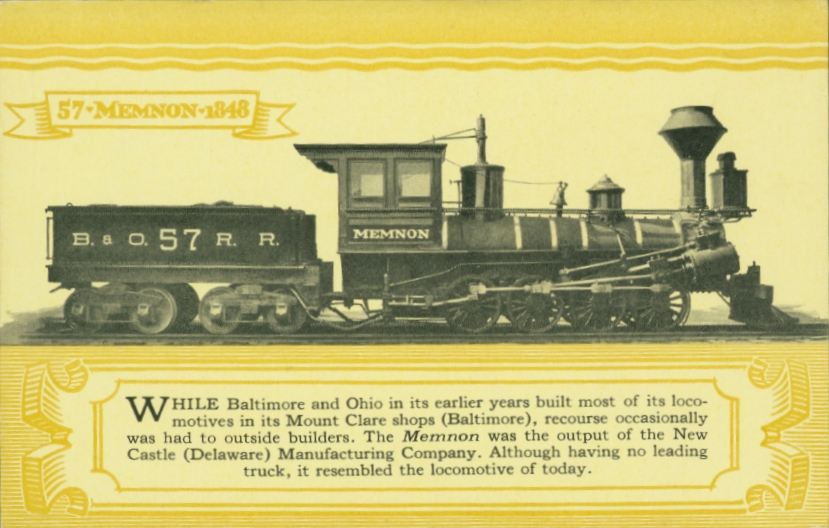
B&O Railroad Centenary Postcard: 1827–1927. Memnon locomotive ~1848

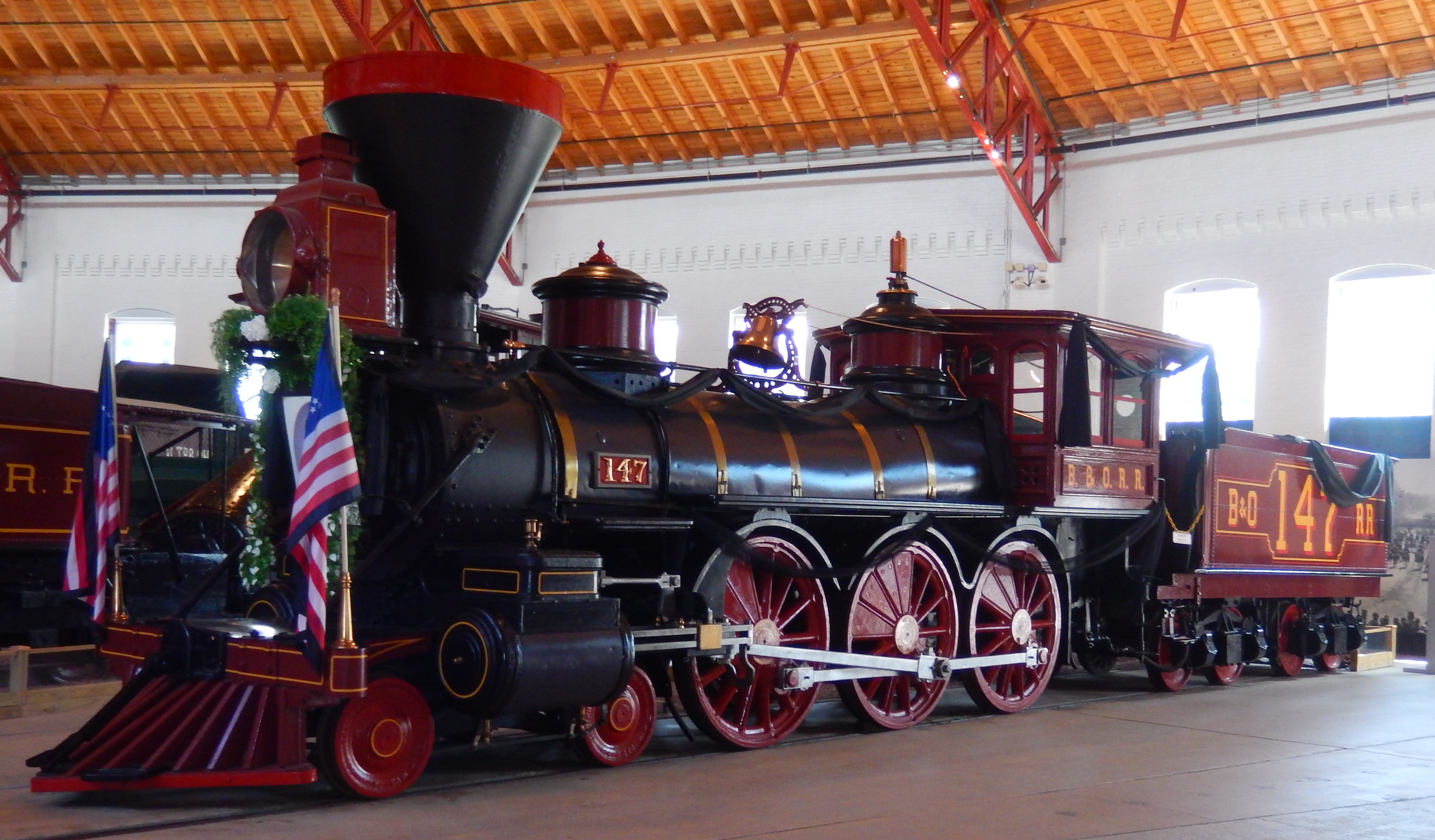
B&O Lincoln Funeral 150th Anniversary Locomotive "Thatcher Perkins" #147

The museum's rolling stock collection include both originals and replicas, some of which were built by the B&O for its centennial "Fair of the Iron Horse" in 1927. Collection highlights include:

- Baltimore and Ohio 4-4-0 #25 William Mason built in 1856, used in The Great Locomotive Chase, and later in Wild Wild West. Operated until October 2014, retired from service due to thin crown sheet.
- Baltimore & Ohio 0-4-0 "Tom Thumb" 1927 replica. Had been refurbished by the Strasburg Rail Road and restored to operating condition for 2004 "Fair of the Iron Horse." Only operated a handful of times, at most, after refurbishment. On display in the roundhouse, in non-operational condition. In need of Federally mandated boiler inspection to operate again. Last operated circa Christmas 2013.
- Baltimore & Ohio 0-4-0 #8 "John Hancock" built in 1836.
- Baltimore & Ohio 4-2-0 #13 "Lafayette" 1927 replica. In the past, it was occasionally fired up and operated by the museum for demonstration purposes, currently on display in the roundhouse, in non-operational condition. In need of federally mandated boiler inspection to operate again. Last operated circa October 2015
- Cumberland Valley 2-2-2T #13 "Pioneer" built in 1851. On loan.
- Baltimore & Ohio 4-6-0 #305: (Built in 1869 at Mt. Clare, Mother Hubbard design based on Ross Winans' design. Previously #217.)
- Baltimore & Ohio 4-6-0 #147 "Thatcher Perkins" built in 1863.
- Baltimore & Ohio 0-8-0 #57 "Memnon" built in 1848.
- Baltimore and Ohio 2-8-0 #545 A.J. Cromwell built in 1888.
- Baltimore and Ohio 2-6-0 #600 "J. C. Davis" built at Mt. Clare in 1875, which won first prize at the 1876 Centennial Exposition.
- St. Elizabeth's Hospital 0-4-0T #4: one of the last Porter steam locomotives built, built in 1950 for use at St. Elizabeth's Hospital in Washington DC. Later ran at Ft. Eustis then in storage at Cass Scenic Railroad. Arrived at B&O Museum in 1980s. Restored to operating condition in 2002 and re-restored in 2005 after suffering damage in a roof collapse. Out of Service for a 1,472-day inspection, last operated circa Fall 2015. Coal burner.
- Clinchfield Railroad 4-6-0 #1 built in 1882. The engine was used for excursions from 1968 until 1979 + 1980 Clean ups.

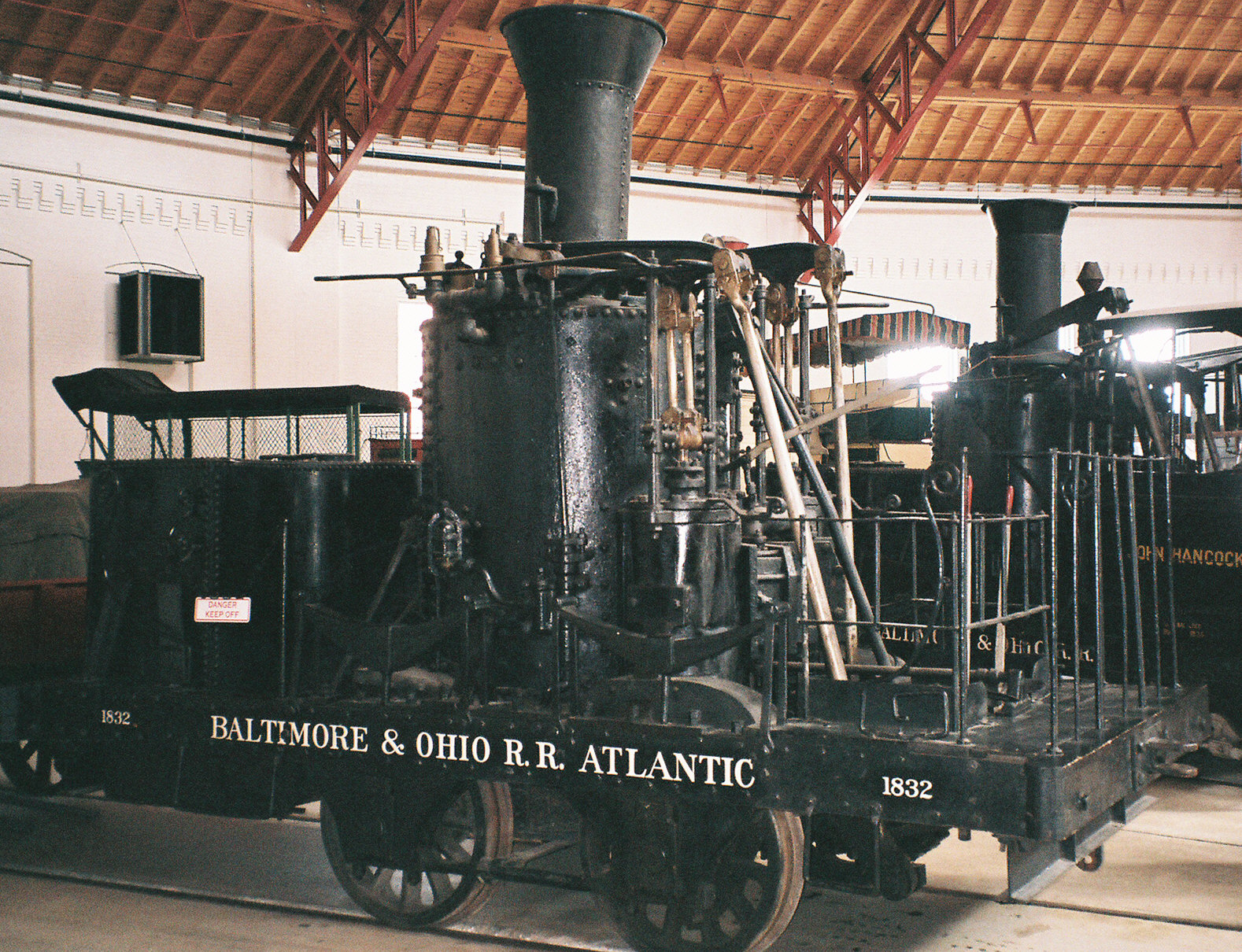
B&O 0-4-0 "Grasshopper" (1832)

- Baltimore and Ohio 0-4-0 "Grasshopper", built in 1832 by Phineas Davis and Israel Gartner, one of the oldest surviving American locomotives
- Baltimore and Ohio 4-6-2 #5300 "President Washington" built in 1927.
- Baltimore and Ohio 2-8-2 #4500, USRA Light Mikado and the world's first USRA locomotive, built in 1918.
- Chesapeake and Ohio 4-6-0 #377 built in 1902.
- Chesapeake and Ohio 4-6-4 #490: The last surviving C&O "Streamlined" Hudson built in 1926 (Streamlined 1946).
- Chesapeake and Ohio 2-8-4 #2705 built in 1943.
- Chesapeake and Ohio 2-6-6-6 #1604: One of two surviving "Allegheny"-class locomotives built in 1941.
- American Freedom Train 4-8-4 #1 (Reading #2101) built in 1945. One of three steam engines used on American Freedom Train of 1975–1976. Used on Chessie System Steam Specials in 1977–1978.
- Greenbrier, Cheat and Elk River Shay #1 built in 1905.
- Central Railroad of New Jersey 4-4-2 #592 built in 1901, one of five surviving Camelback type locomotives.
- Potomac Electric Company (PEPCO) Fireless 0-4-0 #43
- Pere Marquette SW1 #11 built in 1942. Operational.
- Central Railroad of New Jersey #1000: first commercially successful diesel built in 1925.
- Baltimore & Ohio EA #51: first streamlined diesel built in 1937. Recently completed cosmetic restoration.
- Baltimore & Ohio RDC #1961 built in 1956. Operational.
- Western Maryland BL2 #81 built in 1948 and Slug #138T built in 1941.
- Baltimore & Ohio GP30 #6944 built in 1962. Operational.
- Baltimore & Ohio GP40 #3684 built in 1966.
- Baltimore & Ohio GP9 #6607. built in 1956. Operational.
- Western Maryland RS3 #195 built in 1953
- Baltimore & Annapolis 70 tonner #50 built in 1950
- Baltimore & Ohio (Octoraro) S1 #3
- Canton Railroad Baldwin VO-1000 #32 built in 1944
- Baltimore & Ohio GP7 #6405 built in 1953. Operational.
- Chessie System GP38 #3802 built in 1967. Chosen by Trains Magazine as "All American Diesel". Operational.
- Baltimore & Ohio #10 (electric)
- Pennsylvania Railroad #4876: GG1 electric, not currently on display in the museum itself. This locomotive crashed into Washington D.C.'s Union Station in 1953 in the 1953 Federal Express train wreck.
- MARC EMD F7A APCU #7100: built in 1951, rebuilt in 1981. Used as a cab car and for supplying HEP.
- Maryland and Pennsylvania Railroad ("Ma & Pa") inspection car and Railway post office car
- Forty and Eights "Merci" boxcar. One of 49 French boxcars gifted to the US in 1949.
- B&O Royal Blue Line 1890s-era coach
- Chessie System GP15T 1507. Built in 1982 and was just recently acquired. To be restored to operating condition.
- Conrail SW7 8905. Built in 1950.

== See also ==
- List of heritage railroads in the United States
- List of National Historic Landmarks in Maryland
- List of railway roundhouses
- National Register of Historic Places listings in South and Southeast Baltimore
- National Park Service's Network to Freedom listing
