= Pennsylvania Railroad class P5 =

Class of American electric locomotives

PRR P5/P5a
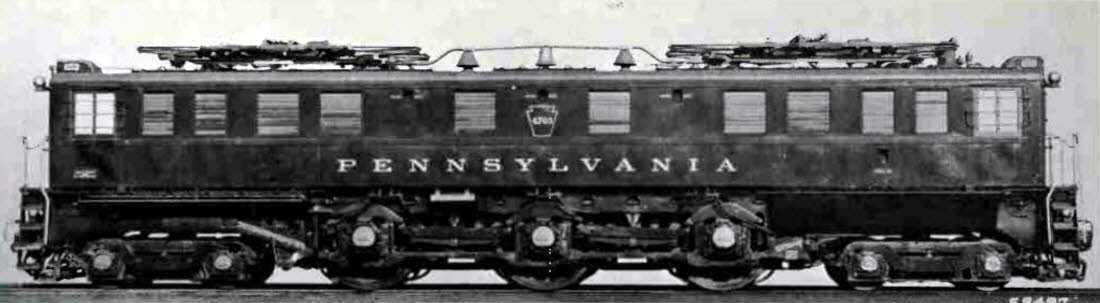
- PRR P5a #4761
Type and origin
- Power type: Electric
- Builder: PRR Altoona Works (13); Baldwin-Westinghouse (54); General Electric (25)
- Build date: 1931–1935
- Total produced: 92
Specifications
- Configuration
  - Whyte: 4-6-4OE
  - AAR: 2-C-2
  - UIC: 2′Co2′
- Gauge: 4 ft 8 1/2 in (1,435 mm) standard gauge
- Leading dia.: 36 in (914 mm)
- Driver dia.: 72 in (1,829 mm)
- Trailing dia.: 36 in (914 mm)
- Wheelbase: 49 ft 10 in (15.19 m) (total); 20 ft (6.10 m) (rigid)
- Length: 62 ft (19 m)
- Width: 10 ft 6 in (3.20 m) (P5, P5a, P5b); 10 ft 8.25 in (3.26 m) (P5a (modified))
- Height: 15 ft (4.57 m) over locked-down pantographs
- Axle load: 74,000 lb (34,000 kg; 34 t) (P5, P5a); 77,800 lb (35,300 kg; 35.3 t) (P5b); 77,000 lb (35,000 kg; 35 t) (P5a (modified))
- Adhesive weight: 220,000 lb (100,000 kg; 100 t) (P5, P5a); 444,700 lb (201,700 kg; 201.7 t) (P5b, all wheels driven); 229,000 lb (104,000 kg; 104 t) (P5a (modified))
- Loco weight: 392,000 lb (178,000 kg; 178 t) (P5, P5a); 444,700 lb (201,700 kg; 201.7 t) (P5b); 394,000 lb (179,000 kg; 179 t) (P5a (modified))
- Electric system/s: 11 kV AC @ 25 Hz Catenary
- Current pickup: Pantograph
- Traction motors: 6× 625 hp (466 kW) AC motors; plus 4× 375 hp (280 kW) motors on the trucks on P5b
- Transmission: AC current fed via transformer tap changers to paired motors geared (25:97) to quill drives on each driving axle; plus single motors geared to driving axles on end trucks on P5b (gear ratio: 17:50)
Career
- Operators: Pennsylvania Railroad
- Numbers: 4700–4791
- Preserved: 4700
- Disposition: One P5 prototype preserved; rest scrapped.

The Pennsylvania Railroad's class P5 (and subclasses P5a, P5a Modified, P5b) comprised 92 mixed-traffic electric locomotives constructed 1931–1935 by the PRR, Westinghouse and General Electric. Although the original intention was that they work mainly passenger trains, the success of the GG1 as passenger locomotives pushed the P5 class into freight service. A single survivor, prototype locomotive #4700, is at the National Museum of Transportation in St Louis, Missouri.

Table of P5 locomotive production
Year	Builder	Bodystyle	Road numbers	Notes
1931	Altoona	Boxcab	7898-7899	Class P5, Renumbered 4700 & 4791 respectively in 1933
1932	Westinghouse	Boxcab	4701–4732	4702 rebuilt to P5b in 1937
1932	General Electric	Boxcab	4755–4774	4770 rebuilt as Modified in 1945
1933	Westinghouse	Boxcab	4733-4742	
1934	Altoona	Modified	4780	
1935	Westinghouse	Modified	4743–4754	
1935	General Electric	Modified	4775-4779	
1935	Altoona	Modified	4781-4790	

== P5 prototypes ==
Two prototype locomotives were outshopped from the PRR's Altoona Works in 1931. They essentially took the PRR's 2-B-2 O1 design and lengthened it by adding another pair of driving wheels. While the O1 was an "electric Atlantic" equivalent to the E6s steam locomotive, the P5 was an "electric Pacific" designed to match or better the performance of the PRR's ubiquitous K4s Pacifics. The center driver was blind. Roller bearings were equipped on all axles.

These prototypes had electrical equipment from both Westinghouse and General Electric; the design was by both companies and the PRR's electrical department, and the equipment from each manufacturer was identical.

== P5a production locomotives ==
Orders were placed for 90 production locomotives classified P5a due to minor changes from the prototypes (notably, larger traction motor blowers). Production was split between General Electric and Westinghouse; the GE examples were assembled at GE's Erie, Pennsylvania facility, still a locomotive assembly plant today, while final assembly for the Westinghouse order was subcontracted to the Baldwin Locomotive Works.

== P5a (modified) steeplecabs ==
A fatal grade crossing accident in 1934 on the New York Division confirmed traincrews' concerns about safety when the crew were killed after colliding with a truck loaded with apples. A redesign was undertaken, giving the locomotives a central cab, raised higher, with narrower-topped, streamlined "noses" to the locomotive to enable the crew to see forward. Internal components had to be rearranged to make space for the new outline. The space inside was crammed and made maintenance challenging, resulting in them first to be scrapped, ahead of the boxcabs. The final 28 locomotives were built to this design, which was not given a separate class designation since it was mechanically and electrically identical; they were called class P5a (modified), P5am, and colloquially Modifieds.

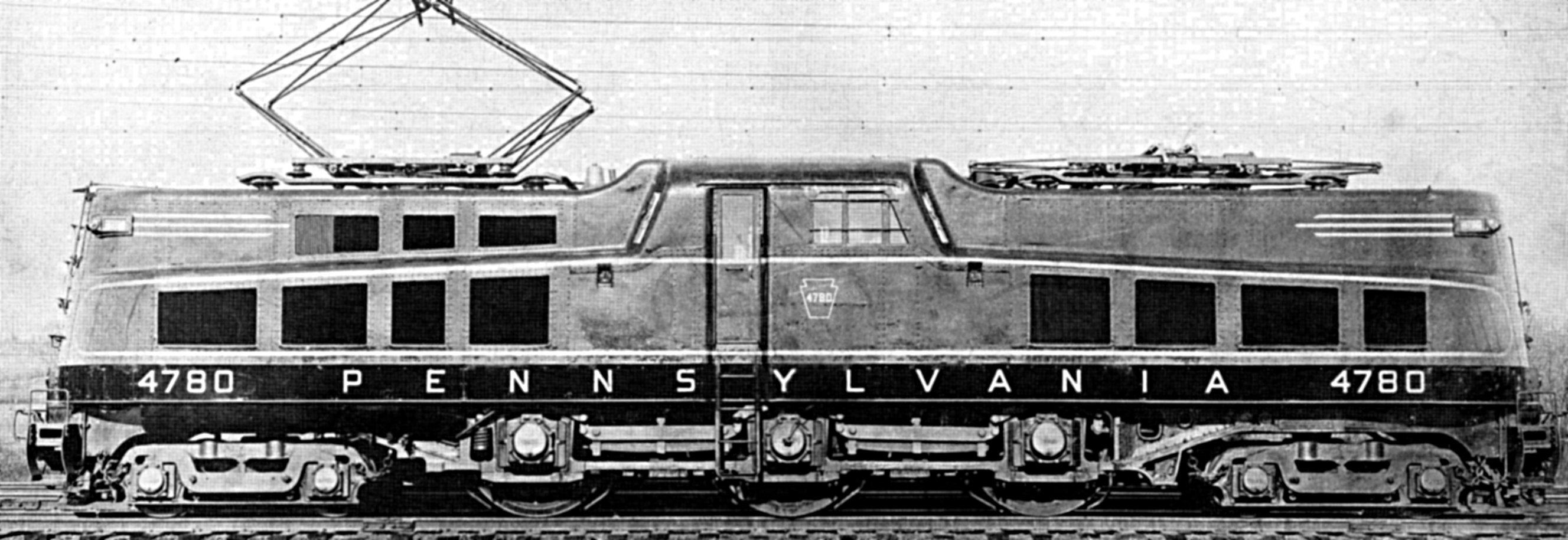
P5a (modified) #4780

Documentation published in 2010 disproved the decades long belief that the modified P5's new shell design came first and was then applied to the GG1, R1, and eventually the DD2. Instead, it was revealed that the GG1 project, under the direction of industrial designer Donald R. Dohner, was the first to receive the center cab design, and that soon afterward it was applied to the R1 and P5.

The Modified units (along with the R1 and prototype GG1) were built with riveted carbodies. However, unit #4770, rebuilt from a boxcab to a Modified appearance in January 1945 after being wrecked in February 1944, differed from previous Modifieds in having an all-welded carbody, the type of construction famously utilized in the production run of the GG1.

== P5b experiment ==
In October 1937, P5a #4702 was rebuilt with motors in its trucks to become the only locomotive in subclass P5b, in an effort to make a more competent freight electric locomotive. Each truck axle was given a 375-horsepower (280 kW) motor, adding 1,500 hp (1,100 kW) to give a total power output of 5,250 hp (3,910 kW) and a wheel arrangement of B-C-B or Bo′CoBo′. This modification meant that locomotive's entire weight was carried on driven wheels. Despite these advantages, the experiment clearly was not deemed successful enough, as these modifications were not repeated, however #4702 continued in its modified form.

Visually, the class P5b could be distinguished from a boxcab P5a by having a lower row of ventilation grilles on the sides of the superstructure, and by having outside brake cylinders on the trucks.

== Service ==
Although the P5 and subclass locomotives were originally designed for passenger service, they quickly proved insufficient, and left much to be desired. The engines performed poorly at high speeds, the stress placed on the rigid frame would result in cracking. Despite adding an extra driver and motor to the O1 design, the P5a still was deemed not powerful enough. Problems with weight distribution and suspension caused side sway (nosing) during operation at higher speeds, and over time the stress would cause cracks in the driving axles. Uneven distribution of power further contributed to axle cracking problems. Retrofitting P5s with heavier axles and suspension components did not fix the issues well enough, and the P5s eventually had their top speed restricted. The PRR continued to look for a new electric passenger locomotive, eventually resulting in the wildly successful GG1 electric.

With more and more GG1s entering service, the P5as were relived from passenger service, being regeared from 90MPH, to 70MPH for freight service. Along with their transition, steam generators were removed, as were the class lights, steam, and signal lines. Steam whistles were also replaced with air horns. While in freight service, it was common to see 2 to 3 P5s consisted together. P5a Modifieds tended to be dispatched in the front of a consist for crew protection, but this was not always followed.

Cracking frames and failing equalizers still plagued the P5s despite lowering their top speeds. Cracks allegedly did not affect operation, and welding a casted frame proved too challenging. Crews would paint the frames black once a month to hide cracking to avoid failing inspection, resulting in many grimy P5s with shiny black frames.

Crews generally preferred the GG1s over the P5a Boxcabs, which were deemed very drafty, with poor insulation in the windows, and the ride quality was not as smooth as the GG1s.

== Fate ==
The new freight electrics entering service, and the general decline of passenger service resulting in excess GG1s, spelt doom for the P5 electrics. Of interest, the Modifieds were retired prior to the Boxcabs, owing to the fact maintenance proved to be more challenging due to the shrouding and different component placement. All Modifieds were scrapped by 1962, the P5b in 1961, and the last P5a by 1965. None made it to the Penn Central era in 1968. Original P5 #4700 survives.

== See also ==
- PRR locomotive classification
