= Pennsylvania Railroad class GG1 =

Class of American electric locomotives

PRR Class GG1
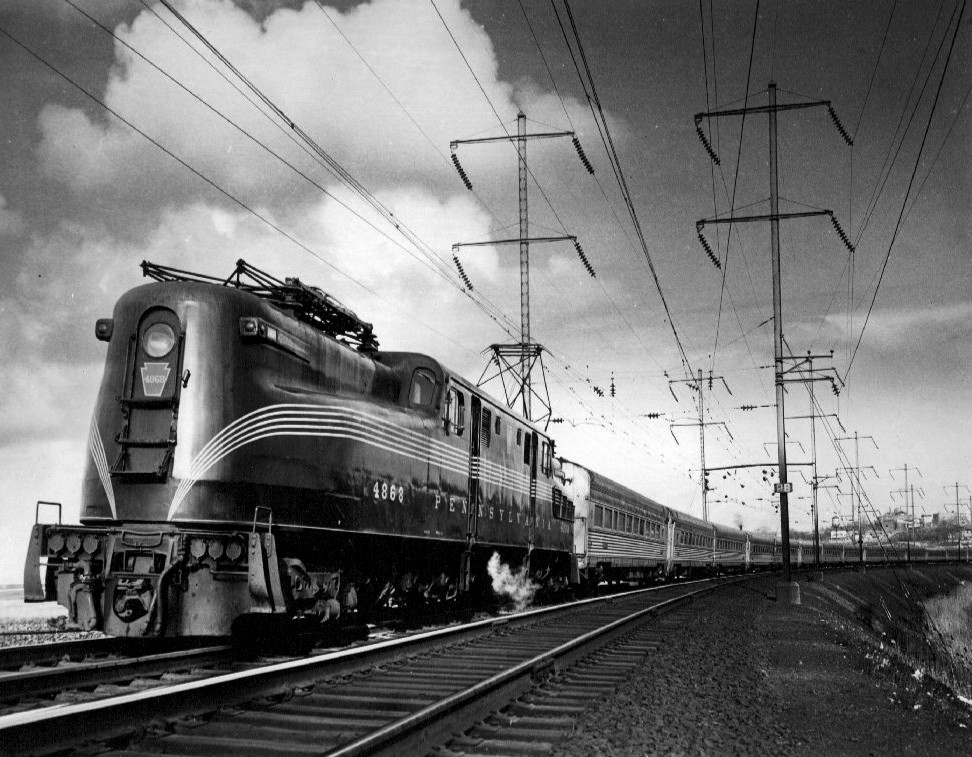
- 4868 hauling The Congressional
Type and origin
- Power type: Electric
- Designer: General Electric, Donald Dohner & Raymond Loewy
- Builder: General Electric (15); Altoona Works (124)
- Build date: 1934 – 1943
- Total produced: 139
Specifications
- Configuration
  - Whyte: 4-6-0+0-6-4OE
  - AAR: 2-C+C-2
  - UIC: (2′Co)(Co2′)
- Gauge: 4 ft 8 1/2 in (1,435 mm)
- Leading dia.: 36 in (914 mm)
- Driver dia.: 57 in (1,448 mm)
- Wheelbase: Rigid: 13 ft 8 in (4.17 m); Overall: 69 ft 0 in (21.03 m)
- Length: 79 ft 6 in (24.23 m) over coupler pulling faces
- Width: 10 ft 4 in (3.15 m)
- Height: 15 ft 0 in (4.57 m) over locked-down pantographs
- Adhesive weight: 303,000 lb (137,000 kilograms)
- Loco weight: 475,000 lb (215,000 kilograms)
- Fuel capacity: 3,000 lb (1,360 kg) or 424 US gal (1,610 L; 353 imp gal) oil, for train heating
- Water cap.: 23,000 lb (10,400 kg) or 2,760 US gal (10,450 L; 2,300 imp gal) for train heating
- Electric system/s: Overhead line, 11‍–‍13.5 kV 25 Hz AC
- Current pickup: Dual pantographs
- Traction motors: 12 × GEA-627-A1 385 hp (287 kW)
- Transmission: Alternating current fed via a 22 position transformer tap changer to paired traction motors geared to a Quill drive
- Train heating: One oil-fired 4,500 lb/hr steam generator
Performance figures
- Maximum speed: Passenger: 100 mph (160 km/h); Freight: 90 mph (145 km/h)
- Power output: Continuous: 4,620 hp (3,450 kW); Short duration: 8,500 hp (6,300 kW) @ 65 mph (105 km/h)
- Tractive effort: 65,500 lbf (291 kN)
Career
- Operators: Pennsylvania Railroad; Penn Central; Conrail; Amtrak; New Jersey Transit
- Locale: Northeast Corridor
- First run: January 28, 1935
- Last run: October 29, 1983
- Disposition: Sixteen preserved, remainder scrapped (one formerly in preservation)

The Pennsylvania Railroad Class GG1 is a class of streamlined electric locomotives built for the Pennsylvania Railroad (PRR), in the northeastern United States. The class was known for its striking art deco shell, its ability to pull trains at up to 100 mph, and its long operating career of almost 50 years.

Between 1934 and 1943, General Electric and the PRR's Altoona Works built 139 GG1s. The GG1 entered service with the PRR in 1935 and later ran on successor railroads Penn Central, Conrail, and Amtrak. The last GG1 was retired by New Jersey Transit in 1983.

Most have been scrapped, but sixteen are preserved in museums.

== Technical information ==
=== Body and mechanical ===
The GG1 was 79 feet 6 inches (24.23 m) long and weighed 475,000 pounds (215,000 kg). The frame of the locomotive was in two halves joined with a ball joint, allowing the locomotive to negotiate sharper curves. The body rested on the frame and was clad in welded steel plates. The control cabs were near the center of the locomotive on each side of the main oil-cooled transformer and oil-fired train-heating boiler. This arrangement, first used on the PRR's Modified P5 class, provided for greater crew safety in a collision and provided for bi-directional operation of the locomotive. Using Whyte notation for steam locomotives, each frame is a 4-6-0 locomotive, which in the Pennsylvania Railroad classification system is a "G". The GG1 has two such frames back to back, 4-6-0+0-6-4. The related AAR wheel arrangement classification is 2-C+C-2. This means one frame mounted upon a set of two axles unpowered (the "2") and three axles powered (the "C") hinged with the ball and socket to another frame of the same design (the +). The unpowered "2" axles are at either end of the locomotive. The GG1 was equipped with a Leslie A200 horn.

=== Electrical and propulsion ===
A pantograph on each end of the locomotive body was used to collect the 11,000 V, 25 Hz alternating current (AC) from the overhead catenary wires. In operation, the leading pantograph was usually kept lowered and the trailing one raised to collect current, since if the rear pantograph failed it would not strike the forward pantograph. A transformer between the two cabs stepped-down the 11,000 V to the voltages needed for the traction motors and other equipment. Twelve 385-horsepower (287 kW) GEA-627-A1 traction motors (AC commutator motors, not AC induction motors) drove the GG1's 57-inch (1,448 mm) diameter driving wheels on six axles using a quill drive. The power required was such that double traction motors were used, with two motors driving each axle.

The traction motors were six-pole field, 400 volts, 25 Hz rated each at 385 hp (287 kW). The motors were frame-mounted using quill drives to the sprung driving wheels, providing a flexible suspension system across a relatively long locomotive frame, which allowed full wheel weight to rest on the rail for good traction regardless of track condition. A series-wound commutator motor's speed is increased by increasing the applied voltage to the motor, thus increasing the current through the motor's armature, which is necessary for increasing its torque and thus increasing motor speed. The engineer's cab had a 21-position controller for applying voltage to the motors. Four unpowered leading/trailing wheels were mounted on each end of the locomotive.

=== Steam generation for heating ===
In the 1930s, railroad passenger cars were heated with steam from the locomotive. The GG1 had an oil-fired steam generator to feed its train's "steam line."

== History ==
Beginning in the late 1910s, the PRR received the FF1, but decided that it was too slow for passenger trains; it was relegated to heavy freight service. In the mid-1920s, it received the L5 electric, which had a third-rail power supply at the time. When the Pennsylvania built the O1 and the P5, it chose the P5 over the O1 for its ability and power on the rails. After a grade-crossing accident with the P5a, the cab was moved to the center and was designated P5a (Modified). The P5a’s rigid frame did not track well at high speeds and began developing cracks, leading the PRR to seek an improved design. They found two contacts as early as 1932. The mechanical design of the GG1 was based largely on the EP3, which the PRR had borrowed from the New York, New Haven & Hartford Railroad to compare it to the P5a. In 1933, the PRR decided to replace its P5a locomotives; it asked General Electric and Westinghouse to design prototype locomotives with a lighter axle load and more power than the P5a, a top speed of at least 100 miles per hour (160 km/h), a streamlined body design, and a single (central) control cab.

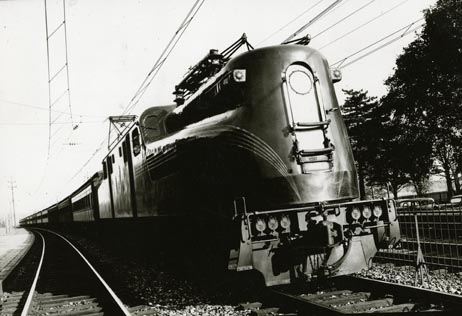
GG1 locomotive c. 1940

Both companies delivered their prototypes to PRR in August 1934. Westinghouse's R1 was essentially "little more than an elongated and more powerful version of the P5a" with an AAR wheel arrangement of 2-D-2. General Electric delivered its GG1. Both locomotives were tested for ten weeks in regular service between New York and Philadelphia and on a test track in Claymont, Delaware. PRR chose the GG1 because the R1's rigid wheelbase prevented it from negotiating sharp curves and some railroad switches. On November 10, 1934, the railroad ordered 57 locomotives: 14 assembled by General Electric in Erie, 18 by the PRR's own Altoona Works, and 20 more in Altoona with electrical components from Westinghouse in East Pittsburgh and chassis from the Baldwin Locomotive Works in Eddystone. An additional 81 locomotives were built at Altoona between 1937 and 1943.The primary spotting difference between the initial run of 57 locomotives and the second run of 81 locomotives is the latter having drop coupler pilots on each end.

On January 28 1935, to mark the completion of electrification of the line from Washington, D.C., to New York City, PRR ran a special train hauled by Pennsylvania Railroad 4800 before it opened the line for revenue service on February 10. It made a round-trip from D.C. to Philadelphia; it completed the return leg in a record 1 hour and 50 minutes.

In 1945, a Pennsylvania GG1 hauled the funeral train of President Franklin D. Roosevelt from Washington Union Station to New York Pennsylvania Station.

In the mid-1950s, with declining demand for passenger train service, GG1s 4801–4857 were re-geared for a maximum speed of 90 miles per hour (140 km/h) and placed in freight service. They initially retained their train-heating steam generator, and were recalled to passenger service for holiday-season mail trains and 'Passenger Extras' such as those run for the annual Army–Navy football game in Philadelphia.

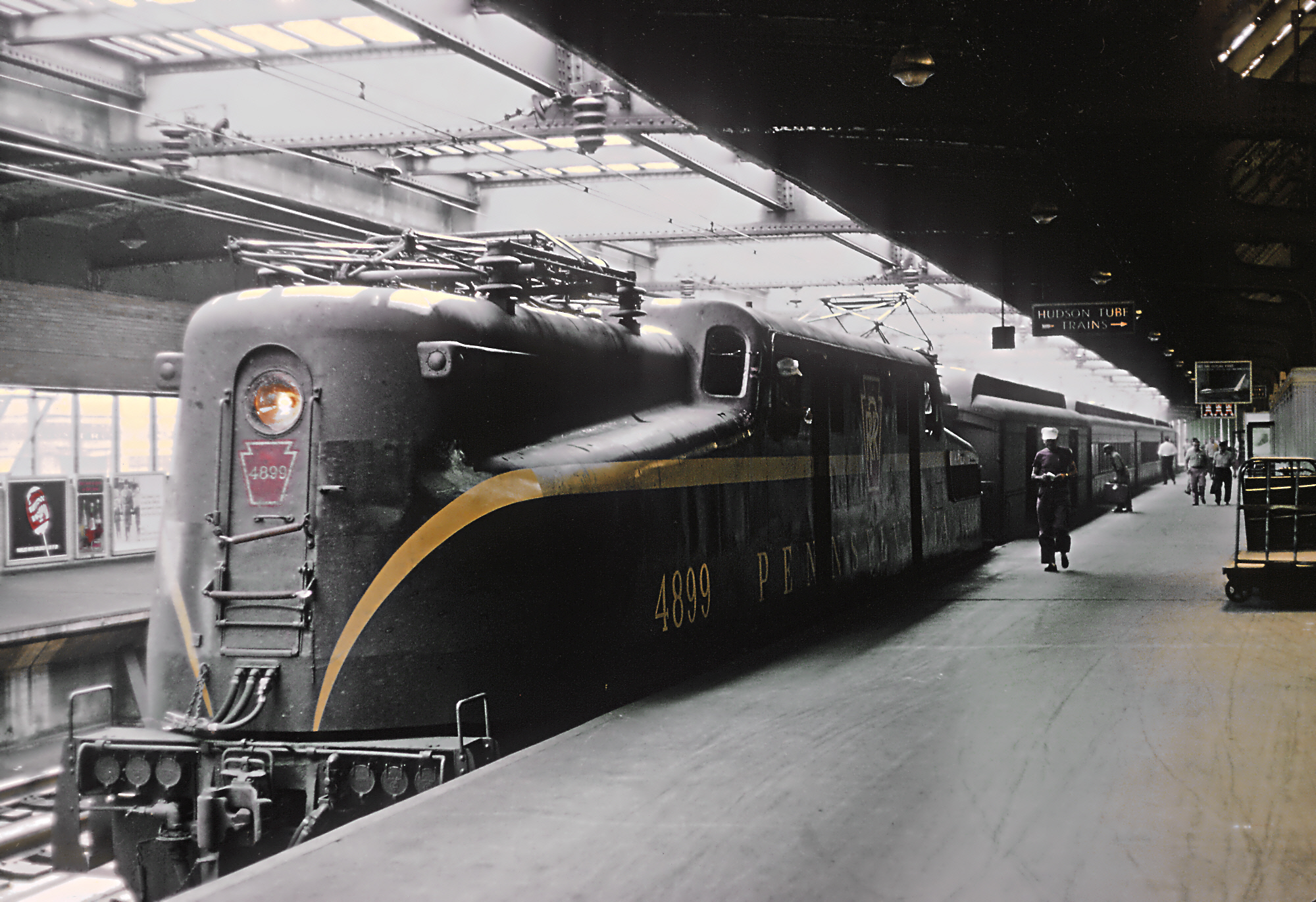
Pennsylvania Railroad GG-1 4899 at Newark, NJ in September 1964

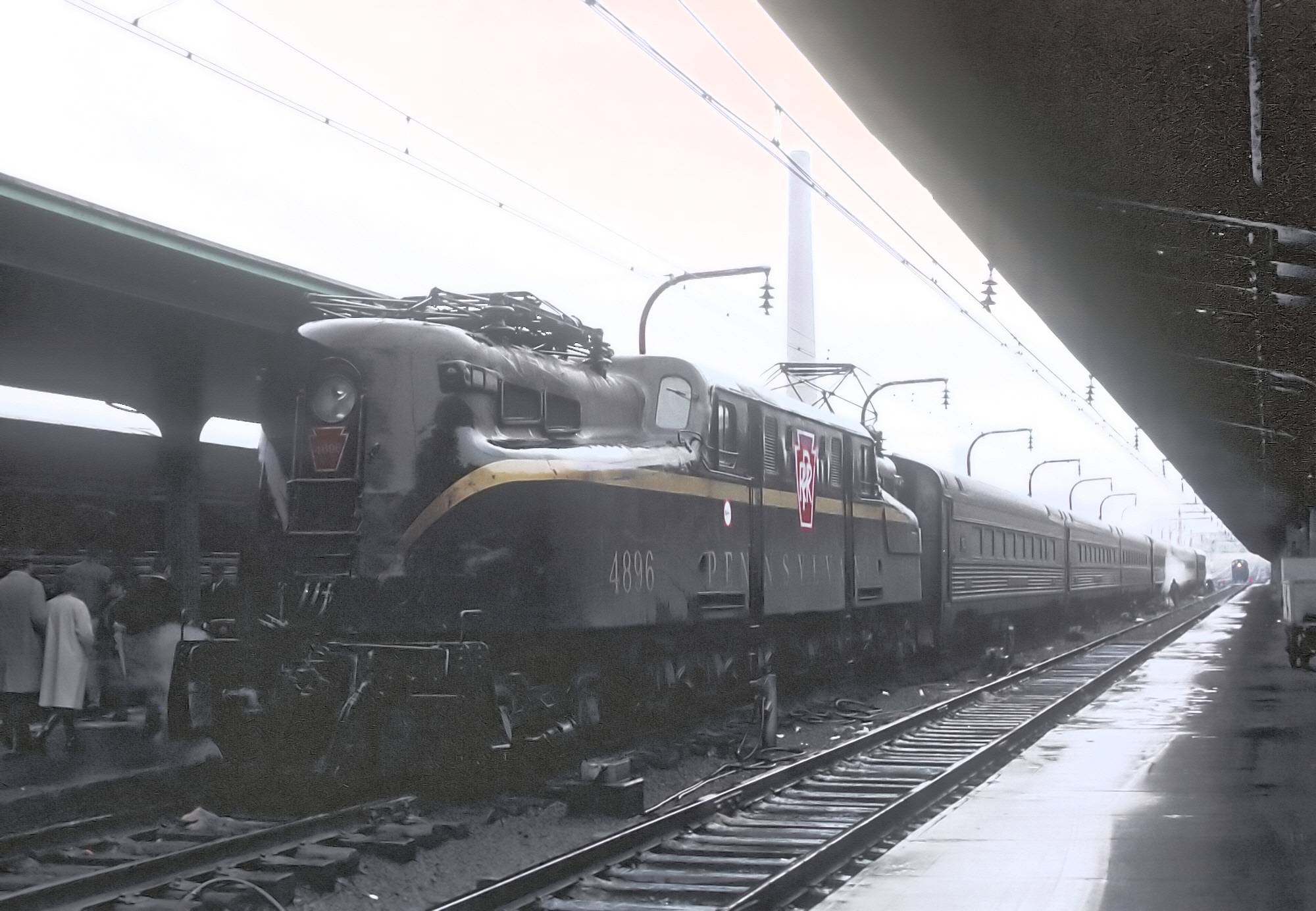
A Penn Central GG1 with The Afternoon Congressional at Washington Union Station on January 18, 1969

Timetable speed limit for the GG1 was 75–80 mph (121–129 km/h) until October 1967, when some were allowed 100 mph (160 km/h) for a couple of years. When Metroliner cars were being overhauled in the late 1970s, GG1s were again allowed 100 mph for a short time when hauling Amfleet cars on trains scheduled to run 226.6 mi (364.7 km) from New York to Washington in 3 hours and 20 to 25 minutes.

On June 8, 1968, two Penn Central GG1s hauled Robert F. Kennedy's funeral train from New York Penn Station to Washington, D.C.

=== Shell design ===
The first designer for the GG1 project was industrial designer Donald Roscoe Dohner, who produced initial scale-styling models, although the completed prototype looked somewhat different. At some point, the PRR hired famed industrial designer Raymond Loewy to "enhance the GG1's aesthetics", leading to the final 'Art Deco' design it became known for.

Although it was thought until 2009 that Loewy was solely responsible for the GG1's styling, Dohner is now understood to have contributed as well (Dohner's GG1 designs influenced the modified P5as, which debuted before the GG1 — not, as was thought, the other way around). Loewy did claim that he recommended the use of a smooth, welded body instead of the riveted one used in the prototype. Loewy also added five gold pinstripes and a DGLE (Dark Green Locomotive Enamel) paint scheme.

Following the delivery of sixty new streamlined cars from the Budd Company in 1952 for use on The Senator and Congressional service, 10 GG1s were repainted in a unique 5 stripe Tuscan red paint scheme to match. This included 6 GG1s (#4908-4913) in 1952, and 4 GG1s (#4876, #4856, #4857 and #4929) in 1953. In 1955, all were repainted into DGLE colors, with a simplified single broad stripe scheme with large red keystones., with the exception of 5 GG1s: #4907 and #4916 were painted Tuscan red with single broad stripe, and #4866, #4872 and #4880 were given a special silver scheme with red single broad stripe. All of these GG1s were eventually repainted DGLE with standard livery.

=== Incidents ===
On September 6, 1943, the Congressional Limited crashed at Frankford Junction, in the Kensington section of Philadelphia, Pennsylvania. The train was pulled by GG1 4930. The accident was caused by a journal box fire (a hot box) on the front of the seventh of the train's 16 cars. The journal box seized and an axle snapped, catching the underside of the truck and catapulting the car upwards. It struck a signal gantry, which peeled off its roof along the line of windows "like a can of sardines". Car #8 wrapped itself around the gantry upright in a figure U. The next six cars were scattered at odd angles over the tracks, and the last two cars remained undamaged. In total, 79 passengers died, all from cars #7 and #8, and 117 were injured, some seriously.

On January 15, 1953, train 173, the overnight Federal from Boston, was approaching Washington behind GG1 4876. The train passed a signal 2.1 miles (3.4 km) north of Washington Union Station between 60 and 70 miles per hour (97 and 113 km/h), and the engineer decreased the throttle and started applying the brakes. When the engineer realized that the train was not slowing down, and applying the emergency brake had no effect, he sounded the engine's horn. A signalman, hearing the horn and noting the speed of the 4876, phoned ahead to the station master's office. 4876 negotiated several switches at speeds well over the safe limits and entered the station at around 35 to 40 miles per hour (56 to 64 km/h). The train demolished the bumping post, continued through the station master's office and into the concourse, where it fell through the floor into the station's basement. Thanks to the evacuation of the concourse, no one died, either in the station or aboard the train. A temporary floor was erected over the engine, and the hole it created, for the inauguration of President Dwight D. Eisenhower. 4876 was eventually dismantled, removed from the basement and reassembled with a new frame and superstructure in Altoona. The reconstructed 4876 survives at the National Museum of Railroad History & Innovation in Baltimore.

The accident was determined to have been caused by a closed "angle cock", a valve on the front and rear of all locomotives and rail cars used in the train's airbrake system, on the rear of the third car in the train. The handle of the angle cock had been improperly placed and had contacted the bottom of the car. Once it was closed, the air brake pipe on all the cars behind the closed valve remained at full pressure, keeping the brakes released on those cars while the brakes on the locomotive and first three cars were applied in emergency.

The only major electro-mechanical breakdown of the GG1 was caused by a blizzard on February 15-16, 1958 (called The Great Blizzard of '58) that swept across the northeastern United States, and put 134 of 139 GG1s out of commission. The uniquely exceptionally fine snow observed in that blizzard passed through the air intake grills and short circuiting electrical components. This phenomenon was observed to only affect the GG1s. P5a Boxcabs were not impacted by the snow and were sent as rescue power for passenger trains. Since they lacked steam heating boilers, the Boxcabs were used in conjunction with GG1s for heating. After the storm, with the snow melted, some GG1s came back to life as others required repairs. As a result of this incident, some 40 locomotives had their air intakes relocated to a position under the pantographs, and original grills welded over.

=== Disposition ===
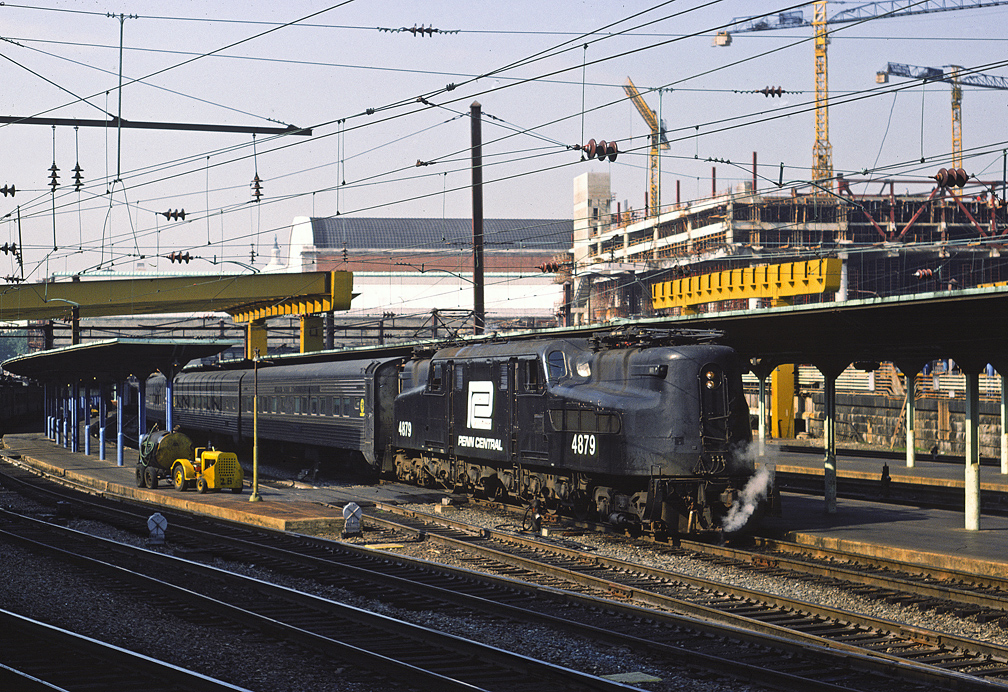
Penn Central GG1 with the Southern Crescent in 1976.

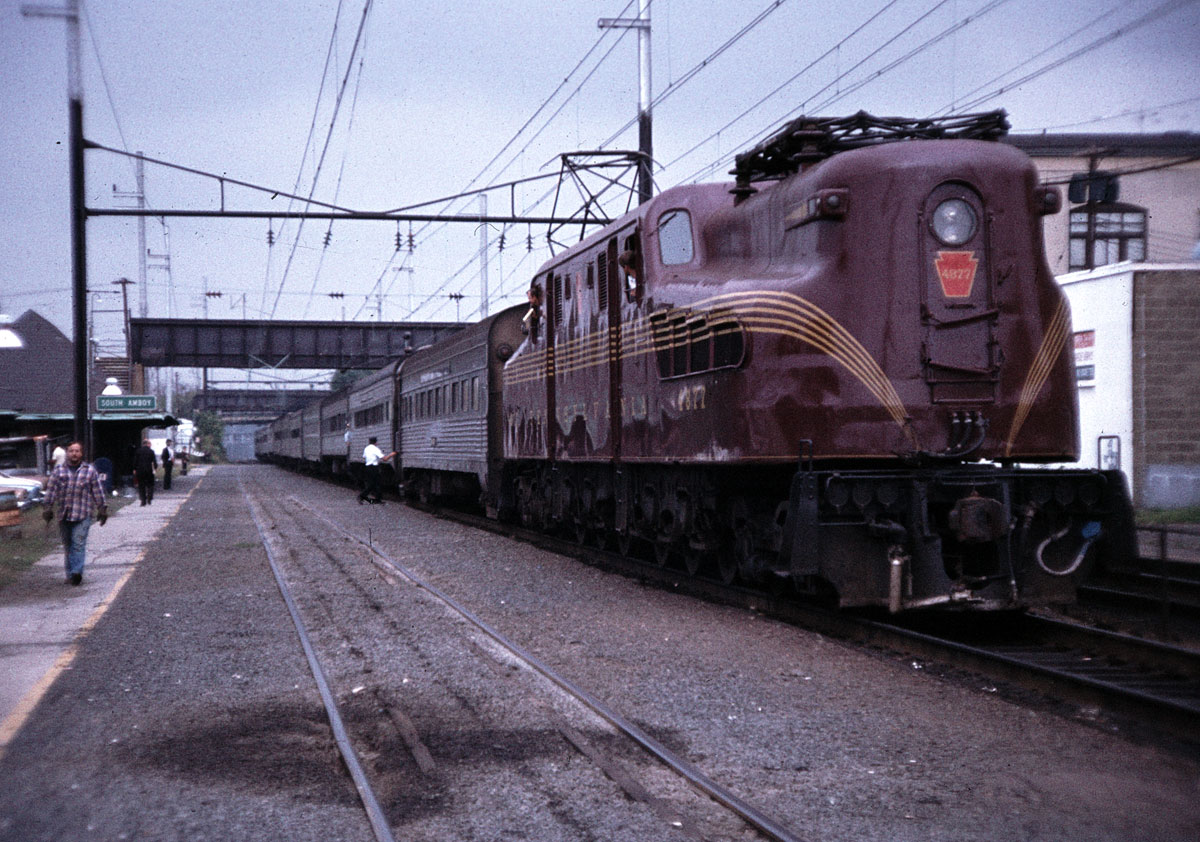
NJ Transit 4877 at South Amboy, New Jersey in 1981

In 1968, the PRR, with its 119 surviving GG1s, merged with the New York Central Railroad to form Penn Central. Penn Central went bankrupt in 1970 and its freight operations were later assumed by government-controlled Conrail, which used 68 GG1s in freight service until the end of electric freight traction in 1980.

After its creation in 1971, Amtrak purchased 30 GG1s for $50,000 each and leased another 21, of which 11 were for use on New York and Long Branch commuter trains. Amtrak initially renumbered the purchased GG1s as Nos. 900 to 929; later the railroad added a prefixed "4". This replicated some of the numbers of the leased units, which were renumbered 4930 to 4939, except 4935, which kept its old PRR/PC number.

Amtrak unsuccessfully attempted to replace the GG1s in 1975 with the General Electric E60. An E60 derailed during testing at 102-mile-per-hour (164 km/h), forcing an investigation (the E60 used the same trucks as the P30CH diesel then in service with Amtrak) that delayed acceptance. The hoped-for 120 miles per hour (193 km/h) service speed was never achieved (timetable limit was 90 mph, then 80, then 90).

A replacement was finally found after Amtrak imported and tested two lightweight European locomotives: X995, an Rc4a built by ASEA of Sweden, and X996, a derivative of the French Alsthom-MTE CC 21000. The railroad picked the ASEA design, initially nicknamed the "Swedish swifty" or the "Mighty Mouse" and later often referred to as the "Swedish Meatball". Electro-Motive Diesel, then a part of General Motors, was licensed to build a derivative called the AEM-7. As AEM-7s arrived, Amtrak finally ended GG1 service on April 26, 1980.

The last GG1s in use were some of the 13 assigned to New Jersey Transit (#4872–4884) for its North Jersey Coast Line between New York and South Amboy (the former New York and Long Branch) that ran until October 29, 1983, thus retiring the locomotive after 49 years of service.

== Preservation ==
Fifteen production locomotives and the prototype were preserved in museums. None are operational; their main transformers were removed because of the PCBs in the insulating oil.

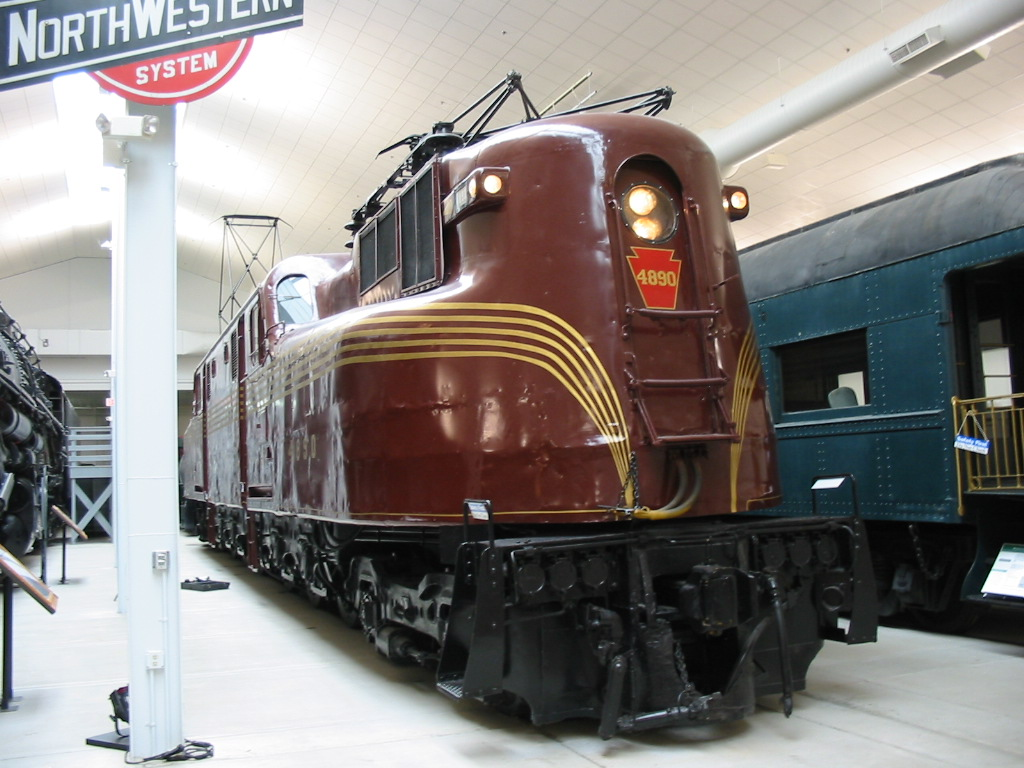
PRR 4890, on display at the National Railroad Museum in Green Bay, Wisconsin.

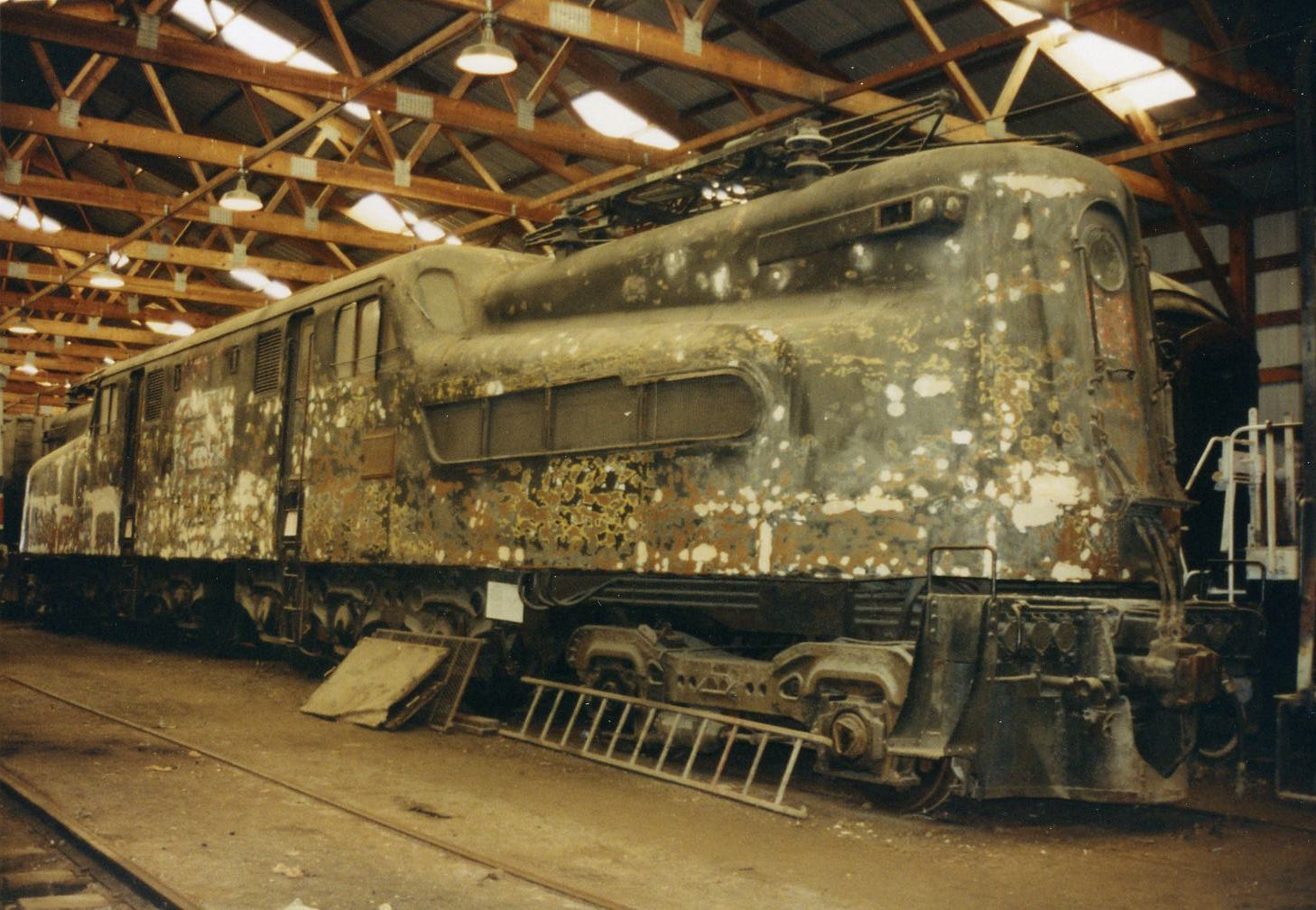
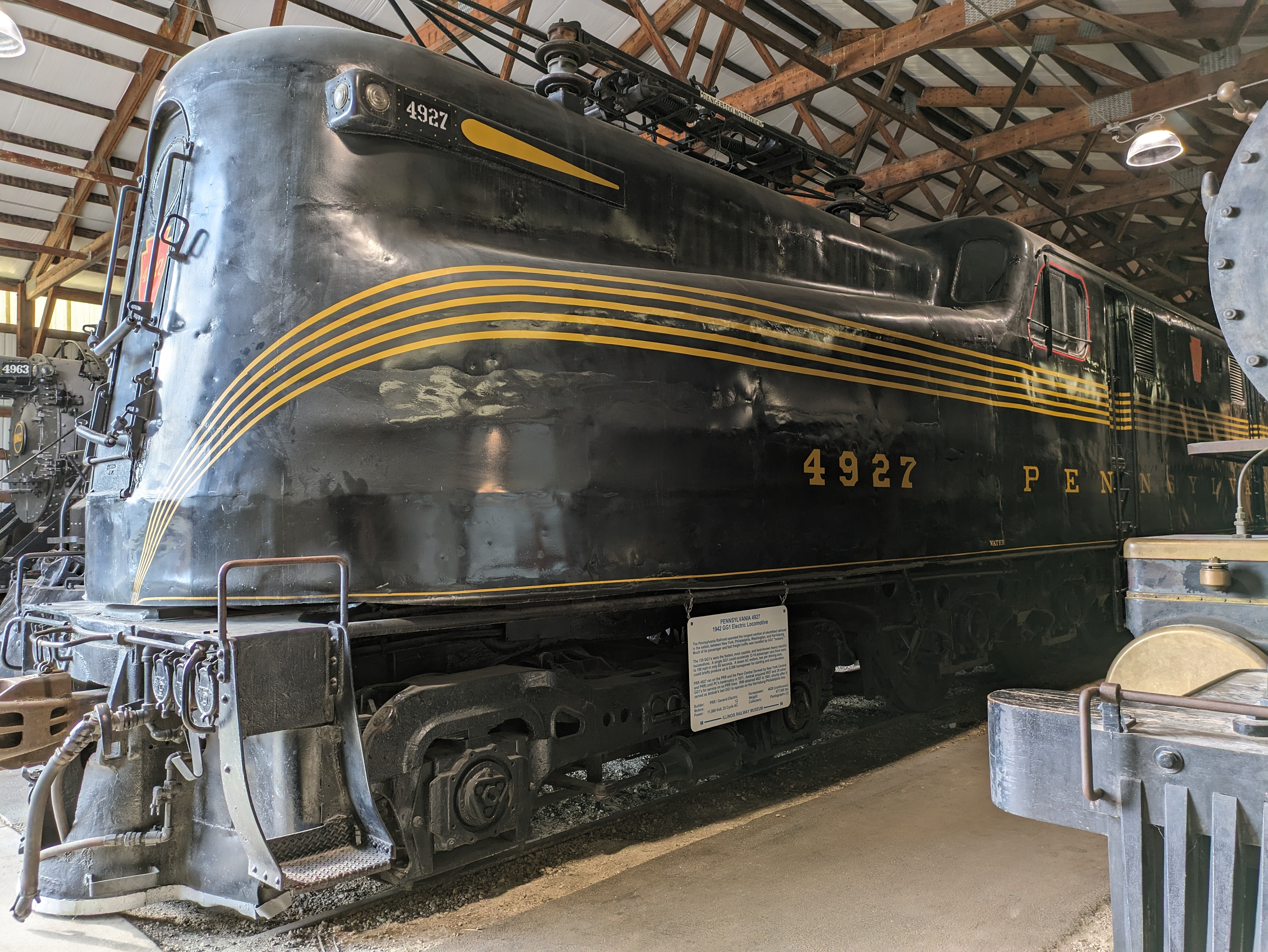
Amtrak 4939 undergoing preparation for repainting as PRR 4927 and later on display at the Illinois Railway Museum.
- PRR/PC/CR 4800 — Railroad Museum of Pennsylvania, Strasburg, Pennsylvania (nicknamed "Old Rivets" due to it being the only GG1 to have been built with a riveted body)
- PRR/PC/CR 4859 — Transportation Center, Harrisburg, Pennsylvania (designated Pennsylvania State electric locomotive in 1987)
- PRR/PC/CR/NJT 4876 — National Museum of Railroad History & Innovation, Baltimore, Maryland (reconstructed with new frame and superstructure as well as reusable components from the original 4876 following the 1953 Washington Union Station wreck)
- PRR/PC/CR/NJT 4877 — United Railroad Historical Society of New Jersey, Boonton, New Jersey (formerly nicknamed "Big Red")
- PRR/PC/CR/NJT 4879 — United Railroad Historical Society of New Jersey, Boonton, New Jersey
- PRR/PC/CR/NJT 4882 — National New York Central Railroad Museum, Elkhart, Indiana (currently painted in Penn Central colors)
- PRR/Amtrak 4890 — National Railroad Museum, Green Bay, Wisconsin
- PRR 4903/Amtrak (4)906 — Museum of the American Railroad, Frisco, Texas (hauled Robert F. Kennedy's funeral train with GG1 4901 from New York to Washington on June 8, 1968).
- PRR 4909/Amtrak 4932 — Leatherstocking Railway Museum, Cooperstown Junction, New York
- PRR 4913/Amtrak (4)913 — Railroaders Memorial Museum, Altoona, Pennsylvania
- PRR 4917/Amtrak 4934 — Leatherstocking Railway Museum, Cooperstown Junction, New York
- PRR 4918/Amtrak (4)916 — National Museum of Transportation, St Louis, Missouri
- PRR 4919/Amtrak (4)917 — Virginia Museum of Transportation, Roanoke, Virginia
- PRR 4927/Amtrak 4939 — Illinois Railway Museum, Union, Illinois
- PRR 4933/Amtrak (4)926 — Central New York Chapter of the National Railroad Historical Society, Syracuse, New York. It has been cosmetically restored and is on display at the NYS Fairgrounds Historic Train Exhibit.
- PRR 4935 / Amtrak 4935 — Railroad Museum of Pennsylvania, Strasburg, Pennsylvania (nicknamed "Blackjack" because the numerals in 4935 add up to 21, the winning number in the card game of the same name)

== In popular culture ==
During the mid-1930s, many railroads streamlined locomotives and passenger cars to convey a fashionable sense of speed. While the Union Pacific had the M-10000 and the Chicago, Burlington & Quincy Railroad the Zephyr, the PRR had the GG1. The GG1 has "shown up over the years in more advertisements and movie clips than any other locomotive." It was also featured in art calendars provided by PRR, which were used to "promote its reputation in the public eye."

PRR-painted GG1s appear in the films Broadway Limited in 1941, The Clock in 1945, Blast of Silence in 1961, the 1962 version of The Manchurian Candidate, and Avalon in 1990. Two GG1s appear in the 1973 film The Seven-Ups—a black Penn Central locomotive and a silver, red and blue Amtrak locomotive. A Penn Central GG1 also appears in another 1973 film The Last Detail. PRR GG1 4821 appears briefly in the 1952 film The Greatest Show on Earth, hauling the Ringling Bros. Barnum & Bailey Circus into Philadelphia's Greenwich Yard, as the movie's director Cecil B. DeMille narrates the scene of its arrival. Near the end of the 1951 film Bright Victory, GG1 #4849 is shown pulling into the station.

A GG1 and the Congressional were featured on a postage stamp as part of the United States Postal Service's All Aboard! 20th Century American Trains set in 1999.

The PC games Railroad Tycoon II, Railroad Tycoon 3, Train Fever, Transport Fever, Transport Fever 2 and Transport Fever 3 allow players to purchase and operate GG1 locomotive engines on their train routes. The GG1 is also available with the default Trainz Simulator Games in recent years, and is available as add-ons for Railworks, Train Simulator by Dovetail Games and Microsoft Train Simulator. A GG1 in a fictional Soviet color scheme appears as an environmental prop in the 2023 first-person-shooter Atomic Heart.

Model GG1s have been produced in G, O, S, HO, N and Z scales by Rivarossi, Bachmann, Tyco, Lionel, MTH, USA Trains, Kato, Astor, Fine Art Models, Märklin and other manufacturers.

== Sources ==
- Abendschein, Frederic H. (April 23, 1983). "Pennsylvania Railroad Electric Locomotive GG1 4800" (PDF). American Society of Mechanical Engineers. Archived from the original (PDF) on April 7, 2014.
- "All Aboard! 20th Century American Trains". United States Postal Service. 1999. Archived from the original on May 17, 2008.
- "$15,000,000 order for P.R.R. engines". The New York Times. November 11, 1934. p. N11.
- Interstate Commerce Commission (February 17, 1953). "Accident at Union Station, Washington D.C." (PDF). Interstate Commerce Commission. Archived from the original (PDF) on August 23, 2011.
- Avalon (Motion picture). TriStar Pictures. October 5, 1990.
- Ball, Don (1986). The Pennsylvania Railroad, 1940s–1950s. Chester, Vermont: Elm Tree Books. ISBN 0-393-02357-5.
- Benjamin, Philip (February 21, 1958). "Troubles abating on the Pennsylvania". The New York Times. p. 25.
- Bezilla, Michael (1980). Electric Traction on the Pennsylvania Railroad, 1895–1968. University Park: Penn State University Press. ISBN 978-0271002415. OCLC 5336721.
- Blast of Silence (Motion picture). Universal-International. April 1961.
- Bradley, Rodger (1985). Amtrak: The US National Railroad Passenger Corporation. Poole, Dorset, UK: Blandford Press. ISBN 0-7137-1718-1.
- Broadway Limited (Motion picture). Hal Roach Studios. June 13, 1941.
- Burks, Edward C (January 6, 1980). "Amtrak pressing for 'corridor' work". The New York Times. p. NJ1, NJ23.
- Burks, Edward C (December 19, 1975). "Amtrak will use new locomotives". The New York Times. p. 18.
- The Clock (Motion picture). Metro-Goldwyn-Mayer. May 25, 1945.
- Cupper, Dan (1992). Crossroads of Commerce: The Pennsylvania Railroad calendar art of Grif Teller. Richmond, Vermont: Great Eastern. ISBN 0-9625602-1-9.
- The Last Detail (Motion picture). Columbia Pictures. December 12, 1973.
- Loftus, Joseph A (January 16, 1953). "Runaway train rams station in Washington, injured 41". The New York Times. pp. 1, 16.
- The Manchurian Candidate (Motion picture). Metro-Goldwyn-Mayer. October 24, 1962.
- Middleton, William D. (2001) [1974]. When the Steam Railroads Electrified (2nd ed.). Bloomington, Indiana: Indiana University Press. ISBN 978-0-253-33979-9. OL 2510988W.
- Middleton, William D. (1961). The Interurban Era. Kalmbach Publishing, Milwaukee, WI.
- Palmateer, Jake (March 31, 2008). "Ford Museum buys local locomotive". The Daily Star.
- Schafer, Mike; Soloman, Brian (2009). Pennsylvania Railroad. Minneapolis: Voyageur Press. ISBN 978-0-7603-2930-6.
- The Seven-Ups (Motion picture). 20th Century Fox. December 14, 1973.
- Soloman, Brian (2003). Electric Locomotives. Saint Paul, MN: MBI Publishing. ISBN 0-7603-1359-8.
- Volkmer, William D. (1991). Pennsy Electric Years. Edison, New Jersey: Morning Sun Books. ISBN 1-878887-01-7.
- Wayt, Hampton C. (Summer 2009). "Donald Dohner: The man who designed 'RIVETS'". Classic Trains. 10 (2). Kalmbach: 30–35.
- Wayt, Hampton C. (Fall 2010). "Update on the GG1's genesis". Classic Trains. 11 (3). Kalmbach: 86–87.
