= Pennsylvania Railroad class DD2 =

PRR DD2
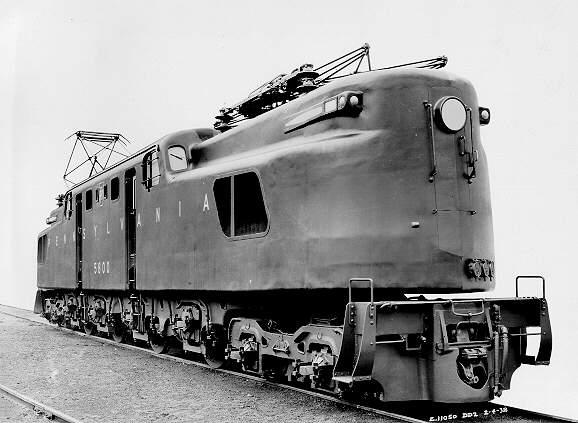
Type and origin
- Power type: Electric
- Builder: PRR Juniata Shops
- Build date: February 7, 1938
- Total produced: 1
Specifications
- Configuration
  - Whyte: 4-4-0+0-4-4OE
  - AAR: 2-B+B-2
  - UIC: (2'Bo)(Bo'2)
- Gauge: 4 ft 8 1/2 in (1,435 mm) standard gauge
- Leading dia.: 36 in (914 mm)
- Driver dia.: 62 in (1,575 mm)
- Trailing dia.: 36 in (914 mm)
- Length: 72 ft 6 1/4 in (22.10 m)
- Width: 10 ft 6 1/4 in (3.21 m)
- Height: 15 ft 0 in (4.57 m) (pantographs locked down)
- Adhesive weight: 296,000 lb (134,000 kg)
- Loco weight: 450,000 lb (200,000 kg)
- Electric system/s: 11 kV, AC 25 Hz overhead
- Current pickup(s): 2 roof-mounted pantographs (normally only one raised)
- Traction motors: 4 × 1,250 hp (930 kW) Westinghouse 428-A traction motor paired sets
- Transmission: AC current fed via transformer tap changer to motors geared to a Quill drive
Performance figures
- Maximum speed: 70 mph (110 km/h)
- Power output: 5,000 hp (3,700 kW)
- Tractive effort: 71,500 lbf (318 kN)
Career
- Operators: Pennsylvania Railroad
- Class: DD2
- Number in class: 1
- Numbers: 5800
- Locale: Wilmington, Delaware-Philadelphia, Pennsylvania, latterly Baltimore, Maryland area.
- First run: 1938
- Scrapped: September 1962
- Disposition: Scrapped

The Pennsylvania Railroad's class DD2 was a single prototype electric locomotive never placed into series production. It was intended as an improved and simplified GG1 for use on the planned, but never built, extension of the PRR's electrification west of Harrisburg, Pennsylvania. The one locomotive produced was numbered #5800 and used in regular Baltimore tunnel helper service until it was scrapped in September 1962.

== Design, construction and testing ==
On May 21, 1937, a meeting was held in Philadelphia to outline the design of a new electric freight locomotive. The meeting was attended by the PRR and Baldwin, as well as electrical suppliers General Electric and Westinghouse, and the transportation engineering firm Gibbs & Hill, who were consultants on the proposal to extend electrification to Pittsburgh. The locomotive being designed was what became the DD2.

== Technical details ==
Although the design specified either passenger gearing or freight gearing, the prototype was only ever used with freight gearing. Its wheel arrangement was 4-4-0+0-4-4 in the Whyte notation, or 2-B+B-2 in the AAR's system.

It had two frames, hinged together in the middle, with the driving wheels and motors mounted directly to each frame, two pairs per side. A swinging four-wheeled, unpowered truck was mounted at the outer end of each frame. The bodywork, mounted above, swivelled on mounts on each of the two main frames. This was an identical layout to the better-known GG1 electric locomotives, but with four driven axles instead of six. Each driven wheel had two electric motors, each rated at 625 hp (466 kW), giving a total rating of 5,000 hp (3,700 kW) for the locomotive.

Although it had fewer driven wheels than the GG1, the total power output was slightly greater, thanks to newer and more powerful motors. Weight on the driven wheels was approximately 286,000 lb (130,000 kg)., compared to the GG1's 300,000 lb (140,000 kg), meaning that in similar conditions of adhesion the GG1 was slightly at an advantage in terms of applying power to the rail, but the difference was not great. Styling was also similar to the GG1's.
