= Pennsylvania Railroad locomotive classification =

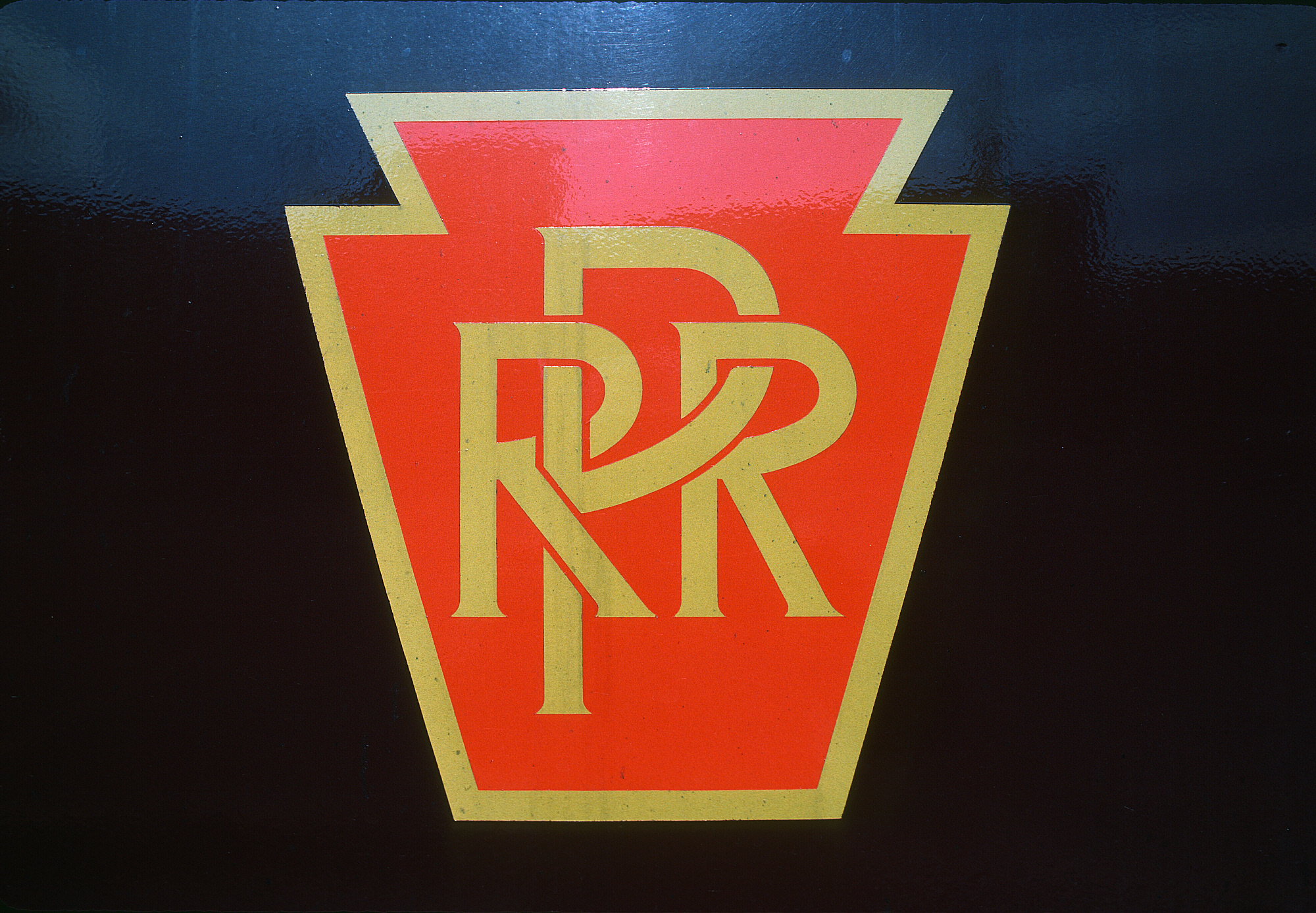
PRR 5898 Herald

Locomotive classification on the Pennsylvania Railroad took several forms. Early on, steam locomotives were given single-letter classes. As the 26 letters were quickly assigned, that scheme was abandoned for a more complex system. This was used for all of the PRR's steam locomotives, and — with the exception of the final type bought (the E44) — all electric locomotives also used this scheme.

== PRR steam and electric classification ==
=== A: 0-4-0 ===
Class A was the 0-4-0 type, an arrangement best suited to small switcher locomotives (known as "shifters" in PRR parlance). Most railroads abandoned the 0-4-0 after the 1920s, but the PRR kept it for use on small industrial branches, especially those with street trackage and tight turns.

- A1
- A2
- A3
- A4
- A5s
- A6

=== B: 0-6-0 ===
Class B comprised the 0-6-0 type, the most popular arrangement for switcher locomotives on the PRR.

- B1 (Steam)
- B1 (Electric)
- B2
- B3
- B4
- B5 - Rebuilt from class H1 and H2a 2-8-0
- B6
- B7 - Some rebuilt from class H3, H3a, and H3b 2-8-0
- B8
- B21
- B22
- B23
- B28s
- B29

=== C: 0-8-0 ===
Class C was assigned to the 0-8-0 type. These were very common on other railroads, but the PRR was not keen on them and only built a few. This was partly because the PRR used 2-8-0 "Consolidation" types for similar service.

- C1 - Largest 2-cylinder 0-8-0 ever built
- C29
- C30
- C31

=== D: 4-4-0 ===
Class D was the 4-4-0 "American" type, the most common arrangement in 19th Century American railroading. 4-4-0s stayed in service on the PRR in secondary work later than on most other railroads, and three were in use until after World War II

- D1
- D2
- D3
- D4
- D5
- D6
- D7
- D8
- D9
- D10
- D11
- D12
- D13
- D14
- D15 - Compound
- D16
- D21 - ex-Vandalia Railroad, built by Baldwin 1871-1873
- D22 - ex-Vandalia Railroad, built by Pittsburgh 1883-1889
- D23 - ex-Vandalia Railroad, built by Pittsburgh 1884
- D24 - ex-Vandalia Railroad, built by Rogers 1887
- D25 - ex-Vandalia Railroad, built by Pittsburgh 1890
- D26 - ex-Vandalia Railroad, built by Schenectady 1895-1899
- D30 - ex-Toledo, Walhonding Valley and Ohio Railroad, built by Rome 1890
- D31 - ex-Toledo, Walhonding Valley and Ohio Railroad, built 1892-1895
- D32 - Compound, ex-Toledo, Walhonding Valley and Ohio Railroad, built by Baldwin 1892
- D33
- D34 - ex-Cleveland and Marietta Railroad, built by Rome 1885
- D35 - ex-Cleveland and Marietta Railroad, built by Rome 1885
- D36 - ex-Cleveland and Marietta Railroad, built by Rogers 1885-1886
- D37 - ex-Cincinnati, Lebanon and Northern Railway, built by Baldwin 1894
- D38 - ex-Cincinnati, Lebanon and Northern Railway, built by Pittsburgh 1899
- D39 - ex-Grand Rapids and Indiana Railroad, built by Baldwin 1892-1893
- D61 - ex-Cleveland, Akron and Columbus Railway, built by Baldwin 1893
- "Odd D" #10003, an experimental electric locomotive.

=== E: 4-4-2 ===
The 4-4-2 "Atlantic" type was assigned class E. The PRR was an enthusiastic user of the Atlantic type in flatter country, and built some of the most advanced Atlantics used in the United States.

- E1
- E2
- E3
- E4
- E5
- E6
- E7
- E21
- E22
- E23
- E28 - Compound
- E29 - Compound
- "de Glehn" #2512, a single experimental compound locomotive

=== F: 2-6-0 ===
The 2-6-0 "Mogul" type was assigned class F. On the PRR, this type was used during the period of 1895–1925, approximately. They were mostly used to haul express freight, although some hauled suburban passenger trains.

- F1
- F2 - Compound
- F3
- F21
- F22
- F23
- F24
- F25
- F26
- F27
- F30
- F31
- F61

=== G: 4-6-0 ===
- G1
- G2
- G3
- G4
- G5 - Largest 10 wheeler built. PRR constructed 90 for use in commuter service and then built 30 for their subsidiary the Long Island RR.
- G53 - Owned By subsidiary Long Island RR

=== H: 2-8-0 ===
- H1
- H2
- H3
- H4
- H5
- H6
- H8
- H9
- H10

=== I: 2-10-0 ===
The 2-10-0 "Decapod" type was assigned class I. The PRR only owned one type of Decapod, class I1s, but they owned 598 of them, one of the largest classes of identical power in the United States.

- I1s/I1sa - heavy freight hauler.

=== J: 2-6-2 and 2-10-4 ===
Class J was first used for two experimental 2-6-2 "Prairie" locomotives built by ALCO in 1905. These were both withdrawn from service by the mid-1920s. In 1942, the PRR built 123 2-10-4 "Texas" type locomotives based on C&O plans; class J now being unoccupied, it was reused for them. The PRR J1 was an improved version of its C&O counterpart with more pulling power.

- J1 - 2-10-4 freight locomotives.
- J28 - experimental 2-6-2 locomotives.

=== K: 4-6-2 ===
The PRR assigned class K to the 4-6-2 "Pacific" type. The Pacific was the most common type of passenger locomotive on the Pennsylvania.

- K2 - 153 built at Altoona 1910-1911
- K3s - 30 built by Baldwin in 1913.
- K4 - 425 built by the PRR and Baldwin 1914-1928.
- K5 - 2 prototypes built
- K28s
- K29s

=== L: 2-8-2 ===
Class L was assigned to the 2-8-2 "Mikado" type.

- L1s - freight twin to the famed K4s Pacific (575 built)
- L2s - the USRA standard light Mikado (5 built for PRR).
- L5 - PRR 2nd generation DC electric locomotive.
- L6 - PRR freight AC electric locomotives.

=== M: 4-8-2 ===
- M1 - mixed-traffic Mountain type, latterly mostly used on fast freight.

=== N: 2-10-2 ===
- N1s - Lines West heavy freight locomotive.
- N2s - USRA Standard 2-10-2, also used on Lines West.

=== O: 4-4-4 ===
The 4-4-4 arrangement was rare anywhere, and on the PRR it was found only on eight experimental electric locomotives.

- O1 - experimental electric locomotives.

=== P: 4-6-4 ===
The 4-6-4 arrangement was seen on the PRR only on electric locomotives. As a steam locomotive arrangement, it was poorly suited to the PRR's mountainous terrain, wasting much potential adhesive weight on non-driven wheels. That it was so widely used by the rival New York Central would also likely have factored against PRR adoption.

- P5 - mixed-traffic electric locomotive, succeeded by the GG1.

=== Q: 4-4-6-4 or 4-6-4-4 ===
The Q class comprised what were effectively 4-10-4s with the driving axles split into two driven groups. The Q2 was the most powerful non-articulated steam locomotive ever built and also holds the record for highest horsepower recorded by any steam locomotive at 7,987 hp.

- Q1 - experimental duplex freight locomotive.
- Q2 - duplex freight locomotive.

=== R: 4-8-4 ===
The PRR never built any steam locomotives of the 4-8-4 "Northern" type, although the T1 duplexes were effectively a "Northern" with the driving wheels split into two groups.

- R1 - experimental electric locomotive, surpassed by the GG1.

=== S: 6-4-4-6 or 6-8-6 ===
Both S class locomotives were originally intended to only have four leading and trailing wheels, but for the S1 increases in weight required an additional axle at each end. In the case of the S2, it was due to wartime limits on the use of advanced steel alloys.

- S1 - experimental duplex express passenger locomotive.
- S2 - experimental steam turbine locomotive.

=== T: 4-4-4-4 ===
The duplex-drive T1 was the final class of steam locomotive constructed for the Pennsylvania Railroad, and possibly the most controversial.

- T1 - Duplex express passenger locomotive.

=== Compound classifications ===
The PRR classified articulated locomotives and joined locomotive units by using multiples of the previous classifications.

Non-Articulated steam:

- 1320 - 2-2-2-0 locomotive, based on the London and North Western Railway's Dreadnought Class locomotive. One built.

Articulated steam:

- CC1s - 0-8-8-0 Mallet locomotive. Treated as two 0-8-0s for classification. One built.
- CC2s - 0-8-8-0 Mallet locomotive. 10 built.
- HC1s - 2-8-8-0 simple articulated locomotive. The PRR's only main-line articulated. One built.
- HH1s - 2-8-8-2 Mallet locomotive. Treated for classification purposes as two 2-8-0s back to back.
- HH1 - 2-8-8-2 Norfolk & Western class Y3 borrowed by PRR during World War II.

Articulated electric:

- AA1 - experimental 0-4-4-0 or B-B electric locomotives.
- BB1 - two-unit prototype AC electric 0-6-0+0-6-0 switching locomotive, later split into single units as class B1.
- BB2 - two-unit 0-6-0+0-6-0 DC electric switching locomotives, later split into single units as class B1.
- BB3 - two-unit 0-6-0+0-6-0 DC electric switching locomotives for LIRR, later split into single units as class B3.
- DD1 - two-unit DC electric locomotive, two 4-4-0 half-locomotives semi-permanently coupled back to back. Served between Manhattan Transfer and Penn Station, and to Sunnyside Yard.
- DD2 - experimental mixed-traffic AC electric locomotive, similar in overall design and appearance to GG1.
- FF1 - 2-6-6-2 (1-C+C-1) experimental electric locomotive, 1917. Too powerful.
- FF2 - 2-6-6-2 motor-generator AC electric locomotives acquired second-hand from the Great Northern Railway (their classes Y1 and Y1a) in 1956.
- GG1 - express passenger and freight electric locomotive, highly successful.

== Non-standard electric classification ==
- E2b - experimental B-B General Electric-built AC electric locomotives (3 pairs built).
- E3b - experimental B-B-B Baldwin-Lima-Hamilton-Westinghouse AC/DC rectifier locomotives (1 pair built).
- E2c - experimental C-C Baldwin-Lima-Hamilton-Westinghouse AC/DC rectifier locomotives (1 pair built)
- E44 - 1960 C-C General Electric AC/DC rectifier freight locomotives.

The horsepower-based designation unique to the E44 would be retained and expanded by Penn Central to cover the former New Haven EF4s (E33) and EP5s (E40).

== Diesel classification ==
The Pennsylvania Railroad was rather slow to dieselize. By the end of WW2 they only had 18 units. However over the next 22 years they had acquired a total of 3,005 units. The railroad purchased locomotives from all major American locomotive manufacturers: Alco with 516 units, Baldwin with 643 units, EMD with 1,479 units, Fairbanks-Morse with 200 units, General Electric with 145 units, and Lima-Hamilton with 22 units. This diversity was a nightmare for the maintenance department as there was very little compatibility amongst the different builders.

The PRR's diesel classification system is as follows:
The first letter in the classification stood for the manufacturer;
- A - American Locomotive Company (ALCO)
- B - Baldwin Locomotive Works (BLW)
- E - Electro-Motive Division (EMD/EMC)
- G - General Electric (GE)
- F - Fairbanks-Morse (FM)
- L - Lima-Hamilton Corporation (LH)
The second and third letters represented the type of service;
- S - Switcher
- F - Freight
- P - Passenger
- PF - Dual Service/Mixed Traffic
- RS - Roadswitcher
- H - Helper
The next number(s) were for the locomotives horsepower rounded to the hundreds.
The last letter (if used), were for model variations.

=== American Locomotive Company (ALCO) ===
PRR Class	Builder’s Model	Build date	Total produced	Wheel arrangement	Service	Power output	Notes
AS6	S-1	1947–1951	40	B-B	Switcher	600 hp (450 kW)	
AS10	S-2	1948–1954	90	B-B	Switcher	1,000 hp (750 kW)	22 units MU class AS10m
AS10a	T-6	1958	6	B-B	Switcher	1,000 hp (750 kW)	
AF15	FA-1	1948–1950	8	B-B	Freight	1,500 hp (1,120 kW)	
AF15	FB-1	1948–1950	8	B-B	Freight	1,500 hp (1,120 kW)	
AF16	FA-2	1951	24	B-B	Freight	1,600 hp (1,190 kW)	
AF16	FA-2	1951	12	B-B	Freight	1,600 hp (1,190 kW)	
AFP20	PA-1	1947	10	A1A-A1A	Pass	2,000 hp (1,490 kW)	many converted to Freight
AFP20	PB-2	1947	5	A1A-A1A	Pass	2,000 hp (1,490 kW)	many converted to Freight
ARS10	RS-1	1948–1952	27	B-B	Freight	1,000 hp (750 kW)	5 units used in Pass service
ARS15	RS-2	1948	6	B-B	Freight	1,500 hp (1,120 kW)	ex D&H
ARS16	RS-3	1951–1955	115	B-B	Freight	1,600 hp (1,190 kW)	45 units used in Pass service
ARS16a	RSD-4	1952–1953	6	C-C	Freight	1,600 hp (1,190 kW)	
ARS16am	RSD-5	1952–1953	6	C-C	Freight	1,600 hp (1,190 kW)	
ARS18	RS-11	1956–1957	32	B-B	Freight	1,800 hp (1,340 kW)	
ARS18a	RSD-12	1957–1958	25	C-C	Freight	1,800 hp (1,340 kW)	
ARS20	RS-11	1956–1957	6	B-B	Freight	2,000 hp (1,490 kW)	
ARS24	RSD-15	1956	6	C-C	Freight	2,400 hp (1,790 kW)	
ARS24s	RSD-7	1955–1956	5	C-C	Pass	2,400 hp (1,790 kW)	
ARS24	RS-27	1962	15	B-B	Freight	2,400 hp (1,790 kW)	
AF24	C-424	1962	1	B-B	Freight	2,400 hp (1,790 kW)	
AF25	C-425	1964–1965	31	B-B	Freight	2,500 hp (1,860 kW)	
AF27	C-628	1965	15	C-C	Freight	2,750 hp (2,050 kW)	
AF30	C-630	1966	15	C-C	Freight	3,000 hp (2,240 kW)	
AF36	C-636	1968	15	C-C	Freight	3,600 hp (2,680 kW)	ordered but del to PC

=== Baldwin Locomotive Works (BLW) ===
PRR Class	Builder’s Model	Build date	Total produced	Wheel arrangement	Service	Power output	Notes
BS6	VO-660	1942–1945	12	B-B	Switcher	600 hp (450 kW)	
BS6	DS-4-4-660	1942–1945	99	B-B	Switcher	660 hp (490 kW)	
BS7	DS-4-4-750	1951	24	B-B	Switcher	750 hp (560 kW)	
BS7	S8	1951	7	B-B	Switcher	750 hp (560 kW)	
BS10	VO-1000	1943–1945	8	B-B	Switcher	1,000 hp (750 kW)	
BS10	DS-4-4-1000	1948–1950	137	B-B	Switcher	1,000 hp (750 kW)	
BS12	S-12	1951–1956	98	B-B	Switcher	1,200 hp (890 kW)	
BS24	RT-624	1951–1954	24	C-C	Transfer	2,400 hp (1,790 kW)	
BF15	DR-4-4-1500	1940–1950	34	B-B	Freight	1,500 hp (1,120 kW)	Cab (A) aka “Sharknose”
BF15	DR-4-4-1500	1940–1950	34	B-B	Freight	1,500 hp (1,120 kW)	Cab (B)
BF16	RF-16 (A)	1950–1952	72	B-B	Freight	1,600 hp (1,190 kW)	Cab (A) aka “Sharknose”
BF16	RF-16 (B)	1950–1952	30	B-B	Freight	1,600 hp (1,190 kW)	Cab (B)
BP60a	DR-12-8-3000	1947–1948	24	2-D-D-2	Pass	3,000 hp (2,240 kW)	converted to helper aka "Centipede"
BP20	DR-6-4-2000	1948	18	A1A-A1A	Pass	2,000 hp (1,490 kW)	Cab (A)
BP20	DR-6-4-2000	1948	9	A1A-A1A	Pass	2,000 hp (1,490 kW)	Cab (B)
BRS10	DRS-4-4-1000	1949–1950	6	B-B	Pass	1,000 hp (750 kW)	
BRS12	RS-12	1951–1954	8	B-B	Pass	1,200 hp (890 kW)	3 units used in Pass service
BRS15	DRS-4-4-1500	1950	8	B-B	Pass	1,500 hp (1,120 kW)	
BRS16	AS-616	1953–1955	28	C-C	Pass	1,600 hp (1,190 kW)	16 units used in Pass service
BRS24	RT-624	1951–1954	22	C-C	Transfer	2,400 hp (1,790 kW)	

=== Lima-Hamilton (LH) ===
PRR Class	Builder's Model	Build date	Total produced	Wheel arrangement	Service	Power output	Notes
LRS25	LT-2500	1950-1951	22	C-C	Transfer	2,400 hp (1,790 kW)	

=== General Electric (GE) ===
PRR Class	Builder’s Model	Build date	Total produced	Wheel arrangement	Service	Power output	Notes
GS4	44 Ton	1948–1950	46	B-B	Switcher	400 hp (300 kW)	
GF25	U25B	1965	59	B-B	Freight	2,500 hp (1,860 kW)	
GF25a	U25C	1965	20	C-C	Freight	2,500 hp (1,860 kW)	
GF28a	U28C	1966	15	C-C	Freight	2,800 hp (2,090 kW)	
GF30a	U30C	1967	5	C-C	Freight	3,000 hp (2,240 kW)	

=== Electro-Motive Division (EMC/EMD) ===
PRR Class	Builder’s Model	Build date	Total produced	Wheel arrangement	Service	Power output	Notes
ES6	SW	1937	12	B-B	Switcher	600 hp (450 kW)	
ES6	SW1	1942–1950	85	B-B	Switcher	600 hp (450 kW)	
ES10	NW2	1941–1948	32	B-B	Switcher	1,000 hp (750 kW)	
ES12	SW7-SW9	1950–1953	84	B-B	Switcher	1,200 hp (890 kW)	
ES12	SW1200	1957	35	B-B	Switcher	1,200 hp (890 kW)	
EF15	F3A,F7A	1947–1952	203	B-B	Freight	1,500 hp (1,120 kW)	Cab A unit
EF15	F3B,F7B	1947–1952	107	B-B	Freight	1,500 hp (1,120 kW)	Cab B unit
EPF15	FP7A	1952	40	B-B	Pass	1,500 hp (1,120 kW)	Cab A unit
EPF15	FP7B	1952	14	B-B	Pass	1,500 hp (1,120 kW)	Cab B unit
EP20	E7A	1945–1949	46	A1A-A1A	Pass	2,000 hp (1,490 kW)	Cab A unit
EP20	E7B	1945–1949	14	A1A-A1A	Pass	2,000 hp (1,490 kW)	Cab B unit
EP22	E8A	1950–1952	74	A1A-A1A	Pass	2,250 hp (1,680 kW)	Cab A unit
ERS15	GP7	1952–1953	66	B-B	Freight	1,500 hp (1,120 kW)	10 units used in Pass service
ERS15ax	SD7	1953	2	B-B	Freight	1,500 hp (1,120 kW)	
ERS17	GP9	1955–1959	310	B-B	Freight	1,750 hp (1,300 kW)	40 units no cab
ERS17a	SD9	1957–1958	25	C-C	Freight	1,750 hp (1,300 kW)	
EF22	GP30	1963	52	B-B	Freight	2,250 hp (1,680 kW)	
EF25	GP35	1964–1965	119	B-B	Freight	2,500 hp (1,860 kW)	
EF25a	SD35	1965	40	C-C	Freight	2,500 hp (1,860 kW)	
EF30a	SD40	1966	65	C-C	Freight	3,000 hp (2,240 kW)	
EF36	SD45	1966	65	C-C	Freight	3,600 hp (2,680 kW)	
EF20a	GP38	1967	5	B-B	Freight	2,000 hp (1,490 kW)	Built for PRSL

=== Fairbanks-Morse (FM) ===
PRR Class	Builder’s Model	Build date	Total produced	Wheel arrangement	Service	Power output	Notes
FS10	H10-44	1948–1949	55	B-B	Switcher	1,000 hp (750 kW)	
FS12	H12-44	1952–1954	16	B-B	Switcher	1,200 hp (890 kW)	
FF20	Erie Built (A)	1947–1948	36	A1A-A1A	Freight	2,000 hp (1,490 kW)	Cab A
FF20	Erie Built (B)	1947–1948	12	A1A-A1A	Freight	2,000 hp (1,490 kW)	Cab B
FF16	CFA-16-4	1950	16	B-B	Freight	1,600 hp (1,190 kW)	Cab A
FF16	CFB-16-4	1950	8	B-B	Freight	1,600 hp (1,190 kW)	Cab B
FRS-16	H16-44	1952	10	B-B	Freight	1,600 hp (1,190 kW)	
FRS-20	H20-44	1948–1951	38	B-B	Freight	2,000 hp (1,490 kW)	
FRS-24	H24-66	1953–1954	9	C-C	Freight	2,400 hp (1,790 kW)	aka Train Master
