= L6 =

L6 may refer to:

- L6, a variety of low-alloy special purpose steel
- Mauritania Airlines International (IATA code: L6, ICAO code: MAI)
- Straight-6 engine
- L^{6}, Bell Telephone Laboratories' Low-Level Linked List Language
- L^{6}, instance of mathematical L^{p} space
- L 6 (keelboat), class of sailboat
- ISO/IEC 8859-10 (Latin-6), an 8-bit character encoding
- Lower sixth (grade 12) in British secondary education
- L6, an S-Bahn line of the Léman Express in Switzerland and France

== Products by model number ==
- Gibson L6-S guitar
- Motorola SLVR L6 phone
- PRR L6 locomotives
- L6 Wombat firearm
- Li L6 electric SUV

Aircraft:

- Daimler D.I fighter
- Interstate Cadet L-6A light passenger plane
- Lucas L6, French light aircraft

== See also ==
- 6L (disambiguation)
