= Transfer switcher =

Type of railroad locomotive

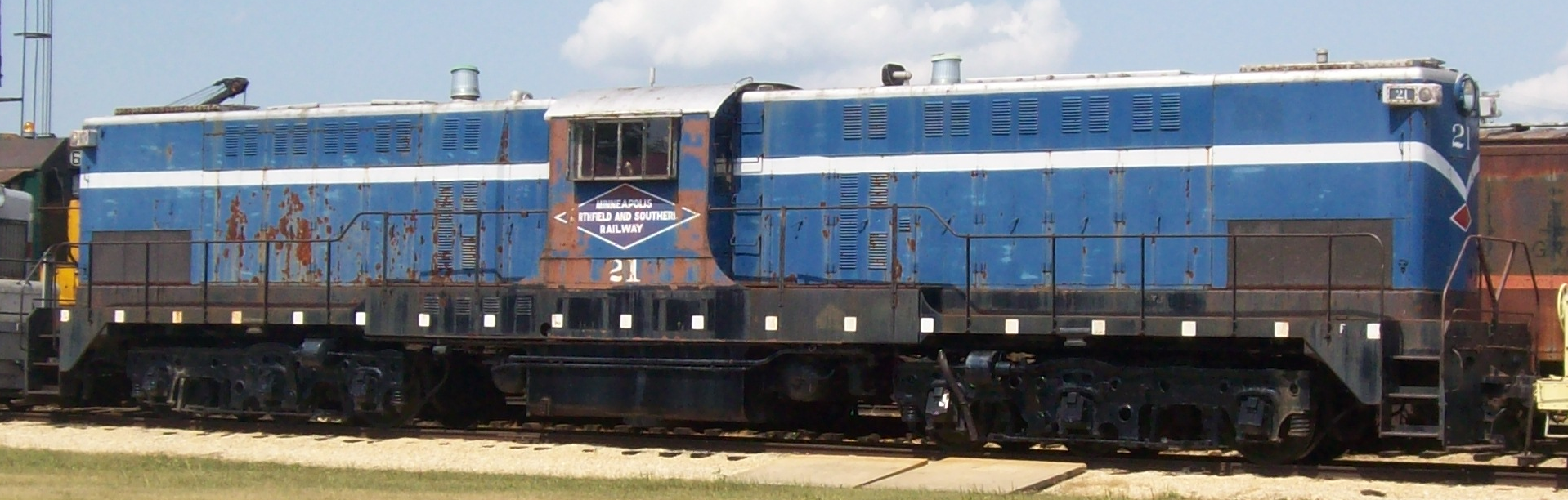
Preserved Baldwin DT-6-6-2000 transfer locomotive at the Illinois Railway Museum.

A transfer switcher was a type of railroad locomotive specifically designed to perform "transfer" work in which freight cars are transported between two freight yards in a large terminal area.

== Design ==
As transfer work required high pulling power but not much speed, the general design of a transfer locomotive consisted of two engines with high-horsepower on an elongated locomotive frame, gearing designed for low speeds, and several driving axles, but were generally built without dynamic braking or multiple unit capability. In addition to the "center cab" design, transfer locomotives were also built in the form of road switchers and drawbar-coupled cow and calf switcher sets.

=== Center cab ===
The "center cab" configuration is probably the best remembered transfer locomotive design, as the majority of these locomotives were built for transfer work. The first of the "center cab" locomotives was simply designated the T, and was a one-of-a-kind locomotive, built as a collaboration by the Electro Motive Corporation, St. Louis Car Company and General Electric for the Illinois Central Railroad in 1936.

== Production ==
Baldwin Locomotive Works and Lima-Hamilton (which would later merge to become Baldwin-Lima-Hamilton) produced the majority of these units, with the former producing 70 Baldwin DT-6-6-2000/BLH RT-624 locomotives, and the latter producing 22 Lima A-3177 locomotives between 1946 and 1954.

== Preservation ==
Only one surviving example of these locomotives is known to exist. Minneapolis, Northfield and Southern Railroad DT-6-6-2000 #21 is preserved at the Illinois Railway Museum in Union, Illinois.
