= E1 class =

E1 class or Class E1 may refer to:

- E1-class Melbourne tram
- LB&SCR E1 class, 0-6-0T steam locomotives
- NER Class E1, 0-6-0T steam locomotives
- Pennsylvania Railroad class E1, 4-4-2 steam locomotives
