= 1907 in rail transport =

This article lists events related to rail transport that occurred in 1907.

== Events ==
=== February events ===
- February – Great Western Railway of England begins production of Star Class 4-6-0 locomotives at its Swindon Works, beginning a series of successful 4-cylinder designs.

=== March events ===
- March 4 – The first section of the Market–Frankford Line opens in Philadelphia from 69th Street Terminal to a loop around City Hall at 15th Street.

=== April events ===
- April 15 – William Nelson Page is named president of the newly formed Virginian Railway.

=== May events ===
- May 18 – The Ravenswood branch of the old Northwestern Elevated system of the Chicago 'L' (today's Brown Line), opens for service between the Loop and Western and Leland Avenues in Lincoln Square.
- May 22 – Philadelphia & Western Railroad makes its inaugural run.

=== June events ===
- June 20 – Construction begins on what would become the Causeway Street Elevated streetcar line in Boston.
- June 22 - Opening of the Charing Cross, Euston & Hampstead Railway in London, a deep tube railway which now forms part of the London Underground's Northern line.
- June 26 - The Pennsylvania Tunnel & Terminal Railroad is formed from the merger of the Pennsylvania, New Jersey & New York Railroad and the Pennsylvania, New York & Long Island Railroad; the new railroad company is chartered to build the New York Tunnel Extensions beneath the Hudson River that will connect the Pennsylvania Railroad to Pennsylvania Station in New York City.

=== July events ===
- July 1 – All New York Central Railroad services into and out of Grand Central Terminal in New York City are electrically hauled.

=== August events ===
- August 4 – Following a locomotive derailment, the railway bridge over the Loire at Les Ponts-de-Cé in France collapses. 27 are killed. The bridge reopens a year later.
- August 29 – Due to faulty design, the cantilever bridge over the St Lawrence River at Quebec City collapses while being built. Between 70 and 84 workers are killed. It will take 10 years to rebuild and complete the project.

=== October events ===
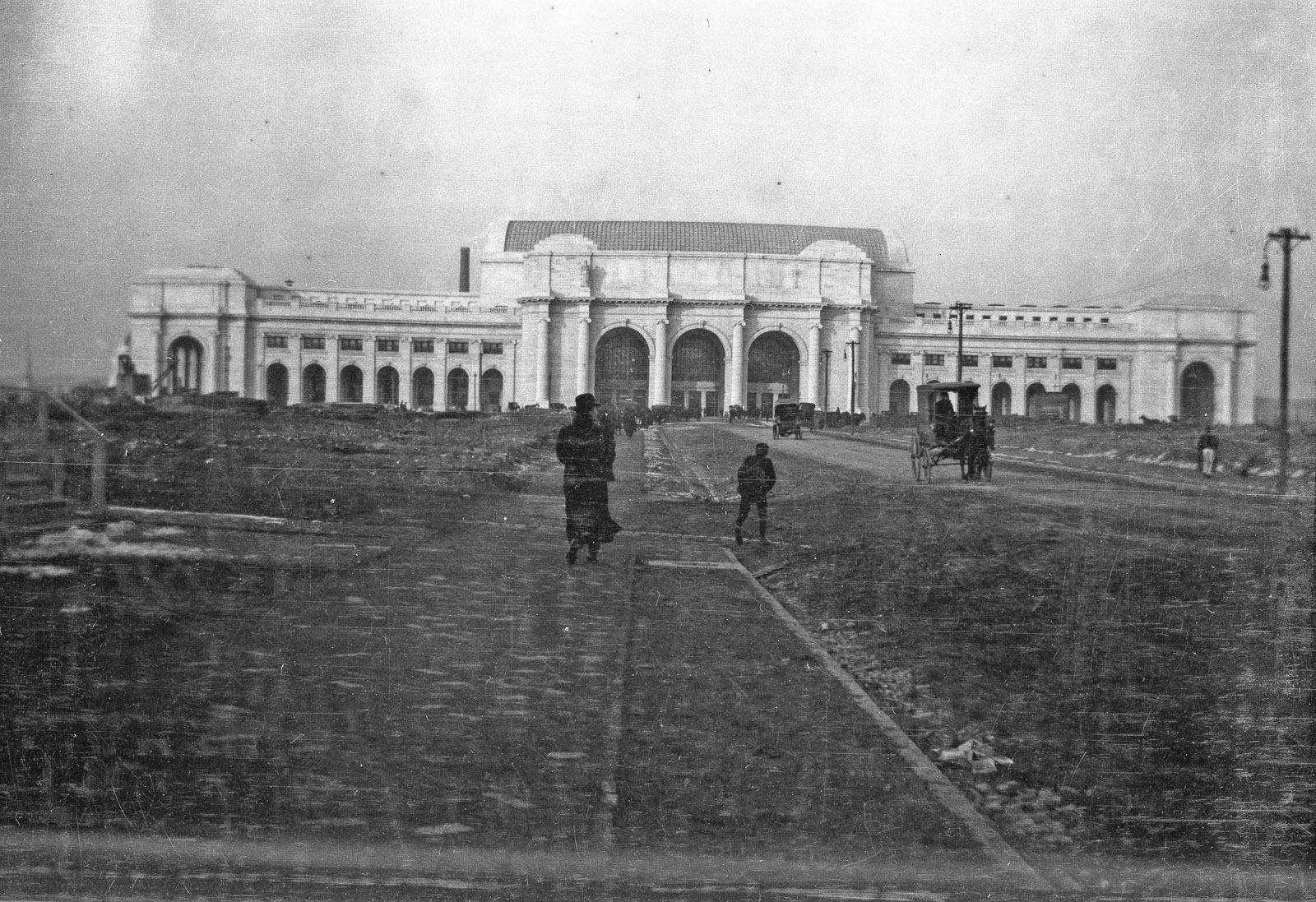
Washington Union Station, c. January 1908

- October 1
  - Pacific Fruit Express (PFE) begins operation with a fleet of 6,600 refrigerator cars.
  - The Empire of Japan completes the nationalization of nationwide 17 private railroads.
- October 15 – 18 die as a result of the Shrewsbury rail accident on the London & North Western Railway when a sleeping car train is derailed passing through Shrewsbury station, England, at excessive speed.
- October 27 – Washington Union Station although still unfinished, opens.

=== November events ===
- November 7 – Jesús García Corona is blown up driving a burning dynamite train away from a populated area of Nacozari, Sonora.

=== December events ===
- December 8 – The Southern Pacific Bay Shore Cut-Off is opened for revenue service between San Francisco and San Bruno, California.
- December 14 – The Ravenswood extension on what is now the Brown Line opens between Western Avenue and the current terminal at Kimball and Lawrence Avenues in Albany Park.

=== Unknown date events ===
- Government of India purchases most major railway companies and leases them back to private operators.
- Electrification of the New York, New Haven, and Hartford Railroad: The New York, New Haven & Hartford Railroad electrifies its mainline between Stamford and Woodlawn using a high-voltage (11 kV) AC single-phase 25 Hz overhead line system with a triangular cross-section catenary.
- The Deepwater Railway and the Tidewater Railway combine to form the Virginian Railway.
- Stearns Manufacturing Company is reorganized as Heisler Locomotive Works.
- The Apalachicola Northern Railroad runs its first train northward from Apalachicola, Florida.
- Edward Harriman removes Stuyvesant Fish from the presidency of the Illinois Central.
- Pennsylvania Railroad builds its third experimental electric locomotive, number 10003, the forerunner of the Pennsylvania Railroad class DD1 class of locomotives.
- The Lackawanna Railroad opens its Beaux Arts station in Hoboken, NJ.

== Births ==
=== June births ===
- June 2 - Eric Treacy, British Anglican bishop and railway photographer (died 1978).

=== November births ===
- November 1 - Terence Cuneo, British railway artist (died 1996).

== Deaths ==
=== May deaths ===
- May 19 - Benjamin Baker, British civil engineer, designer of the Forth Railway Bridge (born 1840).

=== October deaths ===
- October 3 – Jacob Nash Victor, oversaw construction for the California Southern Railroad from San Diego through Cajon Pass to Barstow, California (b. 1835).
