= J28 =

J28 may refer to:

- J/28, an American sailboat
- County Route J28 (California)
- de Havilland J 28 Vampire, a British jet fighter in service with the Swedish Air Force
- Jacks, Twos, and Eights, a card game
- Pennsylvania Railroad class J28, an American steam locomotive
- Square orthobicupola, a Johnson solid (J_{28})
