= Pennsylvania Railroad class B1 (electric) =

PRR B1
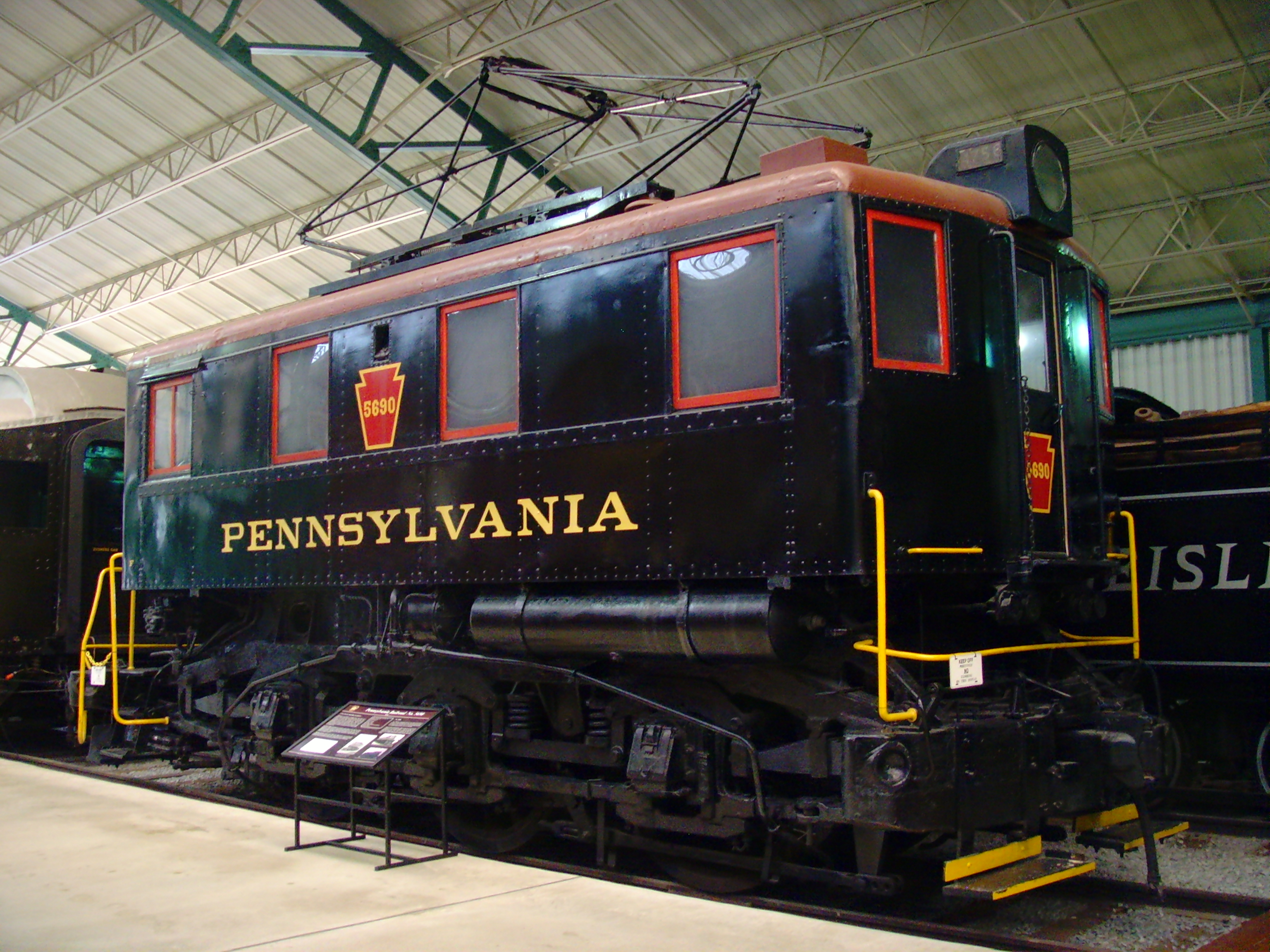
- 5690 preserved in Railroad Museum of Pennsylvania
Type and origin
- Power type: Electric
- Builder: Altoona Works; In association with: Westinghouse; Allis-Chalmers
- Build date: 1926-1935
- Total produced: BB1: 2 (paired); BB2: 12 (paired); BB3: 14 (paired); B1: 14; Total: 42
Specifications
- Configuration
  - Whyte: 6wOE
  - AAR: C
  - UIC: Co
- Gauge: 4 ft 8 1/2 in (1,435 mm) standard gauge
- Driver dia.: 62 in (1,575 mm)
- Length: 31 ft 6 in (9.60 m)
- Height: 15 ft 0 in (4.57 m)
- Loco weight: 157,000 lb (71,000 kilograms; 71 metric tons)
- Electric system/s: 11 kV 25 hz AC; Catenary; 650 V DC; Third rail (BB2)
- Current pickups: Pantograph, Contact shoe (BB2)
- Traction motors: 3× 233 hp (174 kW)
- Transmission: Resistance controlled DC or tap changer controlled AC supplied to AC-DC universal motors directly geared to the axles
Performance figures
- Maximum speed: 25 mph (40 km/h)
- Power output: 700 hp (520 kW)
- Tractive effort: 39,250 lbf (174.6 kN)
Career
- Disposition: one preserved, remainder scrapped

The Pennsylvania Railroad's class B1 comprised 42 electric switcher locomotives built between 1926 and 1935. They were of 0-6-0 wheel arrangement in the Whyte notation with 700 horsepower. As built, the first 28 locomotives in the 1926 order formed semi-permanently coupled pairs grouped in three classes.

The first, class BB1, were AC powered and served as prototypes. The second, class BB2, were DC powered and served in the New York Terminal district, specifically between Sunnyside Yard and New York Penn Station. The third, class BB3, was AC powered and built for the Long Island Rail Road's electrified freight operation on the Bay Ridge Branch. In 1934 a follow-up order of 14 locomotives were built as single unit class B1 for the expanding main line AC electrification system. In addition to these new units all previous BB classes were split into single units and the BB2 class were re-powered for AC operation as that system replaced the old 650 V DC system in the New York terminal. At this point all 42 units were re-classed as PRR B1.

Most of the B1 fleet spent its time shuttling trains around Sunnyside Yard or between there and Penn Station. Other B1s were assigned to the Penn Coach Yard at Philadelphia 30th Street Station and a few units even made their way to the PRR Harrisburg Station. As passenger traffic decreased in the 1950s and 1960s the need for dedicated electric switchers diminished with only the Sunnyside B1s surviving into the Penn Central era. After retirement all B1s were scrapped except for a single example preserved at the Railroad Museum of Pennsylvania.

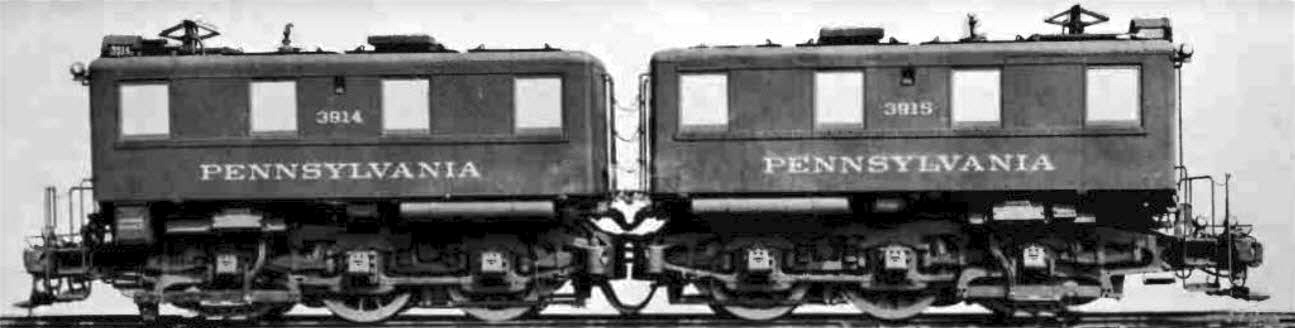
BB2 with sections No. 3914 and 3915 fitted at delivery with 3rd rail equipment.

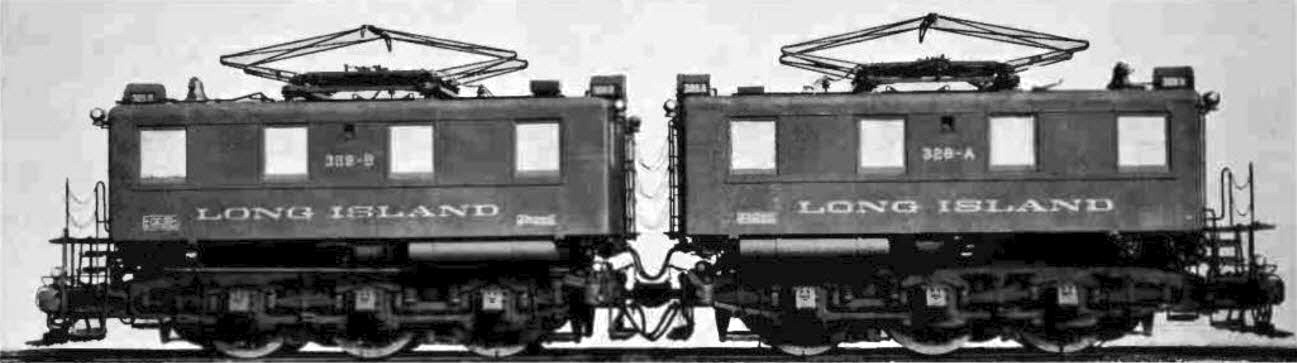
Long Island BB3 with section No. 328-A and 328-B used for freight trains on the Bay Ridge Branch.
