= Pennsylvania Railroad class H6 =

Type of steam locomotive

Pennsylvania Railroad H6
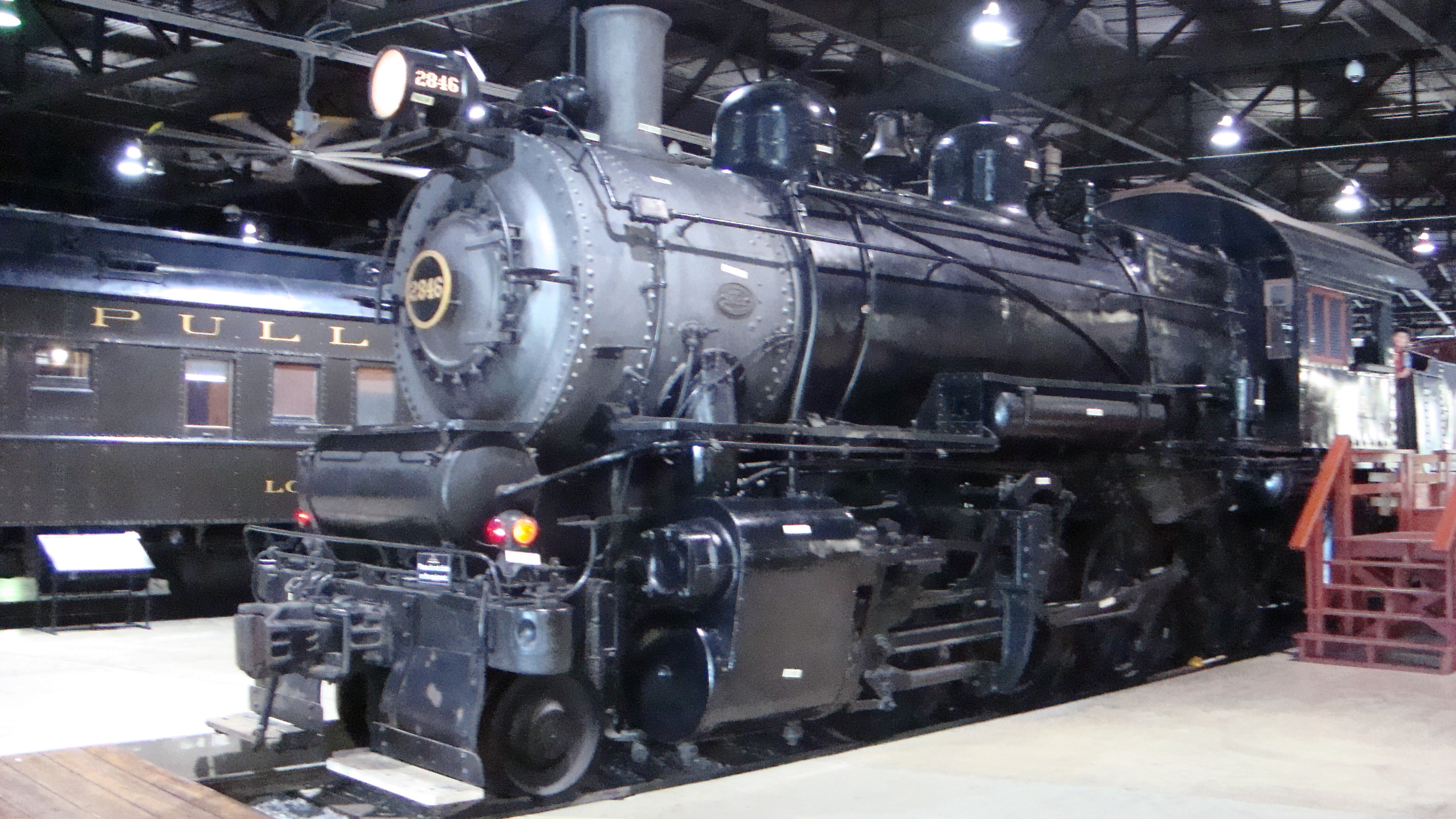
- Pennsy 2846 at the Railroad Museum of Pennsylvania
Type and origin
- Power type: Steam
- Builder: PRR Altoona Works, Baldwin Locomotive Works, Alco -P
- Build date: H6: 1899-1901; H6a: 1901-1905; H6b: 1905–1913
- Total produced: H6: 65 H6a: 1,041 H6b: 601 Total: 1,707
- Number rebuilt: 699 to H6sa/H6sb
Specifications
- Configuration
  - Whyte: 2-8-0
- Gauge: 4 ft 8 1/2 in (1,435 mm)
- Leading dia.: 36 in (0.91 m)
- Driver dia.: 56 in (1.42 m)
- Length: 65 ft 11 in (20.09 m) (including 70F70 tender)
- Adhesive weight: 180,000 lb (81,650 kg)
- Loco weight: 204,800 lb (92,900 kg)
- Total weight: 343,600 lb (155,900 kg)
- Fuel type: Coal
- Fuel capacity: 29,200 lb (13,200 kg)
- Water cap.: 7,200 US gal (27,000 L; 6,000 imp gal)
- Firebox
  - Grate area: H6: 33.3 sq ft (3.09 m^{2}); Others: 49.0 sq ft (4.55 m^{2})
- Boiler pressure: 195 psi (13.7 kgf/cm^{2})
- Cylinders: Two, outside
- Cylinder size: H6/H6a/H6b: 22 in × 28 in (560 mm × 710 mm); H6sa/H6sb: 23 in × 28 in (580 mm × 710 mm)
Performance figures
- Maximum speed: 50–60 mph (80–97 km/h)
- Tractive effort: H6: 42,717 lbf (190.01 kN); H6a/H6b: 42,168 lbf (187.57 kN); H6sa/H6sb: 43,841 lbf (195.01 kN)
Career
- Operators: Pennsylvania Railroad; Baltimore and Ohio Railroad; South Manchuria Railway; Manchukuo National Railway; China Railway
- Class: PRR: H6(a/b/sa/sb); B&O: E-24(a); SMR/MNR: ソリサ (Sorisa); CR: KD10
- Nicknames: ペンソリ Pensori
- Consolidation Freight Locomotive No. 2846
- U.S. National Register of Historic Places
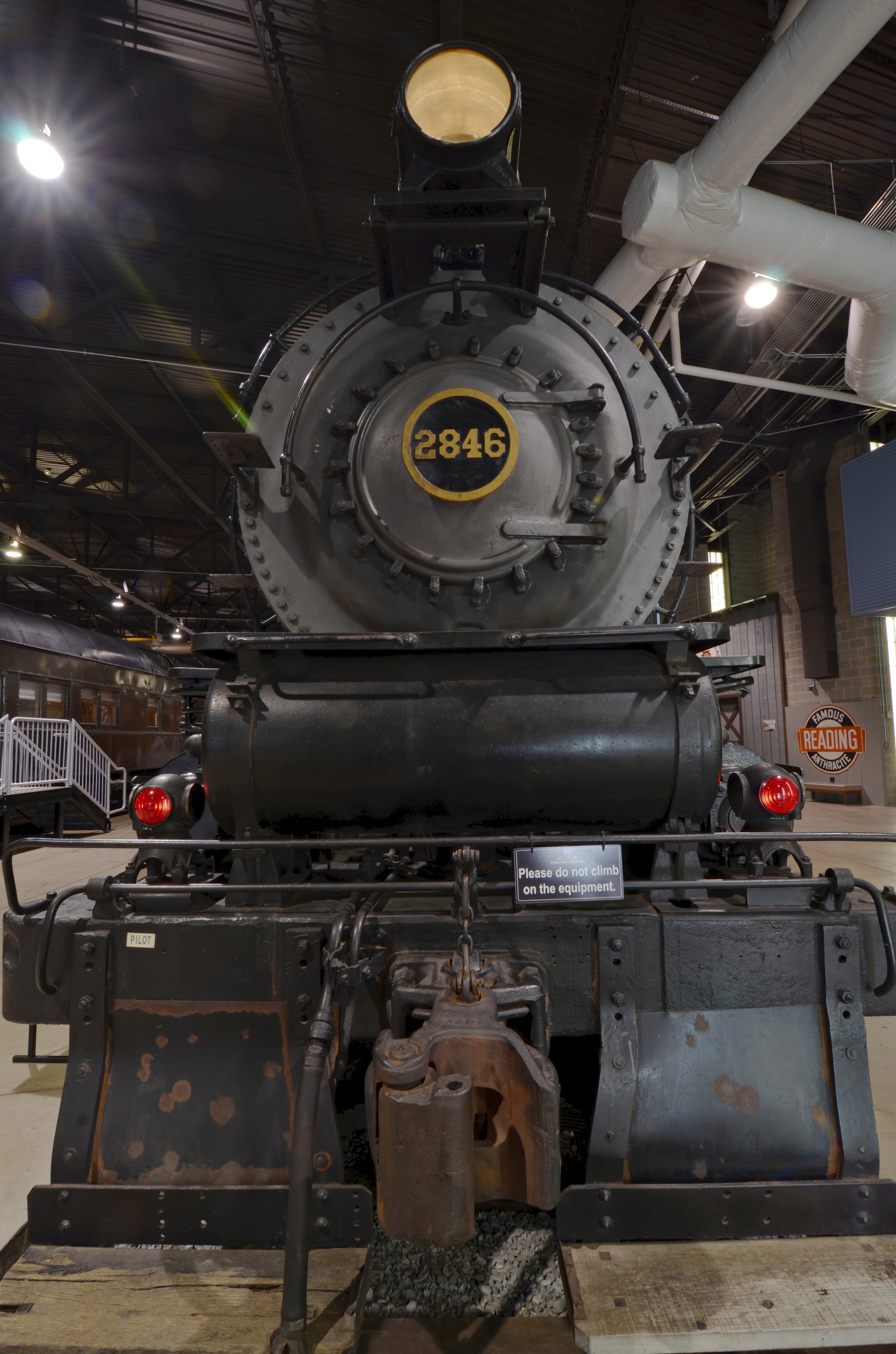

- Location within Pennsylvania Location within the United States
- Nearest city: Strasburg, Pennsylvania
- Coordinates: 39°58′56″N 76°9′40″W
- Area: 0.1 acres (0.040 ha)
- Built: 1905
- Architect: Baldwin Locomotive Works
- MPS: Pennsylvania Railroad Rolling Stock TR
- NRHP reference No.: 79002263
- Added to NRHP: December 17, 1979
- Retired: 1953-1958
- Preserved: PRR 2846
- Disposition: 1 preserved, remainder scrapped

The Pennsylvania Railroad's class H6, H6a, and H6b steam locomotives were of the 2-8-0 "Consolidation" freight type locomotive. With a combined total of 1,707 units, they represented the largest (most numerous) locomotive class on the Pennsylvania Railroad and the largest single class of steam locomotives operated in North America.

In terms of total production, they were the second-largest class built in North America, surpassed only by the USATC S160 class 2-8-0, of which 2,120 were constructed and deployed overseas, for wartime service. The three subclasses had the following numbers:

Class	Firebox	Grate Area	Tractive Force	Driver Size	#Built	Years Built
H6	narrow	33.3 sq ft (3.09 m^{2})	42,717 lbf (190.01 kN)	56 in (1,400 mm)	65	1899−01
H6a	wide	49.0 sq ft (4.55 m^{2})	42,168 lbf (187.57 kN)	56 in (1,400 mm)	1,041	1901−05
H6b	wide	49.0 sq ft (4.55 m^{2})	42,168 lbf (187.57 kN)	56 in (1,400 mm)	601	1905−13

In the 1920s, 699 H6a and H6b had superheaters added, and cylinder size increased from 22 in (560 mm) to 23 in (580 mm). These rebuilt units were reclassified to H6sa and H6sb.

In the early 20th century, Class H6 were used throughout the system as mainline freight haulers, on local freights, and as switchers in yards. They were frequently seen double- and tripleheading long freight trains up the steep grades on the Pennsy. With the delivery of larger freight locomotives such as the H8/9/10, L1s, I1sa, and others, Pennsylvania's massive fleet of H6 class were pushed to serving local freights, branchline duties, or scrapped.

During the period when the PRR was building the H-6 class, the railroad had effective stock control of the Baltimore and Ohio Railroad, and installed a PRR vice-president Leonor F. Loree, as president of the B&O. Subsequently, the B&O bought a large group of identical locomotives from the American Locomotive Company; these were initially classified class I-4, later becoming class E-24. The E-24 class had many variations, some being converted to switchers, or receiving superheaters and new valve chests. The E-24a was equivalent to the PRR H-6sb. None of the B&O E-24 class survived to the diesel era.

== Fate ==
Nearly all non-superheated H6, H6a, H6b were scrapped prior to 1930. Majority of the superheated H6sas were scrapped between 1929-1935, with all but 2 of the 154 H6sas gone by 1935 (#1055 scrapped 1/36, #3084 scrapped 12/38). The 532 superheated H6sbs fared better, with roughly 2/3 of the roster struck off the list between 1933-1939, and the remaining 1/3 of the roster scrapped in the late 40s, after the war. Only a handful lasted into the 1950s.

== China ==
Around 1938, thirty H6sb were sold second-hand to the South Manchuria Railway (Mantetsu), which designated them Sorisa (ソリサ) class (Sori, from "Consolidation", and sa, from san, "three", to indicate the third class of Consolidation-type locomotives operated by Mantetsu). To distinguish these from the British-made Sorisa 1−7, the H6sb were nicknamed ペンソリ Pensori (Pennsylvania Consolidation). Of these, fifteen were taken up by Mantetsu, which numbered them ソリサ8 through ソリサ22, whilst the other fifteen were assigned to the Manchukuo National Railway, where they were numbered ソリサ547 through ソリサ561.

After the end of the Pacific War, both Mantetsu and the Manchukuo National were absorbed by the China Railway, which designated them class KD10.

== Survivors ==
PRR #2846, an H6sb built in 1905 by the Baldwin Locomotive Works, has been preserved by the Railroad Museum of Pennsylvania with two other examples of the H class. #2846 was added to the National Register of Historic Places in 1979 as Consolidation Freight Locomotive No. 2846.
