= Pennsylvania Railroad class A3 =

Pennsylvania Railroad A3
Type and origin
- Builder: Altoona Works
- Total produced: 81
Specifications
- Configuration
  - Whyte: 0-4-0
  - UIC: B
- Gauge: 4 ft 8 1/2 in (1,435 mm) standard gauge
- Driver dia.: 4 ft 2 in (1.270 m)
- Boiler pressure: 140 psi (0.97 MPa) (production series)
- Cylinders: 2, outside
- Cylinder size: 17 in × 24 in (432 mm × 610 mm)
Career
- Operators: Pennsylvania Railroad
- Disposition: All scrapped

The Pennsylvania Railroad (PRR) A3 was a class of 0-4-0 steam locomotives built at Altoona Works between 1895 until 1905. The A3s were used as switchers for railroad cars at various PRR yards. Later, some A3s were converted to A3a, which had saddle tanks instead of tenders. The A3s were retired by 1920s, when the railroad introduced the much stronger class A5s. All members of the A3 class were scrapped.

== Model locomotives ==
The A3 has become the basis of a popular 3.5-inch gauge model locomotive, due to the beginner-friendly designs created by Kozo Hiraoka.
