= 1935 in rail transport =

This article lists events related to rail transport that occurred in 1935.

== Events ==
=== January events ===
- January 2 – Chicago & North Western Railway begins 400 passenger train service between Chicago, Illinois, and Saint Paul, Minnesota; it was so named because the 400 mile trip was intended to take 400 minutes, though that pace wasn't quite reached until a few months later. Still, it was believed to be the fastest train in the world over a distance greater than 177 miles (285 km).
- January 28 – To mark completion of the electric line from Washington, D.C. to New York City, the Pennsylvania Railroad runs a special train hauled by Pennsylvania Railroad 4800, the electric locomotive making a round trip from Washington to Philadelphia setting a speed record on the return run of 1 hour 50 minutes. The line, with the GG1 locomotives, begins regular revenue service on February 10.
- January 31 – Union Pacific's M-10000 enters service as the City of Salina between Salina, Kansas, and Kansas City. The 116 seat train carries an average 280 passengers per round trip.

=== February events ===
- February – Electro-Motive Corporation produces the new company's first Winton-engined diesel locomotives.

=== March events ===
- March 20 – Kotoku Line, Takamatsu to Tokushima route officially completed with regular operation service to start in Shikoku Island, Japan.
- March 23 – The North Manchuria Railway, the former Chinese Eastern Railway within the Japanese puppet state of Manchukuo, is sold by the Soviet Union to the Manchukuo Government; it is then merged into the Manchukuo National Railway and converted from Russian to standard gauge on August 31 between 05:00 and 08:00 hours.
- March 24 – Pennsylvania Station in Newark, New Jersey, opens.
- March 27 – Electro-Motive Corporation breaks ground in McCook, Illinois, for their new locomotive factory.
- March 30 – The first section of the Itō Line, connecting Atami and Ajiro in Japan, is opened.
- March 31 – The Glasgow Subway in Scotland is converted from a cable car system to a third-rail electric system (inner circle; outer circle completed December 5).

=== April events ===
- April 1 – The Flying Yankee trainset enters service on the Boston & Maine and Maine Central railroads between Portland, Maine, Boston, Massachusetts, and Bangor, Maine.
- April 21 – The Chicago, Burlington & Quincy Railroad's Twin Zephyrs enter revenue service between Chicago, Illinois, and the Twin Cities.

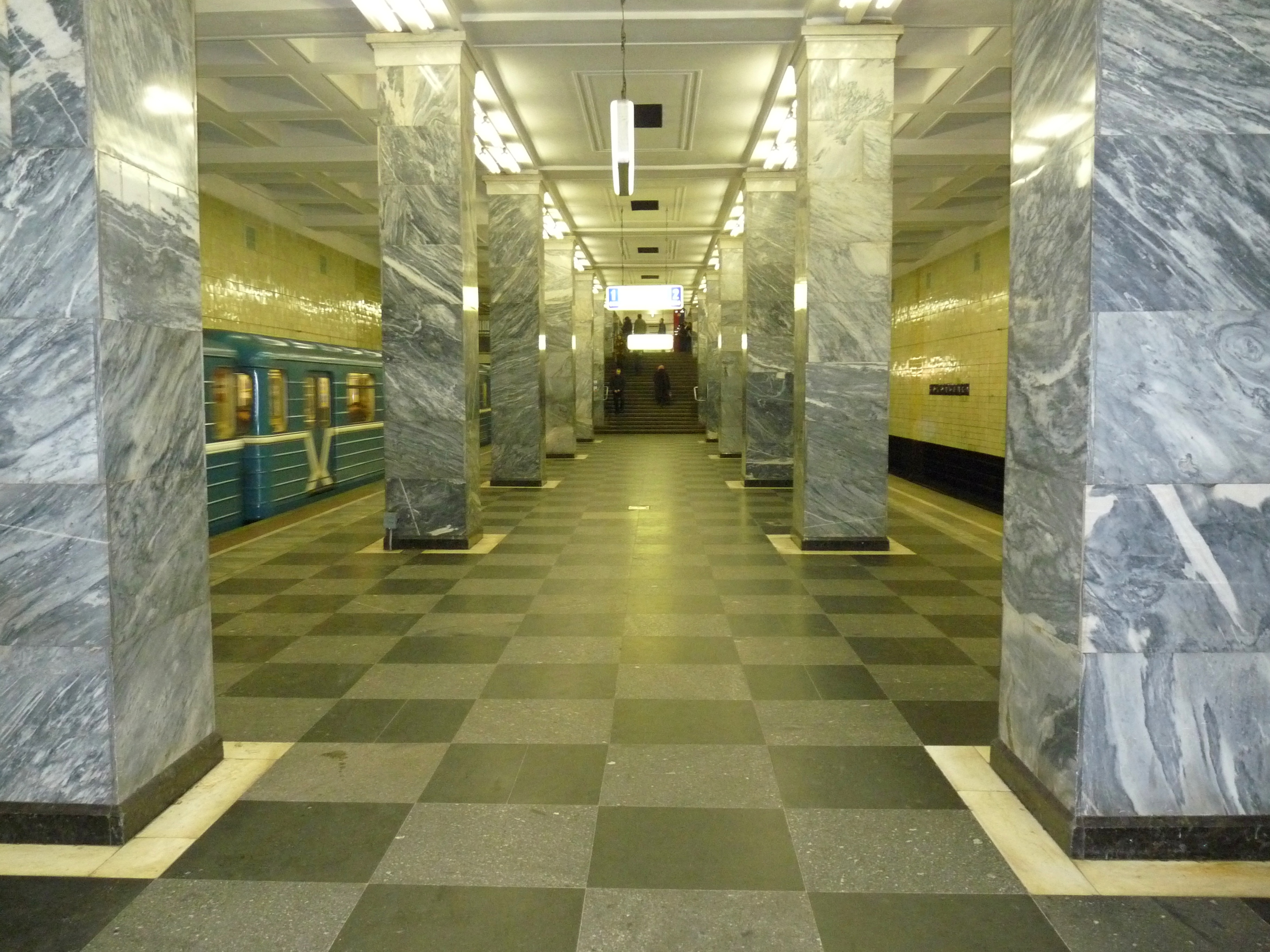
Sokolniki station, Moscow Metro

=== May events ===
- May 15 – The first line of the Moscow Metro is opened to the public at 7 am. The line is 11 km long, and includes 13 stations. It connects Sokolniki to Park Kultury with a branch from Okhotny Ryad to Smolenskaya.
- May 29 – The Milwaukee Road inaugurates Hiawatha passenger train service between Chicago, Illinois, and St Paul, Minnesota.

=== June events ===
- June 5 – The New Haven Railroad introduces its double-ended Comet passenger train between Boston, Massachusetts, and Providence, Rhode Island.
- June 6 – Union Pacific’s M-10001 enters Chicago, Illinois to Rose City service as the “Streamlined City of Portland”. The 2,272-mile route was covered in 39.75 hours, 18 hours faster than the previous best time.
- June 22 – Kerr's Miniature Railway opens at Arbroath. It will be the oldest public miniature railway in Scotland when closed in 2020.
- June 29 – The last scheduled train runs on the Maine narrow gauge Sandy River and Rangeley Lakes Railroad.

=== July events ===
- July 1 – The New York Central Lines (subsidiary companies) are renamed the New York Central System.
- July 24 – First permanent children's railway is opened in Tbilisi, USSR.
- July 29 – Two American Car & Foundry built, Otto Kuhler styled "Rebels" are put in service on the Gulf, Mobile and Northern Railroad, ending steam powered passenger service on that road.

=== August events ===
- August 18 – In a meeting aboard a chartered train on the Washington, Baltimore and Annapolis Electric Railway, officials of the Lancaster Railway and Locomotive Historical Society of Pennsylvania and the Interstate Trolley Club of Trenton, New Jersey, frame the basis of the National Railway Historical Society as a merger of the two constituent organizations.
- August 22 – Diesel locomotives begin to replace steam locomotives on Baltimore and Ohio Railroad's long-distance passenger trains.
- August 28 – The United States Congress passes the Public Utility Holding Company Act. Heralded as a consumer protection milestone, it also separates transit companies from the deep pockets of their parent electric utilities. This becomes one of the nails in the coffin of streetcar and interurban railroads in the United States.
- August 29 – Railroad Retirement Board established in United States to administer pension benefits for railroad employees.
- August 30 – The Santa Fe Railroad takes delivery of its first mainline diesel locomotives.

=== September events ===
- September – The 1935 Labor Day hurricane destroys much of the Florida East Coast Railway's Key West extension; an evacuation train from the island is on the bridges linking the keys with the Florida mainland at the time the storm hits and 259 lives are lost.
- September 27 – The London & North Eastern Railway's first A4 Class streamlined 4-6-2 steam locomotive A4 2509 Silver Link attains 112.5 mph (181 km/h) on a demonstration run out of London King's Cross.
- September 29 – The last train operates on the Lynton & Barnstaple Railway in England.
- September 30 – The London & North Eastern Railway begins to run the Silver Jubilee train between London King's Cross and Newcastle, Britain's first streamliner, using Nigel Gresley's A4 Class locomotives.

=== October ===
- October 6 – Market Street Railway Company (MSRy) starts operation on the first trackless trolley system in California, taking over from the 33 Ashbury streetcar.
- October 30 – The Midosuji Line in Osaka, Japan, is opened between Shinsaibashi and Namba.

=== December events ===
- December 30 – The Southern Pacific Coast Line is diverted around downtown San Jose, California, consolidating passenger operations at the new Cahill Depot.

=== Unknown date events ===
- The Milwaukee Road enters bankruptcy.
- The Goodyear-Zeppelin Company completes construction on the Comet streamlined passenger trainset for the New York, New Haven & Hartford Railroad.
- The National Model Railroad Association is founded in the United States.

== Births ==
=== February births ===
- February 21 – Jean Pelletier, Chairman of Via Rail 2001–2004.

== Deaths ==
=== September deaths ===
- September 20 – William W. Atterbury, president of the Pennsylvania Railroad 1925–1935 (born 1866).

=== December deaths ===
- December – Mantis James Van Sweringen, American financier who, with his brother Oris, controlled the Nickel Plate Road and other eastern United States railroads (born 1881).
