= Baldwin DT-6-6-2000 =

American diesel locomotive

BLW DT-6-6-2000 (606SC)
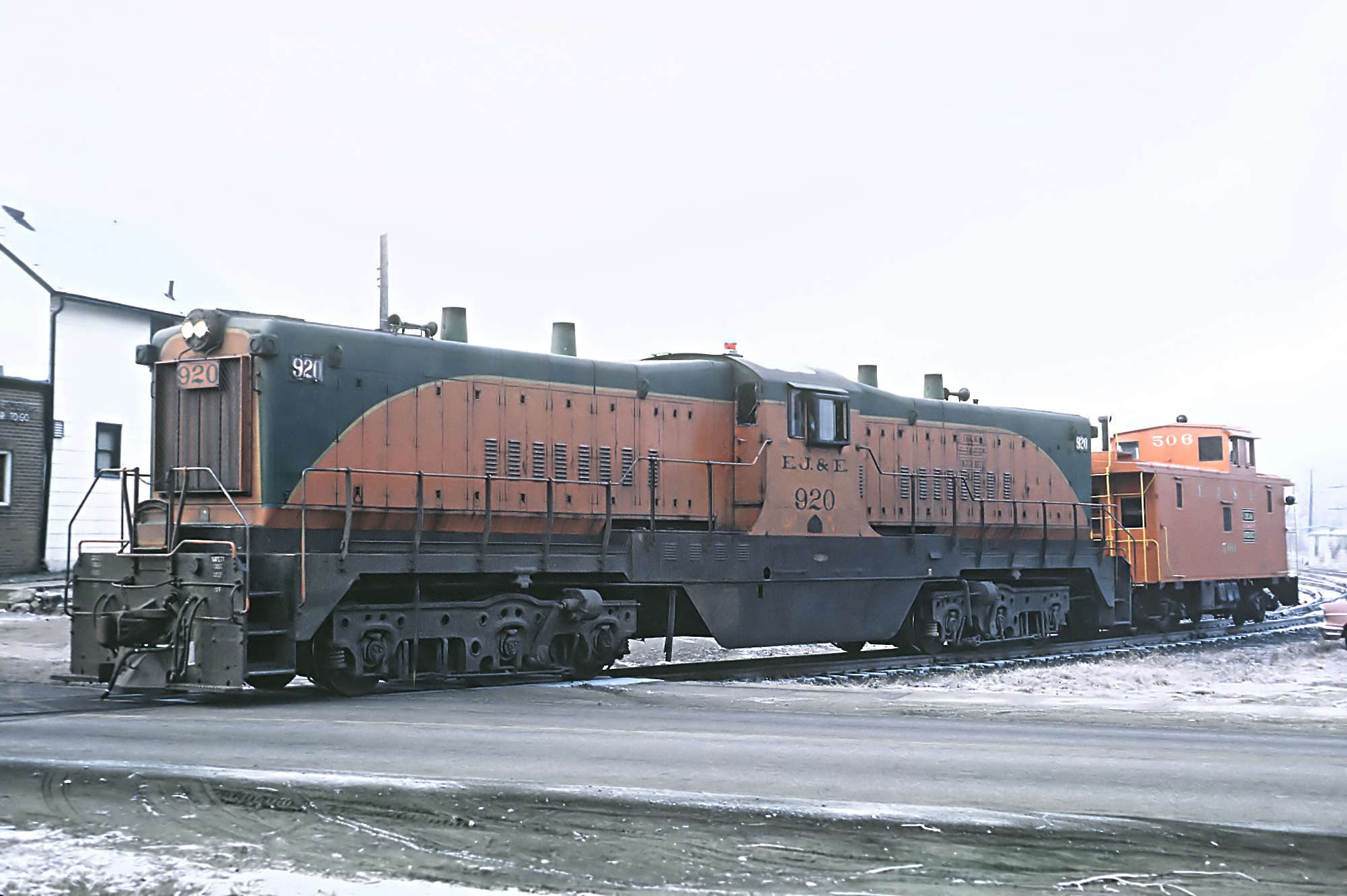
- Elgin, Joliet & Eastern Railway 920 (Baldwin DT-6-6-2000 rebuilt by EMD) at Griffith, Ind. in January 1965
Type and origin
- Power type: Diesel-electric
- Builder: Baldwin Locomotive Works (BLW)
- Model: DT-6-6-2000
- Build date: March 1948 — August 1950
- Total produced: 45
Specifications
- Configuration
  - AAR: C-C
  - UIC: Co′Co′
- Gauge: 4 ft 8 1/2 in (1,435 mm)
- Trucks: GSC 13 ft (3.96 m) rigid bolster
- Length: 74 ft (22.56 m)
- Loco weight: 354,000–375,000 lb (161,000–170,000 kg)
- Prime mover: 606SC × 2
- Engine type: Four-stroke diesel
- Aspiration: Turbocharger Elliott Company H503 (215 hp)
- Displacement: 11,874 cu in (194.58 L) per engine
- Generator: Westinghouse 430F
- Traction motors: Westinghouse 370G (6)
- Cylinders: 6 × 2
- Cylinder size: 12 3/4 in × 15 1/2 in (324 mm × 394 mm)
Performance figures
- Power output: 2,000 hp (1,491 kW)
- Tractive effort: 64,200 lbf (285.6 kN)
Career
- Nicknames: Center Cab, SW2400
- Locale: North America
- Preserved: MN&S #21
- Current owner: Illinois Railway Museum #21
- Disposition: 1 preserved, remainder scrapped

BLW DT-6-6-2000 (608NA)
Type and origin
- Power type: Diesel-electric
- Builder: Baldwin Locomotive Works (BLW)
- Model: DT-6-6-2000
- Build date: May 1946
- Total produced: 1
Specifications
- Configuration
  - AAR: C-C
  - UIC: Co′Co′
- Gauge: 4 ft 8 1/2 in (1,435 mm)
- Trucks: GSC 13 ft (3.96 m) rigid bolster
- Length: 70 ft 6 in (21.49 m)
- Loco weight: 365,000 lb (165.6 tonnes)
- Prime mover: 608NA × 2
- Engine type: Four-stroke diesel
- Aspiration: Normally aspirated
- Displacement: 15,832 cu in (259.44 L) per engine
- Cylinders: 8 × 2
- Cylinder size: 12 3/4 in × 15 1/2 in (324 mm × 394 mm)
Performance figures
- Power output: 2,000 hp (1,491 kW)
- Tractive effort: 64,200 lbf (285.6 kN)
Career
- Nicknames: Golden Goose
- Disposition: Scrapped

The Baldwin DT-6-6-2000 (Also referred to as the Baldwin DT6-6-2000) was a twin-engined diesel-electric transfer switcher, built by Baldwin Locomotive Works between 1946 and 1950.

A single prototype using a pair of 8 cylinder naturally aspirated 608NA prime movers (engines) was built in 1946 for the Elgin, Joliet and Eastern Railway. In order to minimise the length of the locomotive, the crosswalks at the ends of the locomotives were omitted. This feature was not repeated in the subsequent locomotives. A further 45 locomotives were built using 6-cylinder turbocharged 606SC prime movers during 1948–1950.

The DT-6-6-2000 was most popular with the Elgin, Joliet and Eastern Railway, who purchased 27 of the 46 locomotives produced. Between 1956 and 1962, all but two of these locomotives (#100 and #118) underwent a significant rebuilding program. Several locomotives were rebuilt by the EJ&E at their Joliet shops and equipped with 1,200 hp (890 kW) Baldwin 606A engines. The rest were sent to the EMD facility in La Grange, Illinois, where they were rebuilt and equipped with modified SW series hoods, 1,200 hp EMD 567C engines, and new control stands, as well as multiple-unit train control capability. The EJ&E rebuilt units were retired in the late 1960s, and the EMD rebuilt units were retired between 1974 and 1975. All were subsequently scrapped.

Minneapolis, Northfield and Southern Railway #21 is the only DT-6-6-2000 preserved. It is owned by the Illinois Railway Museum in Union, Illinois where it remains in operable condition.

== Original buyers ==
Image	Railroad	Quantity	Road numbers	Notes
	Baldwin Locomotive Works (demonstrators)	2	2000	to Atchison, Topeka & Santa Fe 2606
	Baldwin Locomotive Works (demonstrators)	2	2001	to Elgin Joliet & Eastern 126
	Atchison, Topeka and Santa Fe Railway	6	2600–2605	
	Elgin, Joliet and Eastern Railway	1	100	prototype with 608NA engines
	Elgin, Joliet and Eastern Railway	25	101-125	
	St. Louis Southwestern Railway (“Cotton Belt”)	1	260	
	Duluth, South Shore and Atlantic Railway	4	300-303	to Soo Line Railroad 395–398 in 1961
	Minneapolis, Northfield and Southern Railway	5	20-24	
	Trona Railway	2	50-51	
	Total	46		

== Gallery ==
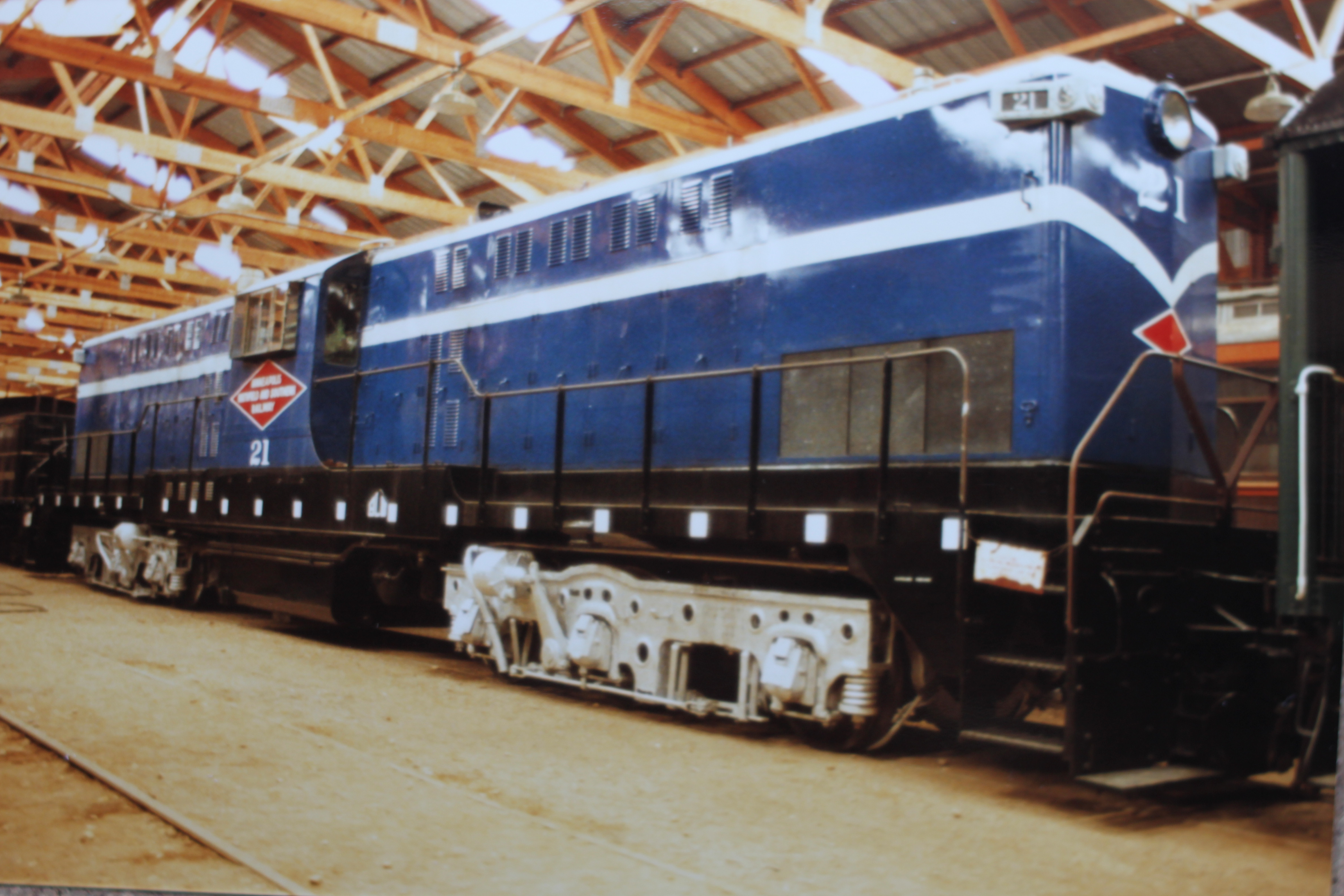

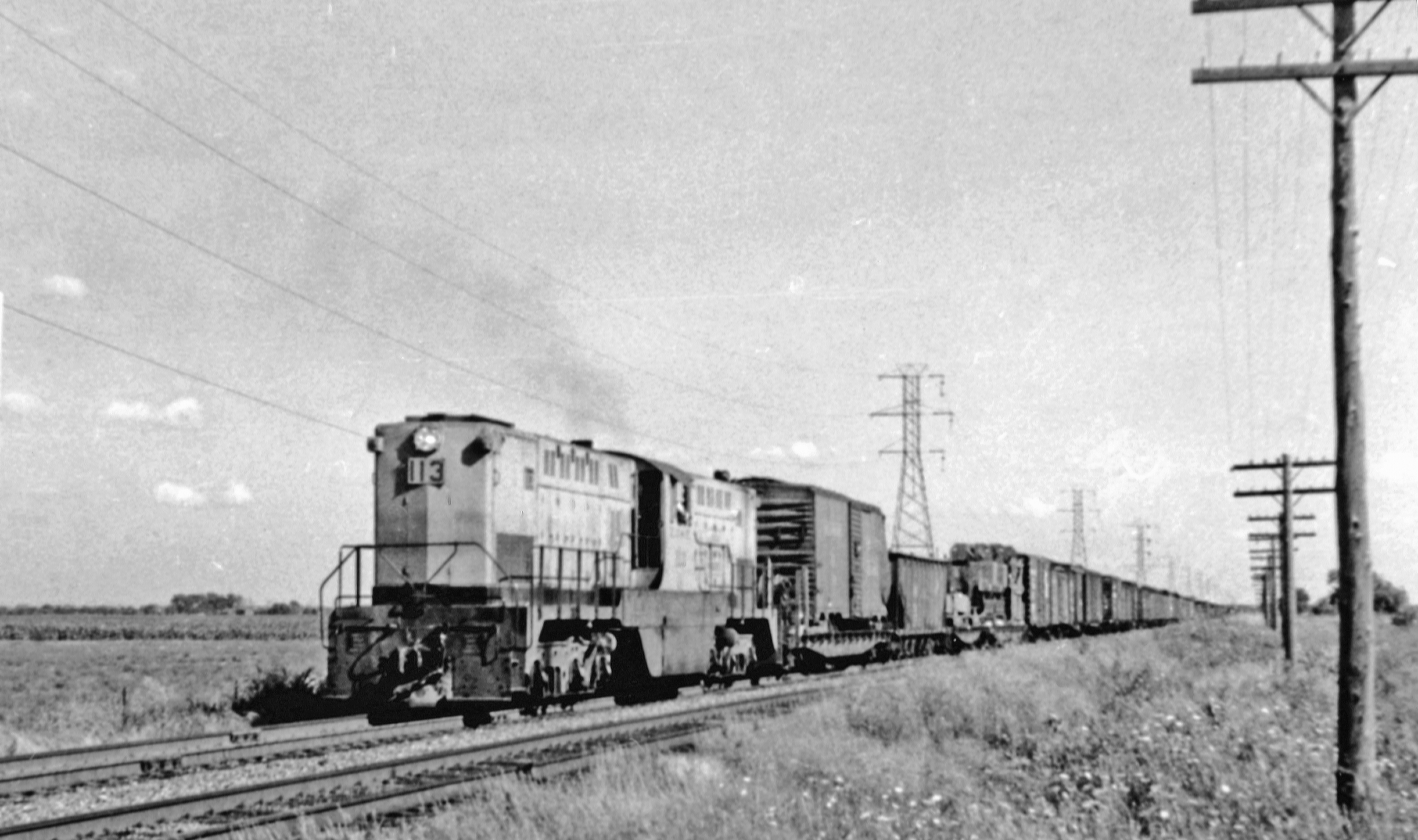

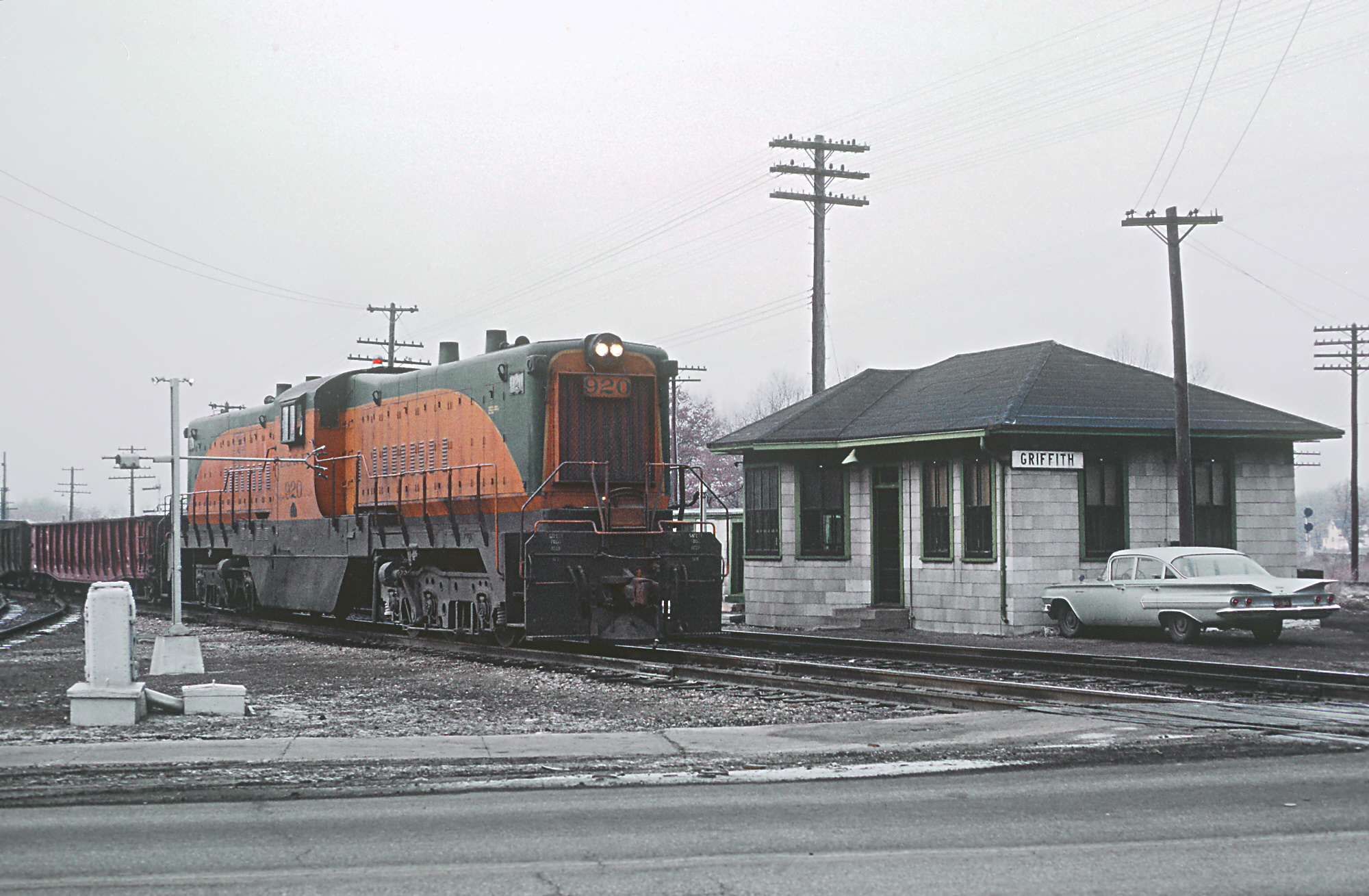

== See also ==
- Lima-Hamilton 2500HP Transfer Locomotive and Baldwin RT-624, similar center-cab style transfer units.
