= Pennsylvania Railroad de Glehn locomotive =

Pennsylvania Railroad 2512
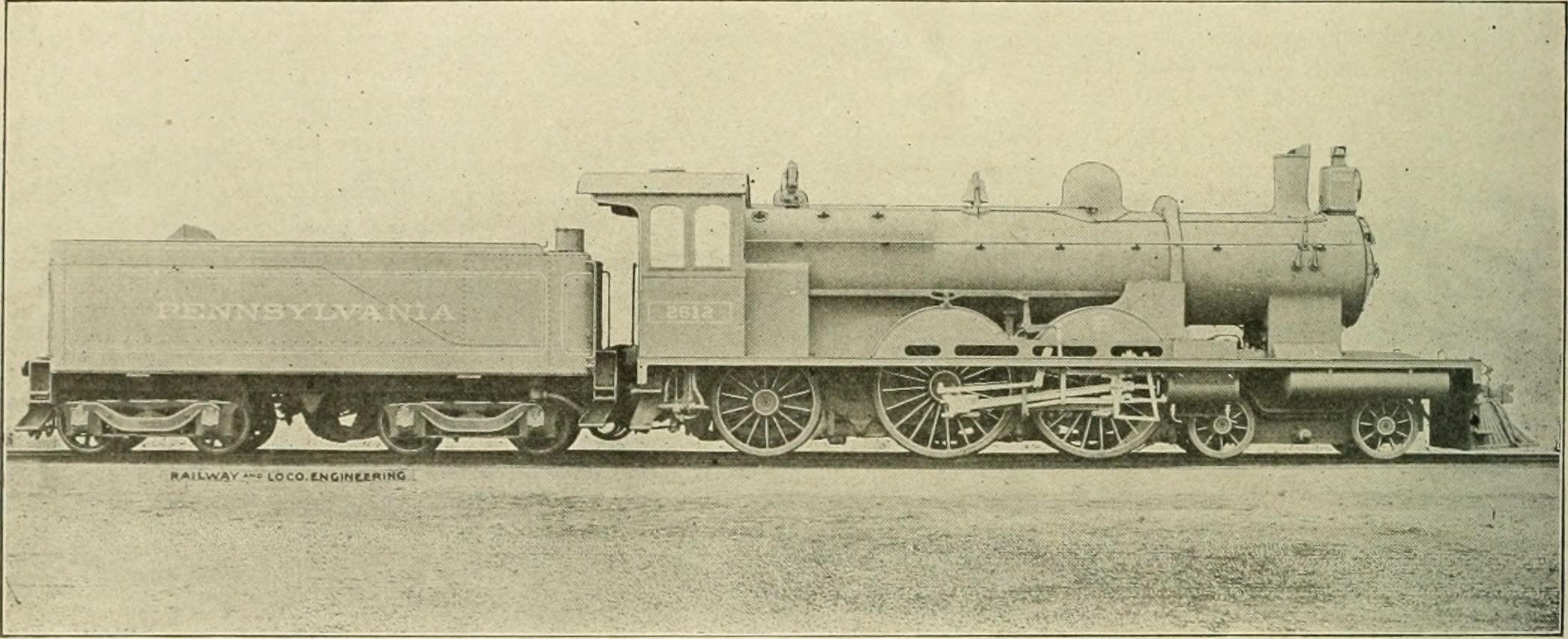
Type and origin
- Power type: Steam
- Builder: Société Alsacienne de Constructions Mécaniques
- Serial number: 5438
- Build date: 1904
- Total produced: 1
Specifications
- Configuration
  - Whyte: 4-4-2
- Gauge: 4 ft 8 1/2 in (1,435 mm)
- Fuel type: Coal
- Cylinders: 4
Performance figures
- Tractive effort: 18,072 lbf (80.39 kN)
Career
- Numbers: 2512
- Nicknames: "de Glehn", "the French aristocrat"
- Retired: 1912
- Disposition: Scrapped

The Pennsylvania Railroad's no. 2512 was a single de Glehn Compound 4-4-2 "Atlantic" type locomotive the railroad imported from France in 1904.

== Background ==
After seeing the success of compound locomotives designed by Alfred de Glehn in use on various French railways, the Pennsylvania Railroad believed that such a design could inspire their engineers and so decided to purchase one of de Glehn's designs. While the engine would be grouped with the class E locomotives as it was a 4-4-2 arrangement, it did not receive a formal classification, as it was a single experimental design.

The engine was displayed as one of the PRR System exhibits at the Louisiana Purchase Exposition in 1904. It was also tested on one of the other exhibits, the Locomotive Testing Plant, which was installed at St. Louis to show its contribution to the advancement of the science of locomotive engineering. The de Glehn was tested with seven other types of locomotive chosen to cover a variety in the essential principles of design. The performance of the de Glehn, as measured on the Test Plant, was used for comparison with later PRR locomotive classes such as the K29 and K2SA.

The de Glehn was found to be too light for use by the PRR and saw little service beyond their shops. The engine was retired by 1912, and scrapped.
