= 6L =

6L or 6-L can refer to:

- 6L, or British Rail Class 202
- IATA code for Aklak Air
- Typ 6L, a model of SEAT Ibiza
- Typ 6L, a model of SEAT Córdoba
- Model R-6L, a model of Curtiss Model R
- TAF6L
- 6L, a model of HP LaserJet 6
- 6L, the production code for the 1984 Doctor Who serial Warriors of the Deep

== See also ==
- L6 (disambiguation)
