= Pennsylvania Railroad class CC2s =

PRR Class CC2s
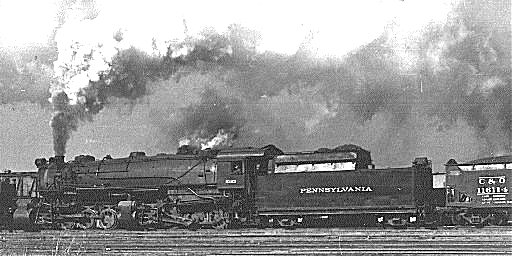
Type and origin
- Power type: Steam
- Builder: Baldwin
- Serial number: 51716, 51867, 51904, 51938, 51973, 51994, 52054, 52227, 52291 and 52372
- Build date: April–September 1919
Specifications
- Configuration
  - Whyte: 0-8-8-0
- Gauge: 4 ft 8 1/2 in (1,435 mm)
- Heating surface
  - Firebox: 76 sq ft (7.1 m^{2})
  - Tubes and flues: 42 sq ft (3.9 m^{2})
Career
- Operators: Pennsylvania Railroad
- Class: CC2s
- Number in class: 10
- Numbers: 7250, 7332, 7335, 7649, 7693, 9357-9359, 8158 and 8183
- Locale: Northeastern United States
- Scrapped: October 1947–April 1949
- Disposition: All scrapped

The Pennsylvania Railroad (PRR) class CC2s consisted of ten 0-8-8-0 compound articulated (Mallet) type of steam locomotive built by Baldwin Locomotive Works in 1919 for PRR. These were used for transfer runs, and used for switching as "yard hump" power.

By 1957, all steam locomotives of the PRR were retired when the PRR switched from steam to diesel. These large engines continued to pull heavy transfer runs throughout the 1940s. The PRR sold all of them for scrap between October 1947 and April 1949, none being preserved.
