= Pennsylvania Railroad class E1 =

External images
- PRR 700 builder's photo
- PRR 820 builder's photo

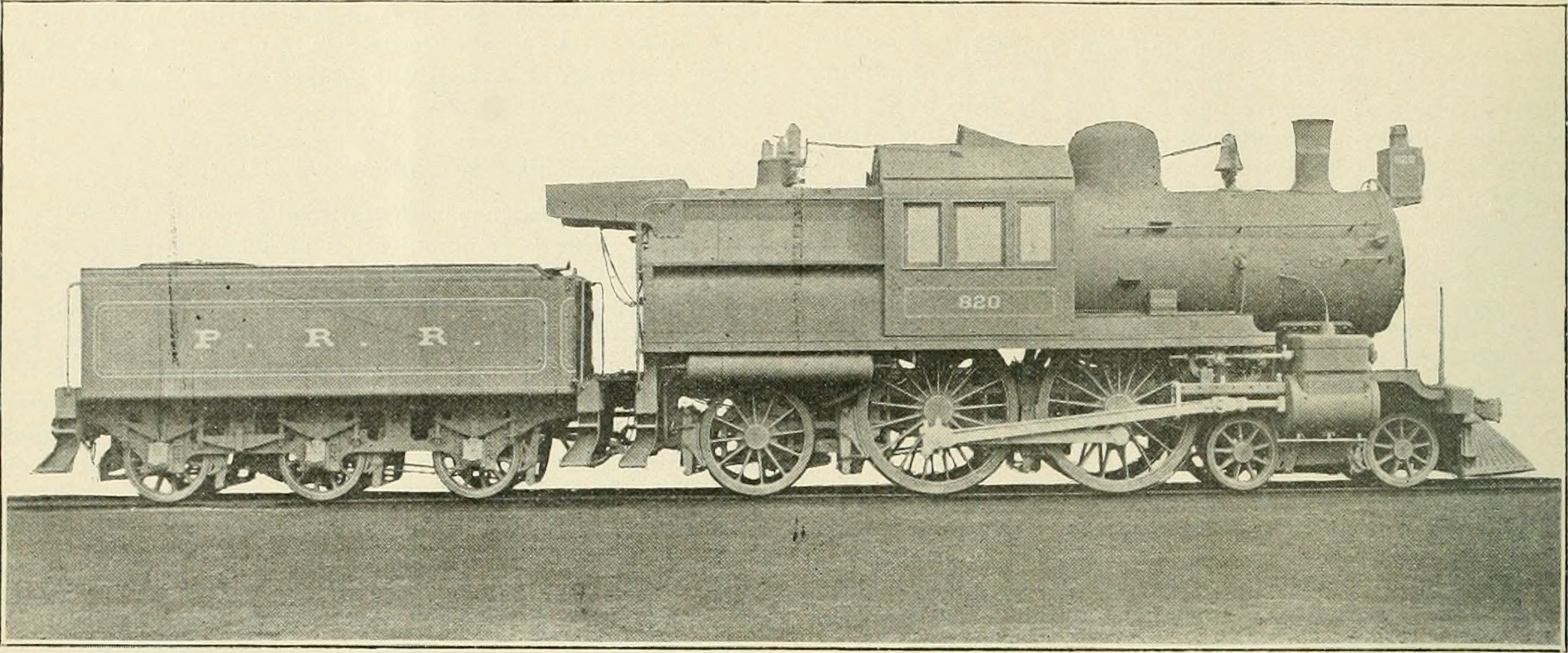

Pennsylvania Railroad's E1 class comprised three experimental 4-4-2 "Atlantic" locomotives built in 1899 to compete with the Reading Railroad on the Philadelphia, Pennsylvania (Camden, New Jersey), to Atlantic City, New Jersey, high-speed seashore passenger train service. These engines were designed as cab-center or camelback locomotives with wide fireboxes and 80 in (2,032 mm) drivers that carried 50,000 lb (22,680 kg) per axle. They proved capable in fast service but the inherent danger of separating the engineer from the fireman was unacceptable to the PRR so they were sold to their subsidiary the Long Island Rail Road in 1903. While the camelback design was unfavorable the Atlantic style proved to be everything the Pennsylvania Railroad needed at that time. They went on to acquire 596 additional units over the next fifteen years.

== Class E1a ==
E2 engine #269, the first of the class, was built in July 1900 and was reclassified to E1a in 1902.

== See also ==
- PRR locomotive classification
