= Pennsylvania Railroad class HH1s =

Railroad locomotive

HH1s class
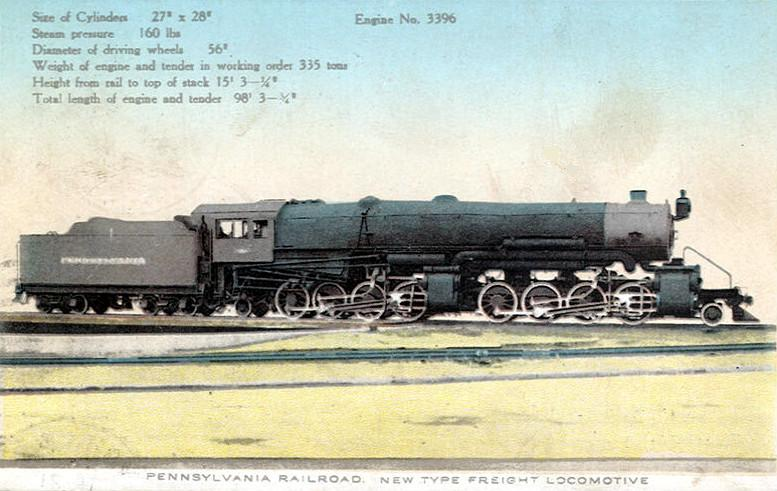
- Postcard depiction of Pennsylvania Railroad #3396.
Type and origin
- Power type: Steam
- Designer: Francis Cole
- Builder: ALCO
- Build date: 1911
Specifications
- Configuration
  - Whyte: 2-8-8-2
- Gauge: 4 ft 8 1/2 in (1,435 mm)
- Fuel type: Coal
- Firebox
  - Type: wagon-top
- Feedwater heater: Elesco or Worthington (disputed)
- Cylinders: Four
- Valve gear: Walschaerts
- Valve type: Piston
- Loco brake: Air
Career
- Operators: Pennsylvania Railroad
- Class: HH1s
- Numbers: 3396
- Retired: 1928
- Disposition: Scrapped

The Pennsylvania Railroad's class HH1s comprised a single 2-8-8-2 type steam locomotive. Unlike most Pennsylvania Railroad steam locomotives, it had a wagon-top boiler. It was built by the American Locomotive Company (ALCO) in 1911. For 17 years, the single HH1s served as a helper until 1928. It had the road number 3396 and was subsequently scrapped after it was taken out of service in 1928.
