= Pennsylvania Railroad class AA1 =

PRR AA1
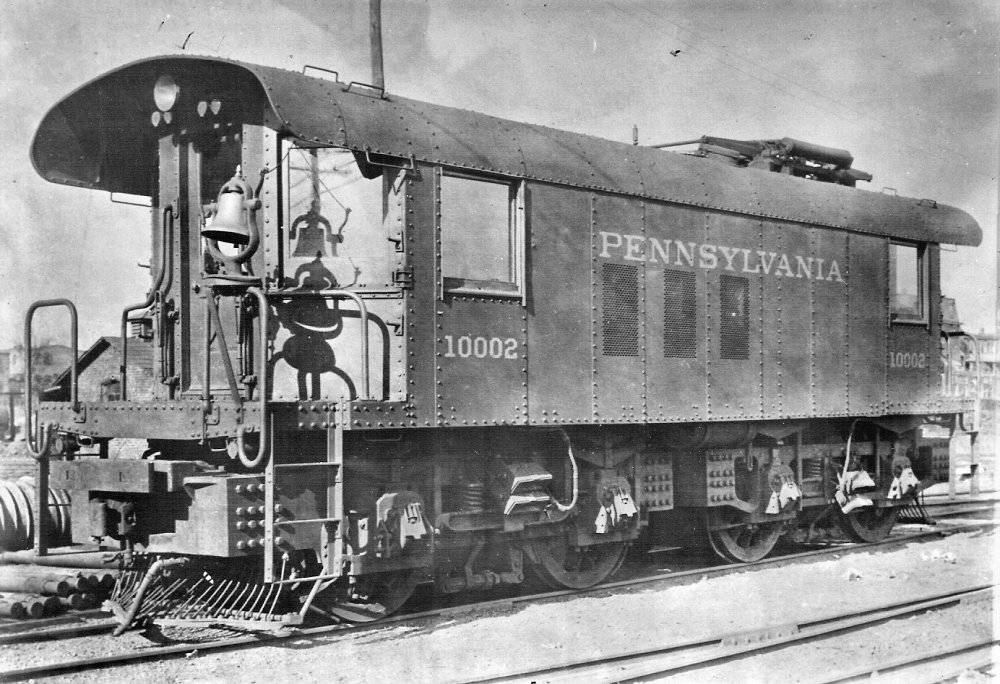
- PRR AA1 No. 10002
Type and origin
- Power type: Electric
- Builder: Altoona Works and Westinghouse
- Serial number: EZN-7, EZN-8
- Build date: 1905
- Total produced: 2
Specifications
- Configuration
  - AAR: B-B
- Gauge: 4 ft 8 1/2 in (1,435 mm) standard gauge
- Wheel diameter: 56 in (1,422 mm)
- Wheelbase: Truck: 8.5 ft (2.59 m); Overall: 26 ft (7.92 m)
- Loco weight: 10001: 87 short tons (79 t; 78 long tons); 10002: 97 short tons (88 t; 87 long tons)
- Electric system/s: 600 V DC third rail
- Current pickup: Contact shoe

The Pennsylvania Railroad's class AA1 comprised two experimental electric locomotives constructed in 1905 by the company's own Altoona Works with the assistance of Westinghouse. Intended as testbeds as the PRR began its electrification project, both locomotives remained service into the 1930s.

== History ==
In the early 1900s, the Pennsylvania Railroad embarked on a major program to improve its access to New York City. The New York Tunnel Extension comprised tunnels and approaches from New Jersey and Long Island to Midtown Manhattan, leading to the PRR's massive new station, New York Penn Station. It was obvious that steam locomotives would be inappropriate for prolonged operation underground, so the PRR began experimenting with 600 V DC electrification, which had already been placed into operation elsewhere by the Baltimore and Ohio Railroad and the New York, New Haven and Hartford Railroad.

The Pennsylvania Railroad constructed the two locomotives in its Altoona Works as testbeds for larger locomotives to come. Both were of B-B wheel arrangement in the Association of American Railroads classification scheme; each had two trucks, each with two axles and four wheels.

The first, No. 10001, used direct geared traction motors. The second, No. 10002, was built with motors mounted in the truck frames and geared to the wheels. Later on it was given one gearless truck.

Both locomotives proved unstable at speed, pounding the track with high lateral forces. A competing experimental unit, "Odd D" #10003, of 4-4-0 wheel arrangement in Whyte notation or 2-B in the AAR scheme, proved much more stable. It was selected as the basis for the production model, which became the PRR DD1 twin-unit locomotive.

At low speeds in switching service, however, the locomotives were acceptable. The first, #10001, was renumbered #3950 and was sold to the (PRR subsidiary) Long Island Rail Road in 1916. Numbered 323 on that road and nicknamed "Phoebe", the locomotive was in use until 1937 when it was scrapped. No. 10002, meanwhile, was renumbered #3951 and continued in service on the PRR.
