= L 6 (keelboat) =

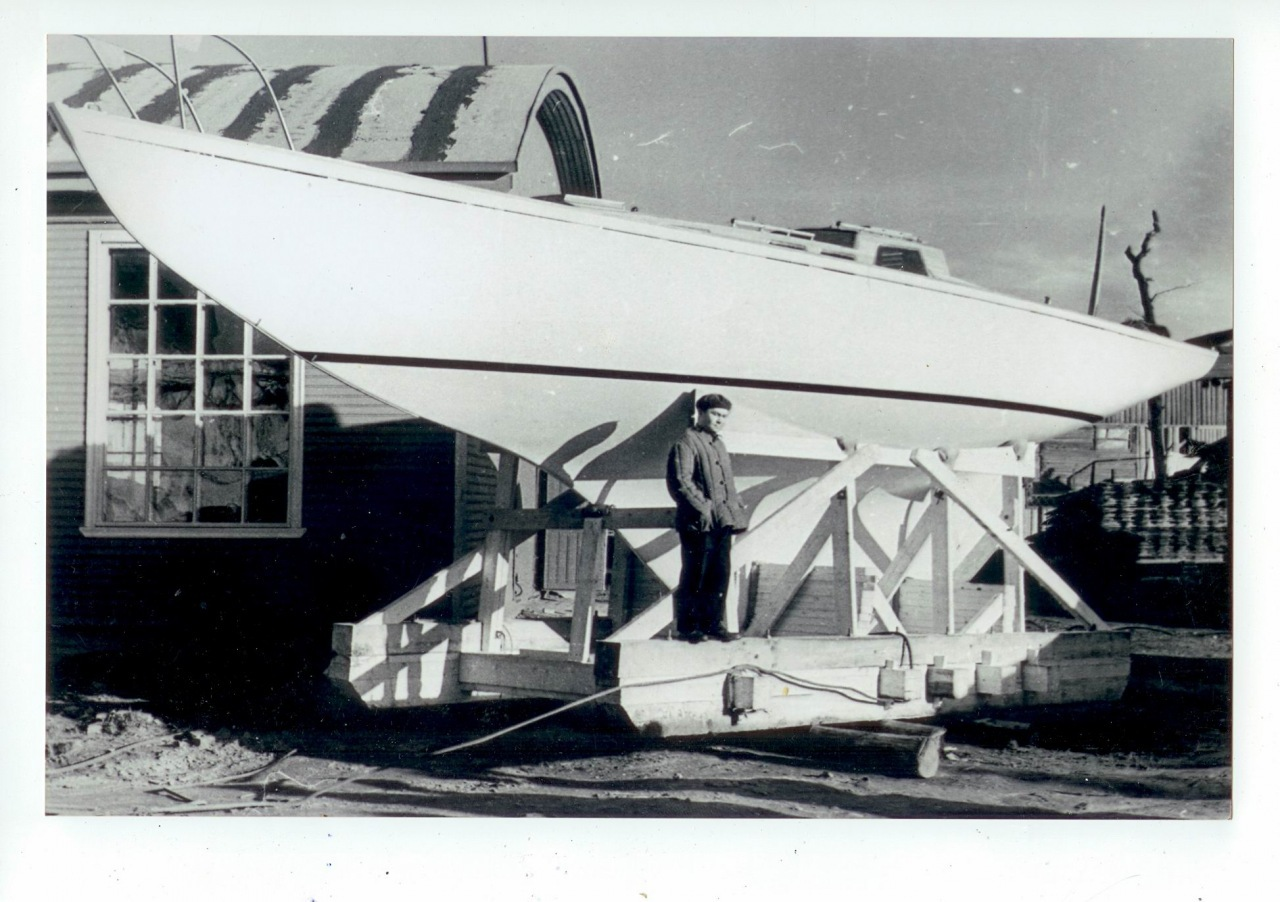
- Angara, the first L 6-class yacht.

Development
- Designer: A. Kiselev
- Year: 1958

Hull
- LOA: 12.6 m (41 ft)

L 6 (Russian: Л-6) is a 12.6-metre (41 ft) sailboat class designed by A. Kiselev and built in about 110 copies, sailed in the Baltic and Black Sea.
