= Comet (train) =

Diesel electric streamliner

New Haven Comet
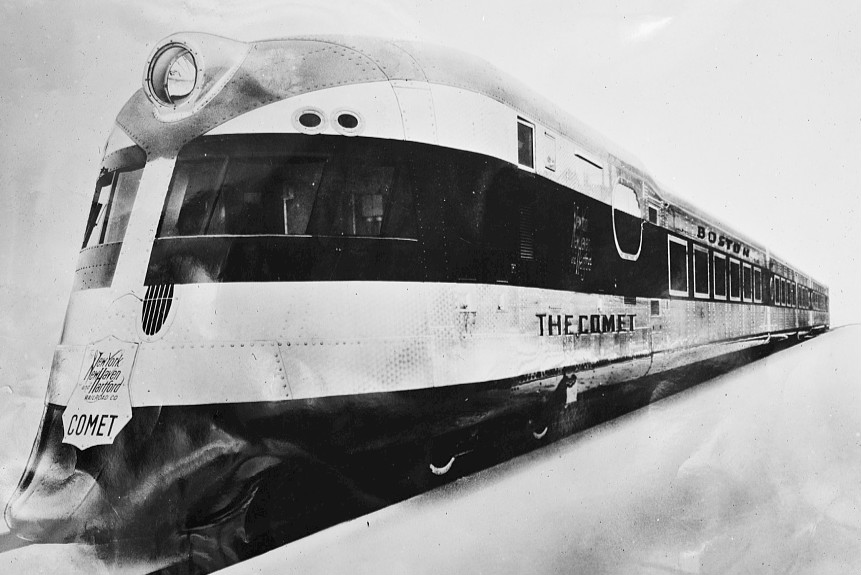
- The Comet in 1935.
- Manufacturer: Goodyear Zeppelin Corporation
- Constructed: 1935
- Scrapped: 1951
- Number built: One 3-car set
- Number preserved: None
- Capacity: 160 passengers
- Operator: New York, New Haven and Hartford Railroad

Specifications
- Car body construction: Aluminum alloy
- Train length: 207 ft 0 in (63.094 m)
- Car length: Power cars: 74 ft 2 in (22.606 m); Trailer car: 58 ft 8 in (17.882 m)
- Width: 9 ft 10 in (3.00 m)
- Height: 11 ft 3 in (3.43 m)
- Floor height: 2 ft 8 1/4 in (0.819 m) above railhead
- Doors: 'Plug' type, three each side
- Articulated sections: Three
- Wheel diameter: Powered: 36 in (914 mm); Unpowered: 30 in (762 mm)
- Maximum speed: 95 miles per hour (153 km/h)
- Weight: 126 short tons (114 tonnes)
- Traction system: Diesel-electric
- Prime mover: Two 400 hp (298 kW) Westinghouse/Beardmore Inline-6 model 160 diesel engines (one each end)
- Power output: 800 hp (597 kW)
- UIC classification: B′2′2′B′
- Track gauge: 4 ft 8 1/2 in (1,435 mm)

The Comet was a diesel-electric streamliner built in 1935 for the New York, New Haven and Hartford Railroad by the Goodyear-Zeppelin Company. Smaller than the other streamliners, it was a three-car, double-ended train that could operate in both directions and thus did not need to be turned at destinations—ideal for the New Haven's cramped terminus at South Station in Boston.

It was initially placed into service between Boston, Massachusetts and Providence, Rhode Island on a 44-minute schedule; later, intermediate stops were added at Back Bay in Boston and Pawtucket/Central Falls, Rhode Island, on an advertised "44 miles in 44 minutes" schedule. It ran 5 daily round trips on weekdays, and was often used for weekend excursion trips. This service lasted until the beginning of World War II, when increased traffic volume overwhelmed the capacity of the Comet, after which it was placed on local commuter services around the Boston area. The trainset was withdrawn from service in 1951 and scrapped.

The interior was furnished with 48 seat in each power car, and 64 in the center car divided into two sections: a smoking section seating 28 and a non-smoking seating 36. Seating was of the 'walk-over' type, and all seats were coach-class; there being no provision for first- or parlor-class seating.

The exterior was machined aluminum in a whorled pattern with color bands of bright blue enamel at window height, dark blue enamel at wheel level, and a gray enamel roof. The whole exterior was covered with a coat of clear varnish to prevent tarnishing. The front ends were sharply raked, with a pointed "chin" pilot.
