= Pennsylvania Railroad class D5 =

Pennsylvania Railroad D5
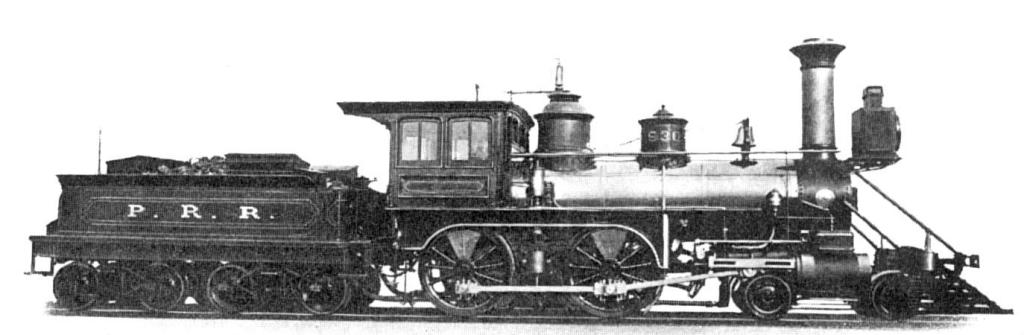
- Builder's photo of D5 #930
Type and origin
- Power type: Steam
- Builder: PRR Altoona shops
- Build date: 1870–1873
- Total produced: 18
Specifications
- Configuration
  - Whyte: 4-4-0
  - UIC: 2′B
- Gauge: 4 ft 8 1/2 in (1,435 mm)
- Leading dia.: 26 in (660 mm)
- Driver dia.: 56 in (1,422 mm)
- Wheelbase: 19 ft 9.6 in (6.04 m) (locomotive); 40 ft 6.1 in (12.35 m) (with tender)
- Length: 49 ft 6.2 in (15.09 m) (locomotive and tender)
- Width: 8 ft 10 1/2 in (2.71 m) (cab roof)
- Height: 14 ft 8 in (4.47 m) (rail to top of stack)
- Adhesive weight: 40,800 lb (18.5 tonnes)
- Loco weight: 65,200 lb (29.6 tonnes)
- Tender weight: 40,800 lb (18.5 tonnes)
- Total weight: 106,000 lb (48.1 tonnes)
- Fuel capacity: 6,500 lb (2.9 tonnes)
- Water cap.: 1,600 US gal (6,100 L; 1,300 imp gal)

The Pennsylvania Railroad's steam locomotive class D5 (formerly Class G, pre-1895) comprised eighteen lightweight 4-4-0 locomotives for light duty, maintenance-of-way and branch-line service, constructed at the railroad's own Altoona Works (now owned by Norfolk Southern) during 1870–1873.

They shared many parts with other standard classes, although less so with the heavy 4-4-0s on account of their lighter build; instead, they shared some components with 0-6-0 switcher classes F and H (later B1 and B2). The Class G locomotives had a straight-topped boiler, unlike the wagon-top of the other 4-4-0 classes.
