= Pennsylvania Railroad class CC1s =

Pennsylvania Railroad CC1s
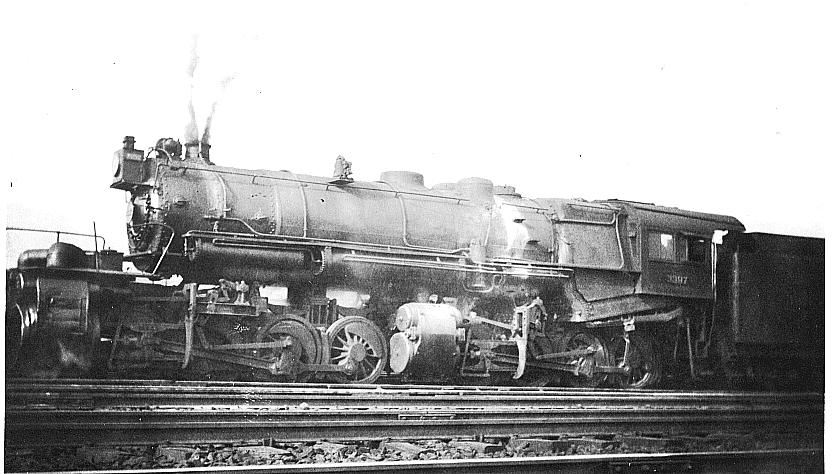
Type and origin
- Power type: Steam
- Builder: Baldwin Locomotive Works (1)
- Model: Baldwin 16-44/72 EE
- Build date: 1912
- Total produced: 1
Specifications
- Configuration
  - Whyte: 0-8-8-0 (Mallet)
- Gauge: 4 ft 8 1/2 in (1,435 mm)
- Driver dia.: 56 in (1,400 mm)
- Adhesive weight: 370,000 lb (167,800 kg)
- Fuel type: Coal
- Firebox
  - Grate area: 78 sq ft (7.2 m^{2})
- Boiler pressure: 205 psi (1.41 MPa)
- Heating surface: 4,953 sq ft (460.1 m^{2})
- Superheater
  - Heating area: 988 sq ft (91.8 m^{2})
- Cylinders: Four: Mallet compound
- High-pressure cylinder: 25 in × 30 in (635 mm × 762 mm)
- Low-pressure cylinder: 39 in × 30 in (991 mm × 762 mm)
Career
- Operators: Pennsylvania Railroad
- Numbers: 3397
- Disposition: Scrapped in 1932

The Pennsylvania Railroad (PRR) class CC1s consisted of a single experimental 0-8-8-0 steam locomotive built by Baldwin Locomotive Works in 1912. It was assigned road number #3397 and placed in service at the PRR Pitcairn yard in Pitcairn, Pennsylvania, near Pittsburgh. A subsequent class, the CC2s, was constructed after the tests conducted with this locomotive. Finding little advantage to articulated steam locomotives, the PRR scrapped it in 1932.

== Bibliography ==
- Churella, Albert J. (26 November 2024). The Pennsylvania Railroad: The Long Decline, 1933–1968. Indiana University Press. ISBN 9780253069498 – via Google Books.
