= Baldwin RT-624 =

1951–1954 twin-engined diesel-electric locomotive

RT-624
Type and origin
- Power type: Diesel-electric
- Builder: Baldwin-Lima-Hamilton Corporation
- Model: RT-624
- Build date: August 1951 to February 1954
- Total produced: 24
Specifications
- Configuration
  - AAR: C-C
  - UIC: Co′Co′
- Gauge: 4 ft 8 1/2 in (1,435 mm)
- Trucks: GSC 13-ft rigid bolster
- Length: 74 ft (22.56 m)
- Loco weight: 354,000–375,000 lb (161,000–170,000 kg)
- Power supply: 75 V
- Prime mover: 606A × 2
- RPM
  - Maximum RPM: 625
- Engine type: Four-stroke diesel
- Aspiration: Turbocharger Elliott Company H503 (215 hp)
- Generator: Westinghouse YG42B
- Traction motors: Westinghouse 370DEZ (6)
- Cylinders: 6 × 2
Performance figures
- Power output: 2,400 hp (1,800 kW)
- Tractive effort
  - Starting: 106,200 lbf (472.40 kN)
  - Continuous: 72,900 lbf (324.28 kN)
Career
- Operators: Pennsylvania Railroad, Minneapolis, Northfield and Southern, Penn Central
- Class: PRR- BS24m
- Nicknames: Center Cab
- Disposition: All scrapped

The BLH RT-624 was a twin-engined diesel-electric locomotive, built by Baldwin-Lima-Hamilton Corporation between August 1951 and February 1954.

The RT-624, an improved version of the former Baldwin DT-6-6-2000, was a center-cab transfer locomotive. Twenty-four locomotives were built using 6-cylinder turbocharged 606A prime movers during 1951–1954. Penn Central operated ex-PRR #8955, and was retired in October 1969, and scrapped in July 1970. No examples were preserved.

== Original buyers ==
Railroad	Quantity	Road numbers	Notes
Pennsylvania Railroad	23	8113, 8724–8731, 8952–8965	
Minneapolis, Northfield and Southern Railway	1	25	
Total	24		

== See also ==
- Lima-Hamilton 2500HP Transfer Locomotive, a similar center-cab style transfer unit.
