= Pennsylvania Railroad class L6 =

Pennsylvania Railroad L6
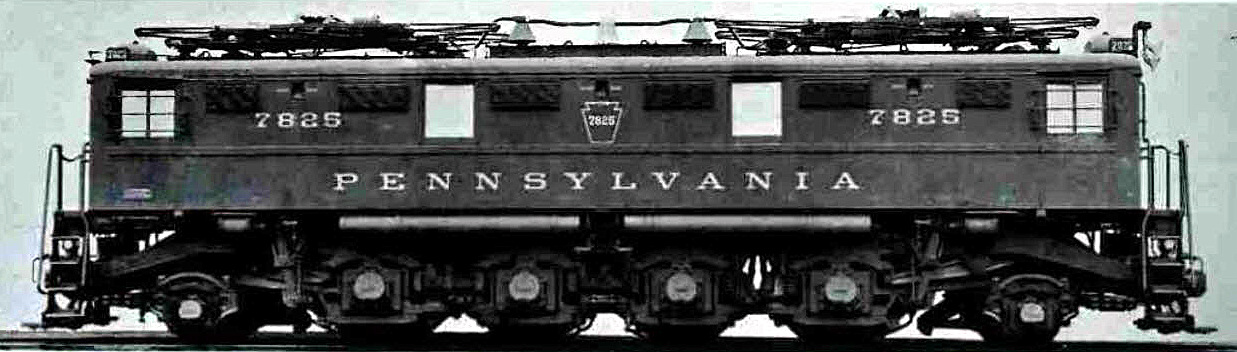
- L6 #7825
Type and origin
- Power type: Electric
- Builder: PRR Altoona Works
- Build date: 1932–1933
- Total produced: 3
Specifications
- Configuration
  - Whyte: 2-8-2
  - AAR: 1-D-1
  - UIC: 1'Do'1
- Gauge: 4 ft 8 1/2 in (1,435 mm) standard gauge
- Driver dia.: 62 in (1.575 m)
- Adhesive weight: 220,000 lb (99,800 kg)
- Loco weight: 300,000 lb (136,000 kg)
- Electric system/s: 11 kV, 25 Hz AC
- Current pickup(s): Pantograph
- Traction motors: 4x 625 hp (466 kW)
- Transmission: AC current fed via a transformer tap changer to AC traction motors.
- Train heating: None
- Loco brake: Air
- Train brakes: Air
- Safety systems: Cab signalling
Performance figures
- Maximum speed: 54 mph (87 km/h)
- Power output: 2,500 hp (1,900 kW)
- Tractive effort: 55,000 lbf (244.65 kN)
Career
- Operators: Pennsylvania Railroad
- Number in class: L6: 2, L6a: 1
- Scrapped: 1966–1967
- Disposition: All scrapped

The Pennsylvania Railroad's class L6 comprised three electric locomotives of 2-8-2 wheel arrangement in the Whyte notation. The intention was to build a whole class of freight boxcab locomotives using this design, but the displacement of class P5a to freight work after the introduction of the GG1 meant that there was little need for more electric freight locomotives.

Two L6 class locomotives were built at Altoona Works as prototypes in 1932. Numbered 7825–7826, they were renumbered 5938–5939 in 1933. Sixty production L6a locomotives were planned, with the car bodies of thirty subcontracted to Lima Locomotive Works (order number 1128, construction numbers 7587–7616). One was completed as PRR 5940, while the other 29 car bodies remained in store at Altoona until scrapped in 1942 for the war effort.

The 5939 and 5940 were renumbered 4790 and 4791 in 1966, with the 5938 scrapped the same year. The last two were scrapped in 1967.
