= Pennsylvania Railroad class J28 =

Class of American 2-6-2 locomotives

PRR Class J28
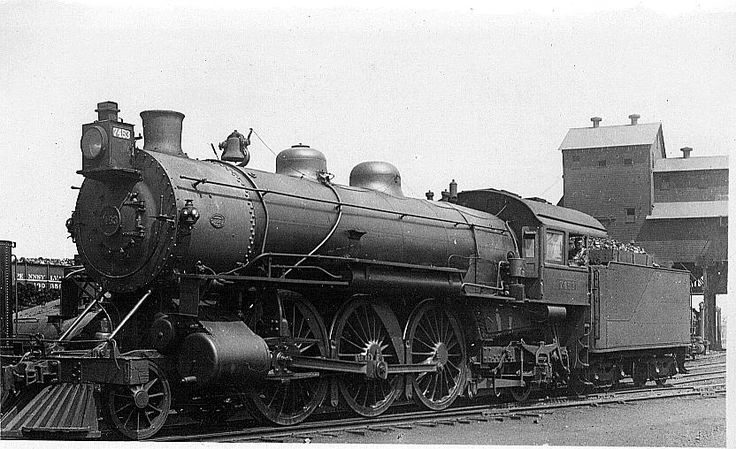
- PRR J28 #7453
Type and origin
- Power type: Steam
- Builder: Alco-Schenectady
- Build date: 1905
- Total produced: 2
Specifications
- Configuration
  - Whyte: 2-6-2
- Gauge: 4 ft 8 1/2 in (1,435 mm)
- Driver dia.: 80 in (2,000 mm)
- Wheelbase
  - Engine: 34 ft 3 in (10,440 mm)
- Total weight: 377,500 lb (171,200 kg)
- Fuel type: coal
- Fuel capacity: 13.5 short tons (12.2 t; 12.1 long tons)
- Water cap.: 7,000 US gal (26,000 L; 5,800 imp gal)
- Firebox
  - Grate area: 54 sq ft (5.0 m^{2})
- Heating surface
  - Firebox: 89 sq ft (8.3 m^{2})
- Valve gear: #7453: Stephenson #2761: Walschaerts
Performance figures
- Maximum speed: 45–65 mph (72–105 km/h)
- Tractive effort: 27,504 lbf (122.34 kN)
Career
- Operators: Pennsylvania Railroad
- Class: J28
- Number in class: 2
- Numbers: 7453, 2761
- Locale: Northeastern United States
- Retired: 1921 (1) 1924 (1)
- Disposition: Scrapped

The Pennsylvania Railroad's class J28 comprised two experimental 2-6-2 "Prairie" type steam locomotives.

== History ==
In 1905, the Pennsylvania Railroad needed a better steam locomotive than the class E 4-4-2 "Atlantic" type, which were increasingly becoming obsolescent in the face of heavier traffic and locomotive design development. Therefore, the railroad ordered six experimental locomotives, with two 2-6-2s from Alco-Schenectady being among the lot. With one each being allocated to the Fort Wayne and Pittsburgh divisions, they were tested extensively and failed in railroad service. However, they were still on the roster by 1924.

== Specifications ==
The two J28s had 80 in (2.0 m) drivers and a 34.25 ft (10.44 m) engine wheelbase. Engine #7453 had inboard piston valves and Stephenson valve gear, while #2761 had outside piston valves and Walschaerts valve gear. They each weighed 377,500 lb (171,200 kg) with the tender, able to hold 7,000 US gal (26,000 L; 5,800 imp gal) of water and 13.5 short tons (12.2 t; 12.1 long tons) of coal. They had 27,504 lbf (122.34 kN) of tractive effort, had a 89 square feet (8.3 m^{2}) of firebox space and a grate area of 54 square feet (5.0 m^{2}). Despite these specifications and more, the J28 proved insufficient for the Pennsylvania Railroad.

== Bibliography ==
- Staufer, Alvin F. (1962). Pennsy Power: Steam and Electric Locomotives of the Pennsylvania Railroad, 1900-1957 – via Internet Archive.
- Churella, Albert J. (26 November 2024). The Pennsylvania Railroad: The Long Decline, 1933–1968. Indiana University Press. ISBN 9780253069498 – via Google Books.
