= Pennsylvania Railroad Odd D 10003 =

Class of 1 American 2′B electric locomotive

PRR Odd D 10003
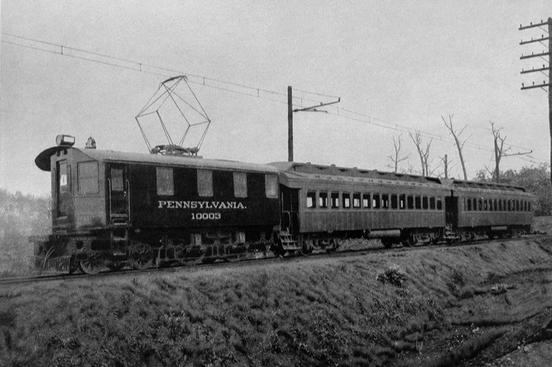
- Odd D #10003
Type and origin
- Power type: Electric
- Builder: Baldwin and Westinghouse
- Build date: 1907
- Total produced: 1
Specifications
- Configuration
  - Whyte: 4-4-0OE
  - AAR: 2-B
  - UIC: 2'B
- Gauge: 4 ft 8 1/2 in (1,435 mm) standard gauge
- Wheel diameter: 72 in (1,800 mm)
- Electric system/s: 11 kV, AC, 25 Hz
- Current pickup(s): Pantograph

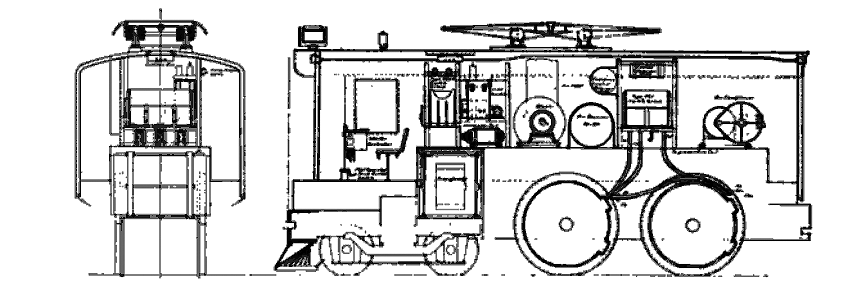
Internal diagram

Pennsylvania Railroad's Odd D #10003 was an experimental electric locomotive built in 1907 by Baldwin and Westinghouse. It had a 4-4-0 wheel arrangement in the Whyte notation, or 2-B in the AAR scheme. On the PRR, class D was assigned to 4-4-0 locomotives. Production classes of locomotive were assigned a number after the letter, but one-off locomotives were simply designated "Odd".

In testing, #10003 proved to be more stable at speed than the two class AA1 B-B locomotives the PRR had also constructed, so its 4-4-0 arrangement and high center of gravity was chosen as the design for the PRR's DD1 production locomotives.
