= Lima-Hamilton 2500HP Transfer Locomotive =

A-3177
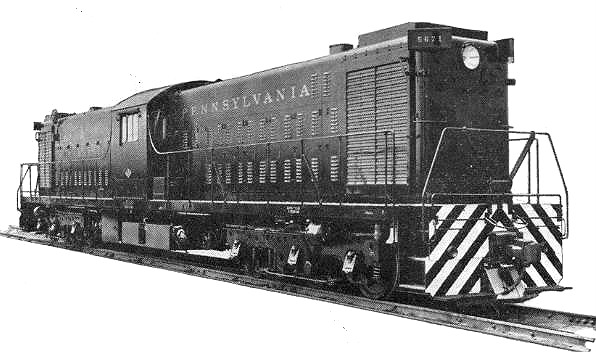
Type and origin
- Power type: Diesel-electric
- Builder: Lima-Hamilton Corporation
- Model: A-3177 (LT-2500)
- Build date: May 1950 – September 1951
- Total produced: 22
Specifications
- Configuration
  - AAR: C-C
  - UIC: Co′Co′
- Gauge: 4 ft 8 1/2 in (1,435 mm)
- Length: 73 ft (22 m)
- Prime mover: Hamilton Engines and Machinery T89SA (2)
- Engine type: 4-stroke diesel
- Aspiration: Turbocharged
- Displacement: 6,107 cu in (100.08 L) each
- Generator: Westinghouse 480C
- Traction motors: Westinghouse 370G (6)
- Cylinders: Inline 8 (2)
- Cylinder size: 9 in × 12 in (229 mm × 305 mm)
- Loco brake: Straight air
- Train brakes: Air
Performance figures
- Power output: 2,500 hp (1,860 kW)
Career
- Operators: Pennsylvania Railroad
- Class: LS25m
- Numbers: 5671–5683, 8943–8951
- Disposition: Scrapped

The A-3177 (LT-2500) was a diesel-electric transfer-unit locomotive, built by the Lima-Hamilton Corporation between 1950 and 1951. The A-3177 was the final locomotive model produced by Lima-Hamilton before the company merged with the Baldwin Locomotive Works in September 1951 to form the Baldwin-Lima-Hamilton Corporation (BLH).

All twenty-two units were ordered by the Pennsylvania Railroad, with the last one, #5683, completed on September 12, 1951, the day after BLH was formed. All were scrapped, with the last three being retired by 1967. The PRR ordered 22 more but agreed to receive 23 RT-624s from BLH instead.

== See also ==
- Baldwin DT-6-6-2000 and Baldwin RT-624, both similar center-cab style transfer units.
