= Pennsylvania Railroad class A5s =

Class of steam locomotives

PRR A5s
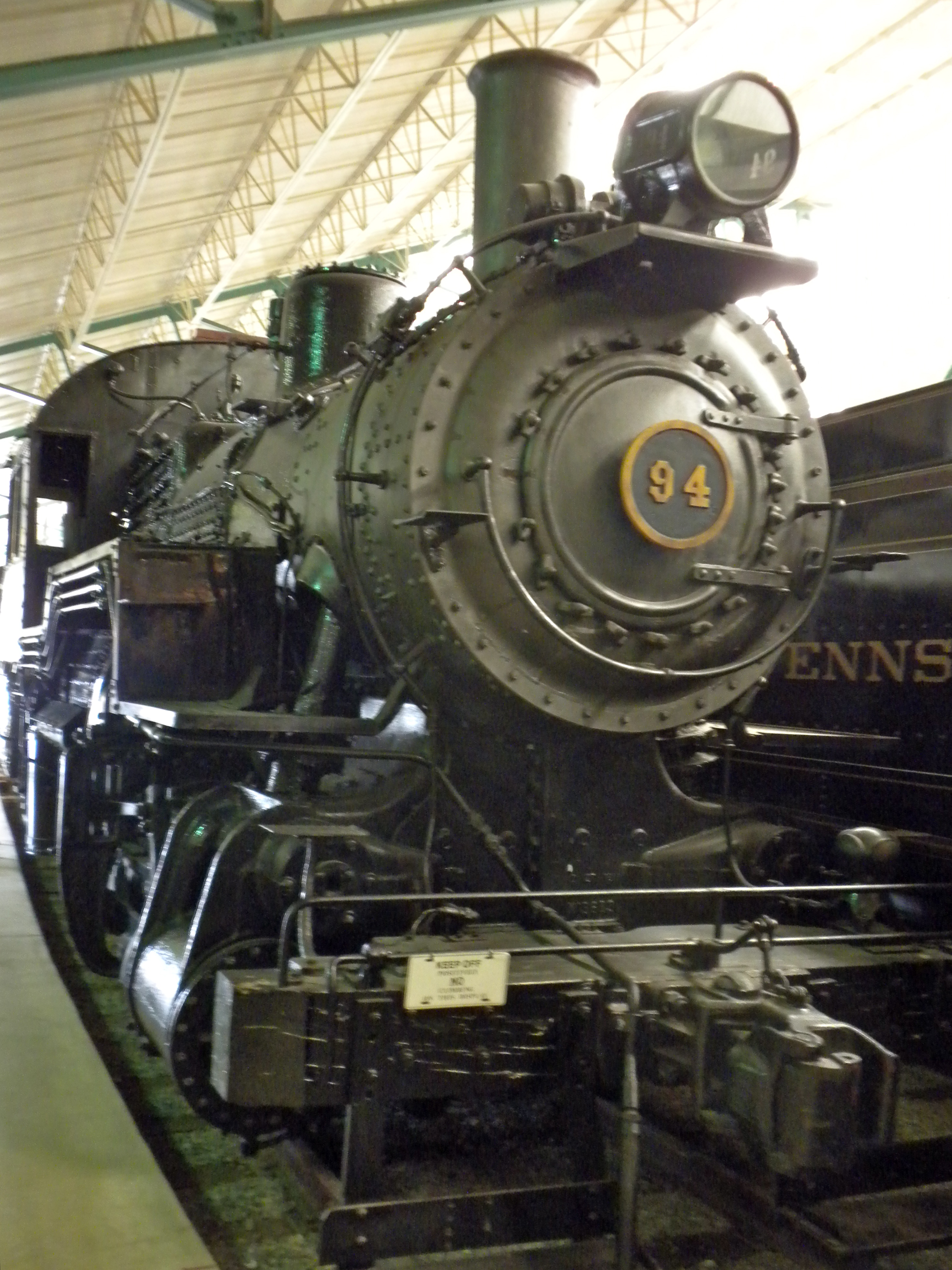
- PRR No. 94 at the Railroad Museum of Pennsylvania
Type and origin
- Power type: Steam
- Builder: Juniata Shops
- Build date: 1916–1924
- Total produced: 47
Specifications
- Configuration
  - Whyte: 0-4-0
- Gauge: 1,435 mm (4 ft 8 1/2 in)
- Driver dia.: 50 in (1,300 mm)
- Loco weight: 131,750 lb (59,760 kg)
- Fuel type: Coal
- Water cap.: 5,700 US gal (21,600 L)
- Firebox
  - Grate area: 38.3 ft^{2} (3.56 m^{2})
- Boiler pressure: 185 psi (1,280 kPa)
- Cylinders: Two
- Cylinder size: 20 in × 24 in (510 mm × 610 mm)
- Valve gear: Stephenson, Walschaerts
- Valve type: Slide valves, Piston valves
Performance figures
- Tractive effort: 30,190 lbf (134,300 N)
Career
- First run: 1916
- Last run: 1957
- Retired: 1957
- Withdrawn: 1957
- Preserved: No. 94
- Disposition: One preserved, remainder scrapped
- Switcher No. 94
- U.S. National Register of Historic Places
- Location within Pennsylvania Location within the United States
- Nearest city: Strasburg, Pennsylvania
- Coordinates: 39°58′56″N 76°9′40″W
- Area: 0.1 acres (0.040 ha)
- Built: 1917
- Architect: Juniata Shops
- MPS: Pennsylvania Railroad Rolling Stock TR
- NRHP reference No.: 79002281
- Added to NRHP: December 17, 1979

The Pennsylvania Railroad's class A5s was the most powerful class of 0-4-0 steam locomotivesever built. The Pennsy built 47 in its Juniata Shops between 1916 and 1924. They were retired by 1957. One is preserved at the Railroad Museum of Pennsylvania.

== History ==
By the 1920s, many railroads in the United States had retired their 0-4-0 steam locomotives as insufficiently powerful. But the PRR had need for switchers on complex and tight street, dockyard, and industrial trackage where even its 0-6-0 class Bs could not fit.

In 1948, the A5s began to be replaced by higher-horsepower diesel switchers, a process that concluded in 1957, when the PRR completed its conversion from steam to diesel power.

== Preservation ==
The lone extant A5 is No. 94, preserved at the Railroad Museum of Pennsylvania in Strasburg, Pennsylvania, across from the Strasburg Rail Road.
