= Pennsylvania Railroad class H8 =

Type of steam locomotive

- Consolidation Freight Locomotive No. 7688
- U.S. National Register of Historic Places
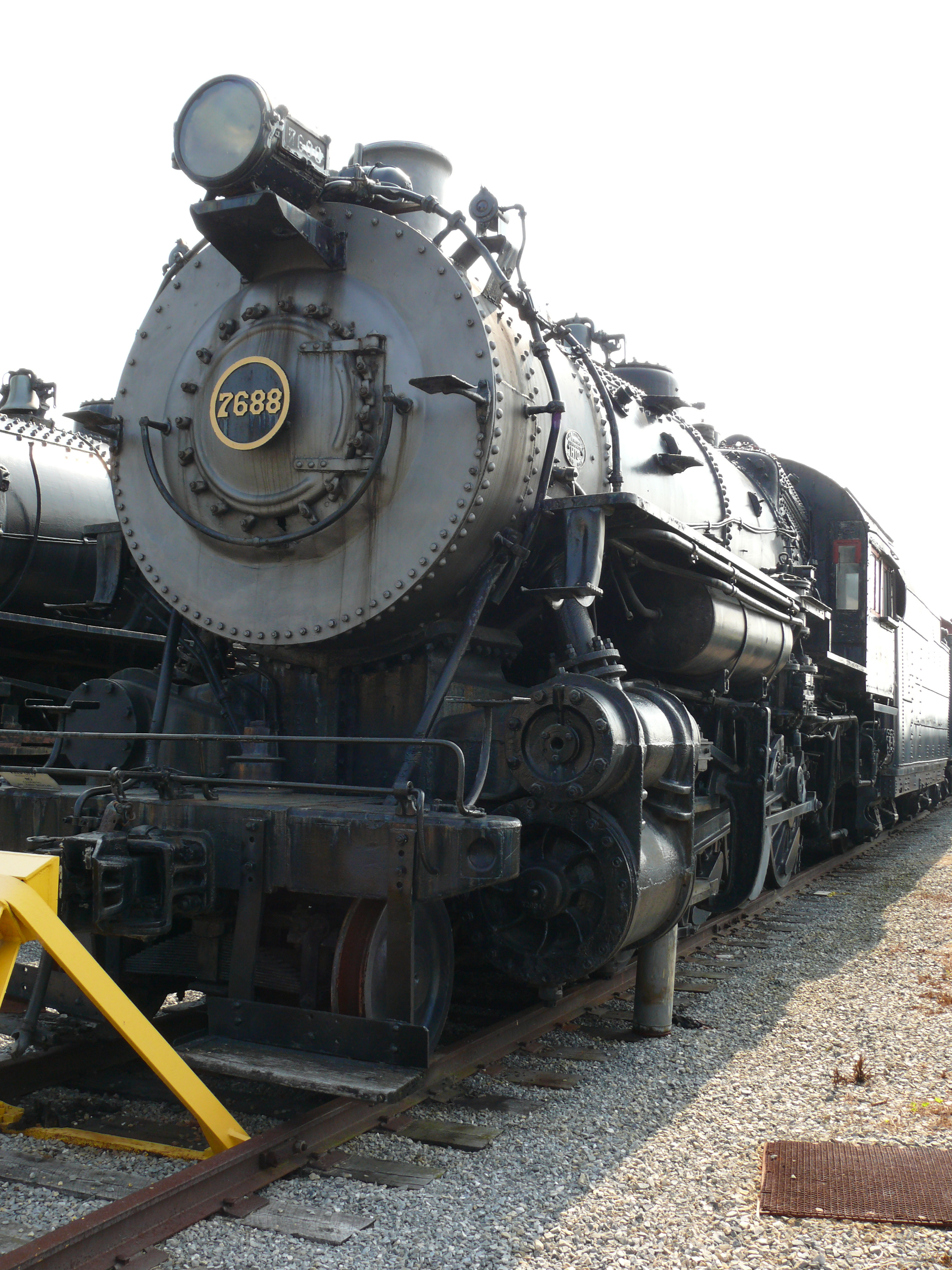
- PRR H10 #7688 at the Railroad Museum of Pennsylvania

- Location within Pennsylvania Location within the United States
- Nearest city: Strasburg, Pennsylvania
- Coordinates: 39°58′56″N 76°9′40″W
- Area: 0.1 acres (0.040 ha)
- Built: 1915
- Architect: Pennsylvania Railroad Co.
- MPS: Pennsylvania Railroad Rolling Stock TR
- NRHP reference No.: 79002264
- Added to NRHP: December 17, 1979

The Pennsylvania Railroad's class H8, H9s and H10s steam locomotives were of the 2-8-0 "Consolidation" type, the last three classes of such built by the railroad. The three classes differed only in cylinder diameter and thus tractive effort, each subsequent class increasing that measurement by an inch. The first H8 was built in 1907 and the last H10 in 1916; within a few years they were replaced on heavy freight assignments by 2-8-2s and 2-10-0. They became the railroad's standard light freight locomotive, replacing all other class H 2-8-0s, and a number remained in service until the end of PRR steam locomotive operation in 1957. 968 class H8 of various subclasses were constructed, along with 274 class H9s and 273 class H10s. A number of H8 locomotives were rebuilt to H9s specification.

Class H10s was built primarily for PRR Lines West, and featured a typical Lines West tender with sloping side coal boards at the top, to enable a bigger load of coal to be carried.

Some locomotives of this type were leased to the PRR-owned Long Island Rail Road, becoming the primary freight-hauling type on that system.

== Survivors ==
7688, an H10s built in 1915 by the Lima Locomotive Works, has been preserved by the Railroad Museum of Pennsylvania. It joins two earlier examples of the H class at the museum. #7688 was added to the National Register of Historic Places in 1979 as Consolidation Freight Locomotive No. 7688.
