= Railroad Museum of Pennsylvania =

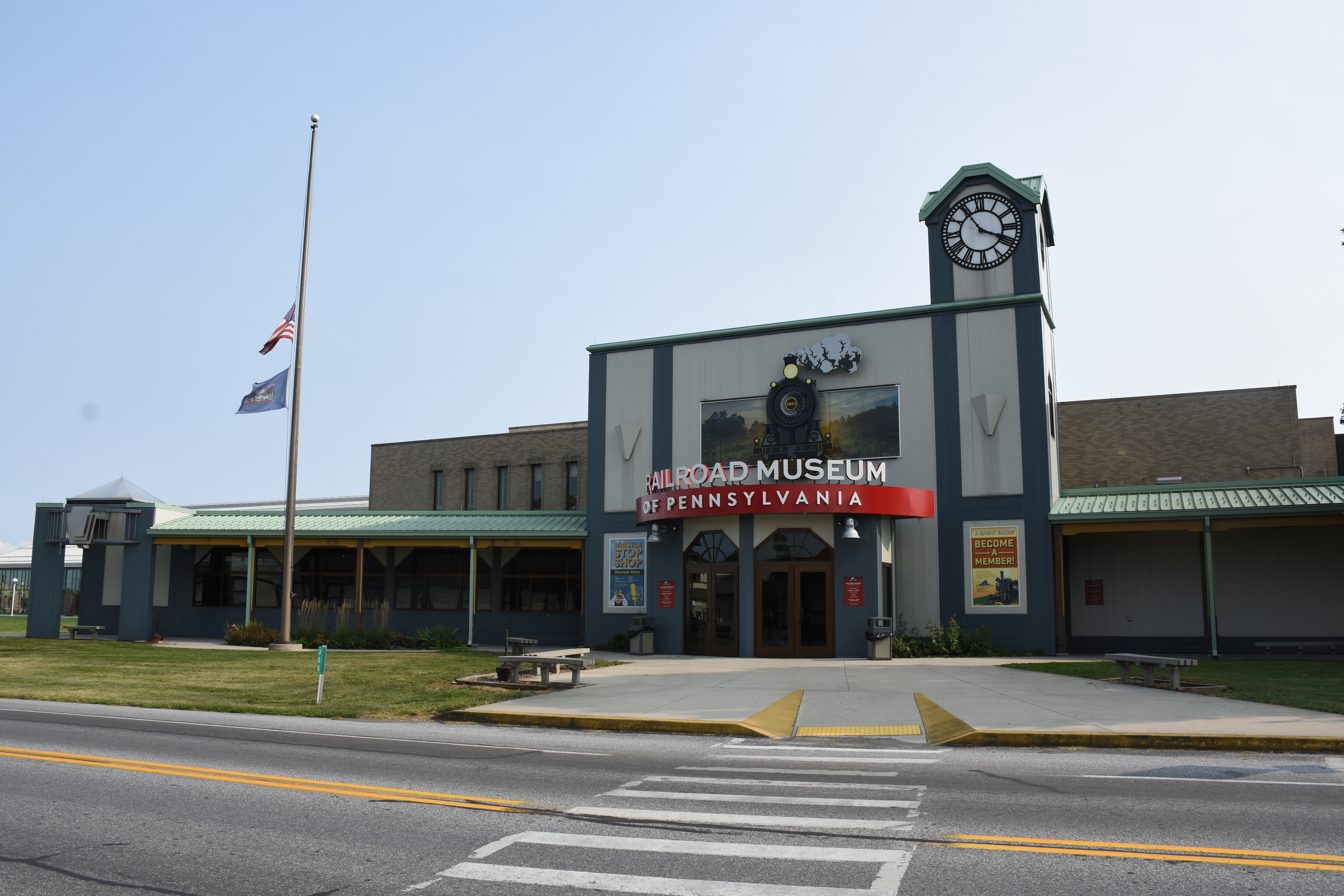
- The entrance of the Railroad Museum of Pennsylvania
- Established: 1975
- Location: Strasburg, Pennsylvania
- Coordinates: 39°58′57″N 76°9′37″W
- Type: Railroad museum
- Director: Patrick C. Morrison
- Website: rrmuseumpa.org

The Railroad Museum of Pennsylvania (RRMPA) is a railroad museum in Strasburg, Lancaster County, Pennsylvania.

The museum is located on the east side of Strasburg along Pennsylvania Route 741. It is administered by the Pennsylvania Historical and Museum Commission with the active support of the Friends of the Railroad Museum of Pennsylvania (FRM).

The museum's collection has more than 100 historic locomotives and railroad cars that chronicle American railroad history. Visitors can climb aboard various locomotives and cars, inspect a 62-ton locomotive from underneath, view restoration activities via closed-circuit television, enjoy interactive educational programs, and more.

The Railroad Museum of Pennsylvania was created to provide a historical account of railroading in Pennsylvania by preserving rolling stock, artifacts, and archives of railroad companies of the Commonwealth. However, the museum has branched out over the years, acquiring some pieces that are not directly related to Pennsylvania, but are important to the history of railroading.

In addition to full-size rolling stock pieces, a smaller exhibit gallery is on the second floor. The museum offers a number of other attractions, including several model railroad layouts, a hands-on educational center, and a library and archives.

== Building and grounds ==
Today, the Railroad Museum of Pennsylvania covers 18 acres. This includes Rolling Stock Hall, a second-floor changing-exhibit gallery, an observation bridge, a hands-on education center called Stewart Junction, an extensive library and archives, a restoration and paint shop, and an outdoor storage and display yard. Rolling Stock Hall and the second floor are both handicapped accessible. The yard is subject to weather closure.

The initial display building opened in 1975 as the first building constructed to be a railroad museum and featured an operating turntable from the Reading Company. The original building was roughly 45,000 square feet in size and included an observation bridge leading across Rolling Stock Hall, allowing visitors to see the trains from above. In June 1995, Rolling Stock Hall was enlarged to 100,000 square feet.

A newly designed entrance and gift shop were opened in June 2007. Some larger or more-modern engines and cars are displayed outdoors, and a new roundhouse to store some of the larger locomotives, in which construction officially began in July 2025 and is expected to be completed by late 2026 or early 2027.

The National Toy Train Museum and Choo Choo Barn are located nearby, and the Strasburg Rail Road is across the street from the museum.

== History ==
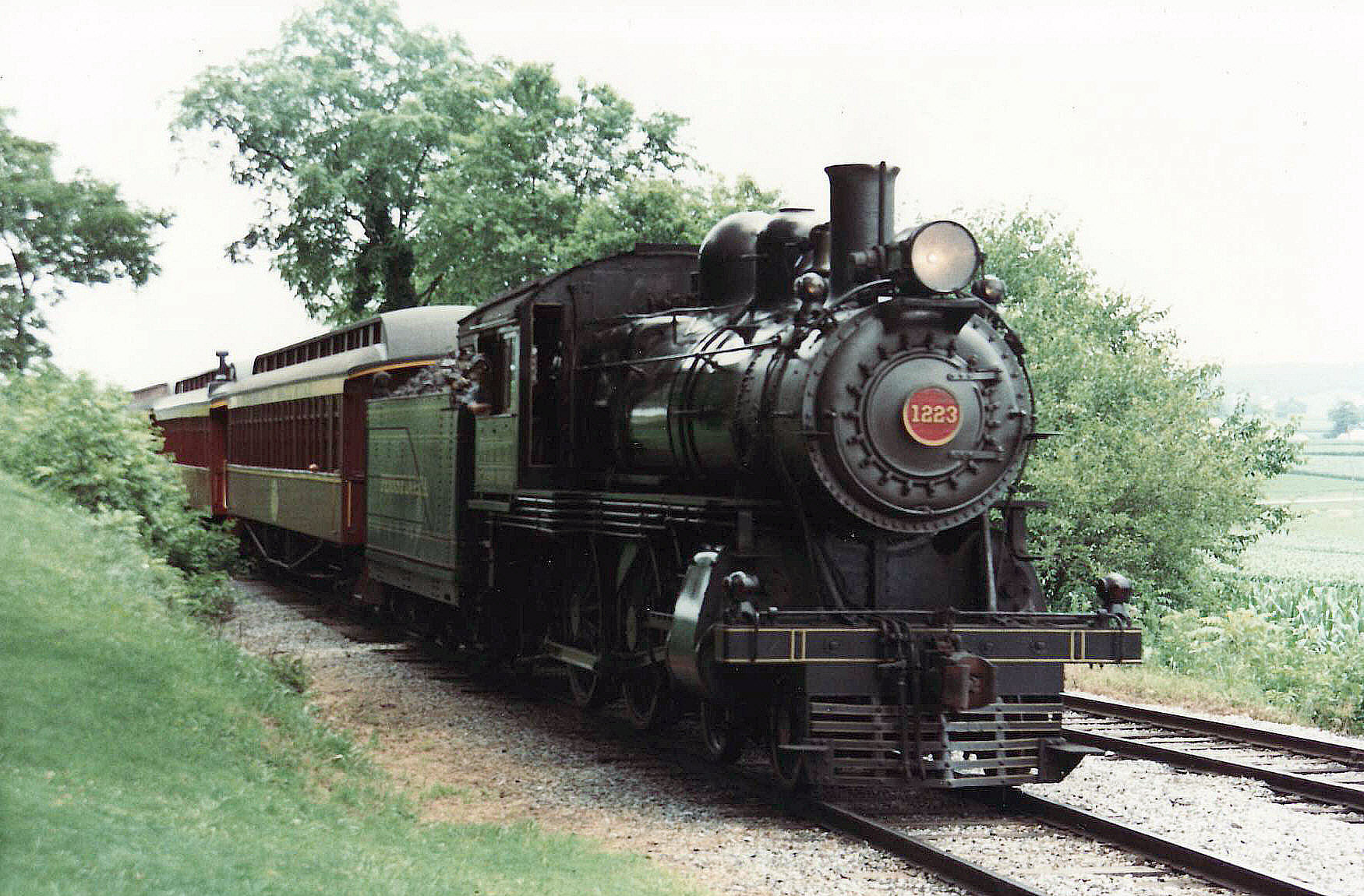
PRR engine #1223 in operation on the Strasburg Rail Road (1989)

For the 1939-1940 New York World's Fair, the Pennsylvania Railroad displayed several historic locomotives and cars it had collected over the years. After the fair had ended, the PRR decided to preserve the equipment that had been displayed, along with various other locomotives and rolling stock. All were moved to a roundhouse in Northumberland, Pennsylvania, and looked after by employees.

With the state looking to establish a railroad museum and PRR successor Penn Central looking to rid itself of the collection, in the late 1960s, it was decided that a museum was to be built adjacent to the Strasburg Rail Road in Strasburg, Pennsylvania. The engines were moved to the Strasburg Rail Road, where they were stored while the museum was under construction. Many of the Pennsylvania Railroad's Historic Collection were sent to Strasburg.

The Railroad Museum of Pennsylvania was created by an act of the state legislature in 1963. The site was purchased in 1966 and groundbreaking occurred in 1972. George Michener Hart was named Museum director and first employee. in 1969 and the Railroad Museum of Pennsylvania officially opened on April 1, 1975. As the museum acquired more equipment, they required more space, so in 1995, Rolling Stock Hall was expanded by 55,000 square feet. Today, the museum covers 18 acres of land, including 100,000 square feet indoors. A roundhouse for the larger locomotives that are currently stored outside was planned for 2018 but had not broken ground as of January 2019. In all, the museum holds roughly 100 pieces of rolling stock, some nearing 200 years old.

== Collection ==
=== Locomotives ===
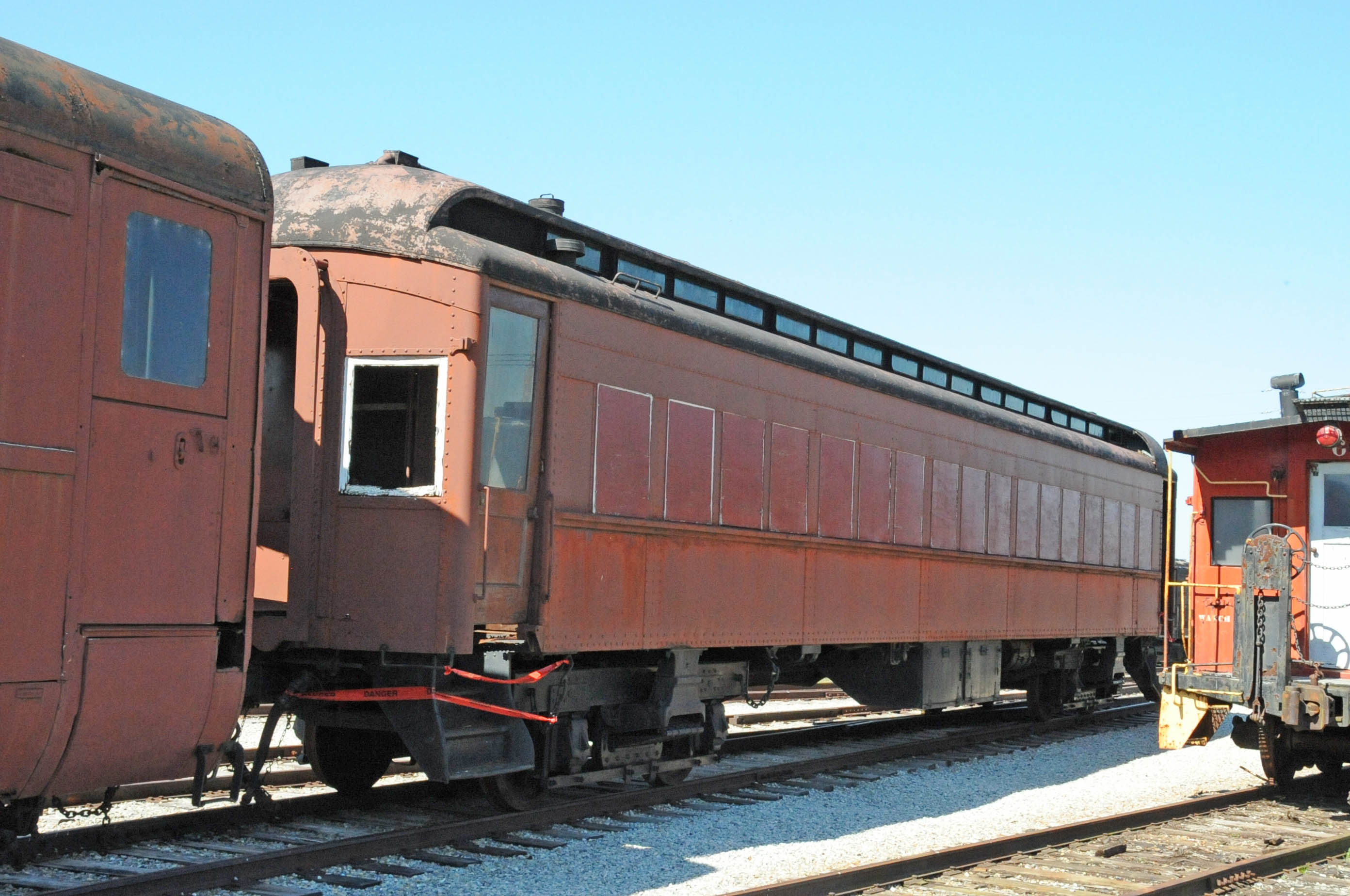
Steel Passenger Coach No. 1650

The collection is made up of more than a hundred historic locomotives and cars, many of which are part of the historical collection of the Pennsylvania Railroad. Following the 1939-1940 New York World's Fair, the PRR placed many of their historic rolling stock aside for preservation. The collection was stored in a roundhouse in Northumberland. In 1969, the collection was relocated to Strasburg, for storage at the Strasburg Rail Road until the museum's completion in 1975.

Some of these engines had operated on the Strasburg Rail Road for a number of years before being put back on display: PRR 1223, famous for its use in the 1969 film Hello, Dolly!, and PRR 7002 (originally #8063), a re-creation of the famous original PRR #7002, which set an unofficial land speed record in 1905 by traveling at 127.1 miles per hour. Both had been leased to the Strasburg Rail Road and retired permanently in 1989.

Other historic locomotives are featured at the museum, including the famous "Lindbergh Engine", PRR 460, which completed a 6-year cosmetic restoration in November 2016, and the oldest PRR locomotive #1187, built in 1888. The 1187 is placed over a pit, so visitors may go underneath and see the locomotive's underside. In 1895 #1187 suffered an accident but was barely damaged: however, the smoke box had to be rebuilt and it remained on the locomotive to this day. The official steam locomotive of the Commonwealth of Pennsylvania, PRR 3750, famous for pulling President Warren Harding's funeral train, is on display outside of the museum. Two replicas are also included in the Pennsylvania Historic Collection, the John Bull (built 1831) and the John Stevens (built 1825). In August 2023 the 185-year-old Rocket was removed from its prior home, the Franklin Institute, to be renovated for display at the museum.

Locomotives in the collection include the Tahoe, a 2-6-0 built in 1875 for use on the Virginia & Truckee Railroad, and two fireless steam locomotives: (Bethlehem Steel #111 and Pennsylvania Power & Light #4094-D). Not to be missed are examples of the three most common geared locomotives: the Shay (Leetonia Railway #1), the Heisler (Chicago Mill & Lumber Company #4), and the Climax (W. H. Mason Company #1).

Electric locomotives include two PRR GG1 locomotives: the original prototype PRR 4800, and PRR #4935. Two other electric locomotives include Amtrak E60 #603, and EMD AEM-7 #915, which were donated by Amtrak in 2003 (603) and 2015 (915) respectively.

=== Cars ===
The museum also has a large collection of rail cars. Many of these are examples of cars seen on the Pennsylvania Railroad, including a P70 passenger car, a B60 Baggage car, and an N5c caboose. On display also are several wood-bodied freight and passenger cars, and one of the first all-steel passenger cars, PRR 1651.

=== Other ===
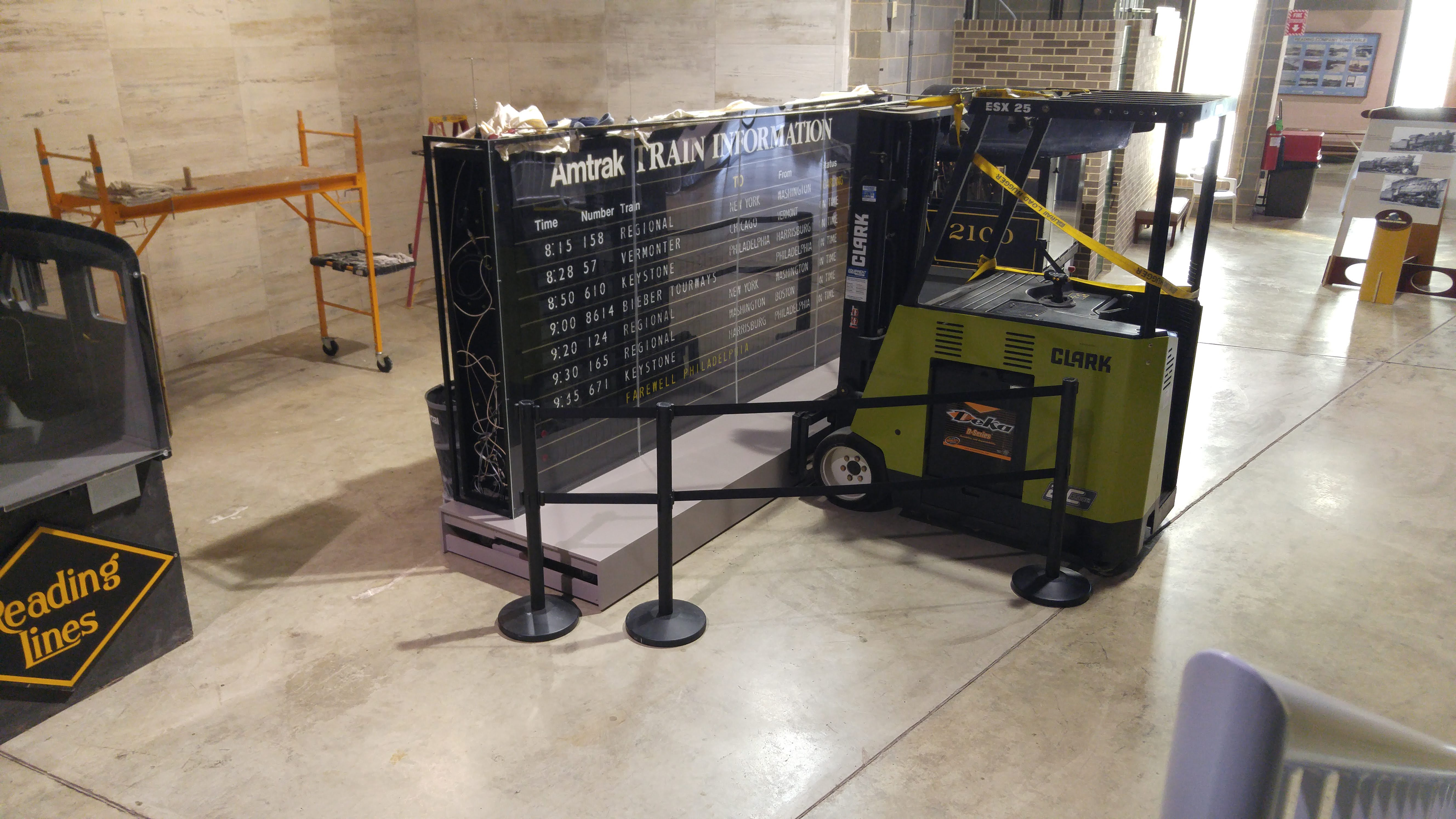
Solari Board from 30th Street Station awaiting installation

The Solari board that displayed train departure times in Philadelphia's 30th Street Station is in the museum's collection. The board, created by Solari di Udine, was the last such one at an Amtrak station. It was replaced with a digital board on January 26, 2019, and has been on static display at the museum since July 2019.

A book available in the gift shop, The Haunted Railroad Museum of Pennsylvania, reveals that apparitions may be associated with some older items of equipment.

== List of locomotives ==
Locomotives
Name	Class	Unit Type	Images	Manufacturer	Year built	Notes
Reading Company Rocket	Rocket	Steam		Braithwaite, Milner & Co.	1838	Built in the United Kingdom
Virginia and Truckee Railroad 20 Tahoe	8-28d Mogul	Steam		Baldwin Locomotive Works, Burnham, Perry, Williams & Co.	1875	Retired in 1944
Waimanalo Sugar Company "Olomana"	Olomana	Steam		Baldwin Locomotive Works	1883	Ran excursions on the Grizzly Flats Railroad between 1953-1977. Walt Disney also called the locomotive "the nearest thing to a Mickey Mouse engine he had ever seen"
Pennsylvania Railroad 1187	H3	Steam		Altoona Works (PRR)	1888	This was the first locomotive class was the first to introduce the Belpaire Firebox in the United States
Pennsylvania Railroad 7002	E7	Steam		Juniata (PRR)	1902	This locomotive set an unofficial speed record of 127.1 MPH on June 12, 1905
Pennsylvania Railroad 1223	D16	Steam		Juniata (PRR)	1905	Was featured in several films such as Hello, Dolly!
Pennsylvania Railroad 2846	H6sb	Steam		Baldwin Locomotive Works	1905	The only of its class surviving
Leetonia Railway 1	Class C Shay	Steam		Lima Locomotive Works	1906	
Pennsylvania Railroad 3936-3937	DD1	Electric (Third Rail)		Altoona Works (PRR)	1911	Retained by the Penn Central until it was donated in 1979
WH Mason Co. 4	Class B Climax	Steam		Climax Locomotive Works	1913	
Pennsylvania Railroad 460	E6	Steam		Juniata (PRR)	1914	Nicknamed the "Lindbergh Engine" for delivering footage of Charles Lindbergh's returning transatlantic flight
Pennsylvania Railroad 7688	H10	Steam		Lima Locomotive Works	1915	Used for troop service during WW2
Pennsylvania Railroad 520	L1	Steam		Baldwin Locomotive Works	1916	The only of its class surviving
Pennsylvania Railroad 1670	B6	Steam		Juniata (PRR)	1916	Under cosmetic restoration
Pennsylvania Railroad 94	A5	Steam		Juniata (PRR)	1917	One of the heaviest 0-4-0s ever built
Chicago Mill & Lumber Company 4	2 Truck Heisler	Steam		Heisler Locomotive Works	1918	
Reading Company 1251	B-4a	Steam		Reading Shops	1918	The only of its class surviving
Pennsylvania Railroad 3750	K4	Steam		Juniata (PRR)	1920	Pulled Warren G. Harding's political campaign and funeral train
Pennsylvania Railroad 5741	G5	Steam		Juniata (PRR)	1924	Was considered the standard locomotive for PRR commuter rail service
Vulcan Iron Works 1		Diesel		Vulcan Iron Works	1930	
Pennsylvania Railroad 6755	M1b	Steam		Juniata (PRR)	1930	Likely the largest surviving PRR locomotive
Pennsylvania Railroad 4800	GG1	Electric (Overhead)		GE	1934	Prototype GG1
Pennsylvania Railroad 5690	B1	Electric (Overhead)		Allis-Chalmers, Altoona Works, Westinghouse	1934	The only of its class surviving
Pennsylvania Railroad John Stevens Replica	John Stevens	Steam		Altoona Works (PRR)	1939	Built for the 1939-1940 World's Fair
Pennsylvania Power and Light 4094 "D"	8-30	Fireless steam		Heisler Locomotive Works	1940	Largest fireless locomotive built
Camden and Amboy Railroad John Bull Replica	John Bull Replica	Steam		Altoona Works (PRR)	1940	Built for the 1939-1940 World's Fair
Bethlehem Steel 111	4-19	Fireless steam		Heisler Locomotive Works (PRR)	1941	Used as an emergency backup engine at the factory right before donation
Pennsylvania Railroad 4935	GG1	Electric (Overhead)		Altoona Works (PRR)	1943	Used for excursions between 1977-1980
Pennsylvania Railroad 5901	EP20 (E7)	Diesel		EMD	1945	
Maryland and Pennsylvania Railroad 81	NW2	Diesel		EMD	1946	
Pennsylvania Power and Light N/A	18-ton			Plymouth Locomotive Works	1949	
Baldwin Locomotive Works	S-12	Diesel		Baldwin Locomotive Works	1951	Prototype unit
Lone Star Cement Co. N/A	5-ton	Diesel	N/A	Brookville	1951	
Pennsylvania Railroad 7006	GP9	Diesel		EMD	1955	
Pennsylvania Railroad 4465	E44	Electric (Overhead)		GE	1963	The only of its class surviving
Conrail 2233	GP30	Diesel		EMD	1963	
Monongahela Connecting Railroad 701	Century 415	Diesel		ALCO	1968	
Amtrak 603	E60MA	Electric (Overhead)		GE	1976	Only rebuilt E60 surviving
Amtrak 915	AEM-7AC	Electric (Overhead)		EMD	1981	First Amtrak AEM-7 to be preserved

== See also ==
- List of heritage railroads in the United States

== Sources ==
- Volkmer, William D (January 2004). "The Pennsy at Northumberland". Trains. pp. 66–71.
