= Rocket (Reading locomotive) =

British-built railroad steam locomotive

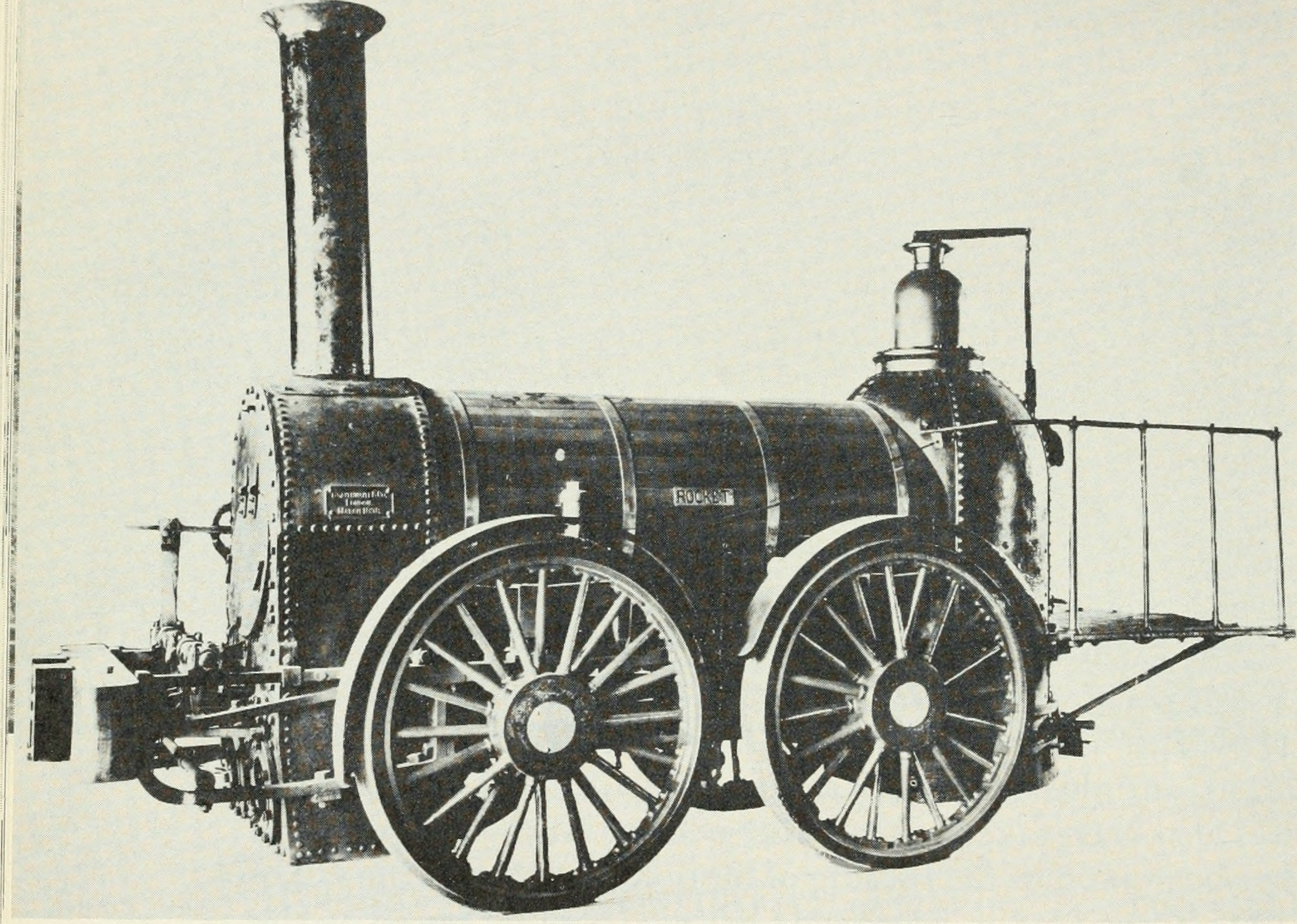
- Rocket, c. 1900
Type and origin
- Power type: Steam
- Builder: Braithwaite, Milner & Company
- Build date: 1838; 188 years ago
Specifications
- Configuration
  - Whyte: 2-2-0 (built as 0-4-0)
- Gauge: 4 ft 8 1/2 in (1,435 mm) standard gauge
- Driver dia.: 4 ft 1 1/2 in (1,257 mm); 3 ft 5 3/4 in (1,060 mm) 1862–1893
- Wheelbase: 4 ft 10 in (1,473 mm)
- Loco weight: 8.4 short tons (7.5 long tons; 7.6 t) 1838–1862; 11.7 short tons (10.4 long tons; 10.6 t)
- Cylinder size: 10 1/2 in (267 mm) diameter × 16 in (406 mm) stroke
Career
- Operators: Reading Company
- Numbers: 1
- Delivered: March 1838
- First run: May 1838
- Retired: March 1879
- Restored: 1893
- Current owner: Conrail
- Disposition: Preserved; on static display at the Railroad Museum of Pennsylvania

Rocket is a historic British-built steam locomotive that was operated in the United States by the Reading Railroad. It is the oldest surviving locomotive that was owned by the Reading, and one of the few remaining early steam locomotives in North America that were originally imported from the United Kingdom.

Residing in the Franklin Institute in Philadelphia for almost a century, Rocket was moved in 2023 to the Railroad Museum of Pennsylvania in Strasburg, Pennsylvania, where it is on static display.

== History ==
Rocket was the third locomotive purchased by the Philadelphia and Reading Railroad, and the first to be imported after one from Baldwin Locomotive Works and another built by Ross Winans. At the time, it was common for railroads to purchase British locomotives through purchasing agents or other third parties rather than directly with a manufacturer. Locomotives were also shipped across the Atlantic Ocean, dismantled in crates, along with the drawings and schematics needed to reassemble them. Rocket was ordered from Braithwaite, Milner and Company of London; the first of eight locomotives ordered by the railroad from the manufacturer. It arrived in Philadelphia, Pennsylvania, in March 1838 before being was transported to Reading, Pennsylvania, via the Schuylkill Canal. The locomotive "participated" in the inauguration of the Reading–Pottstown line in May, and began operating passenger service in July 1838.

Advancements in locomotive technology quickly made Rocket obsolete and, in 1845, it was transferred to maintenance of way duties. The locomotive was retired from service in 1879 having traveled 310,164 miles (499,161 km) for the Reading Railroad. In 1893, the locomotive was refurbished and given a paint scheme of black with green wheels before it was exhibited at the World's Columbian Exposition in Chicago, Illinois. Rocket was also displayed at the Louisiana Purchase Exposition in Saint Louis, Missouri, in 1904, and the Baltimore and Ohio Railroad's "Fair of the Iron Horse" in Halethorpe, Maryland, from September 24 to October 12, 1927. The Reading Railroad loaned the locomotive for display at the Franklin Institute in 1933. In the 1970s, Rocket was inherited by Conrail after the Reading Railroad went bankrupt, and its rail assets taken over by Conrail.

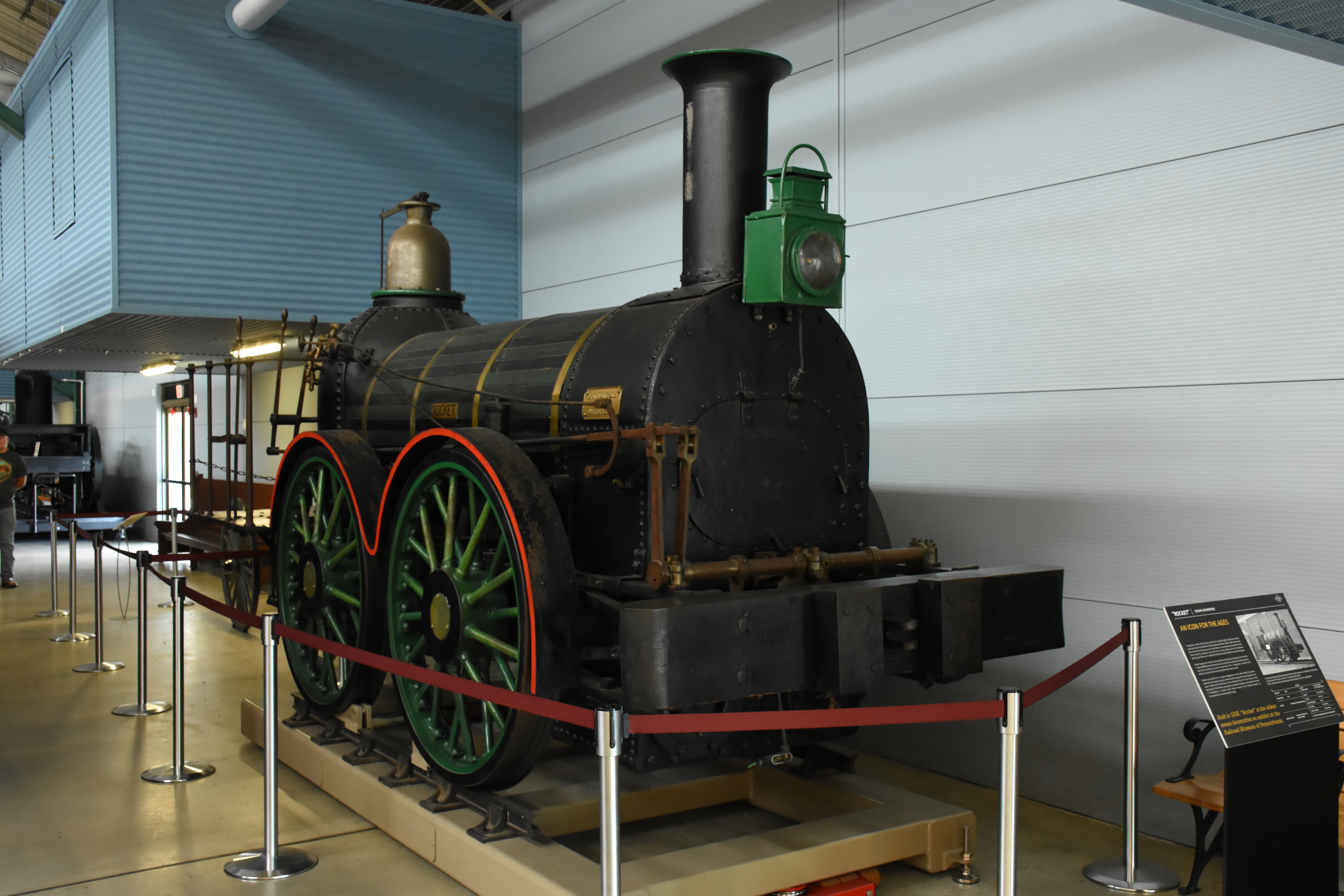
Rocket at the Railroad Museum of Pennsylvania

As part of a "re-imagining" of the exhibit that included Rocket and the Baldwin 60000, the Franklin Institute no longer had space for the locomotive. Conrail opted to have Rocket relocated to the Railroad Museum of Pennsylvania in Strasburg in August 2023. Though the Franklin Institute building had been constructed around both locomotives, Rocket was able to be hoisted out of a window by crane over the course of three days.

Rocket is one of three remaining British-built, early steam locomotives in North America, along with John Bull and Samson.

== Sources ==
- Oliver, Smith Hempstone (1956). "The First Quarter-Century of Steam Locomotives in the United States". United States National Museum Bulletin (210). Washington, D.C.: Smithsonian Institution.
- A Century of Reading Company Motive Power. Philadelphia: Reading Company. 1941.
