= Pennsylvania Railroad 643 =

Preserved B4 class 0-6-0 steam locomotive

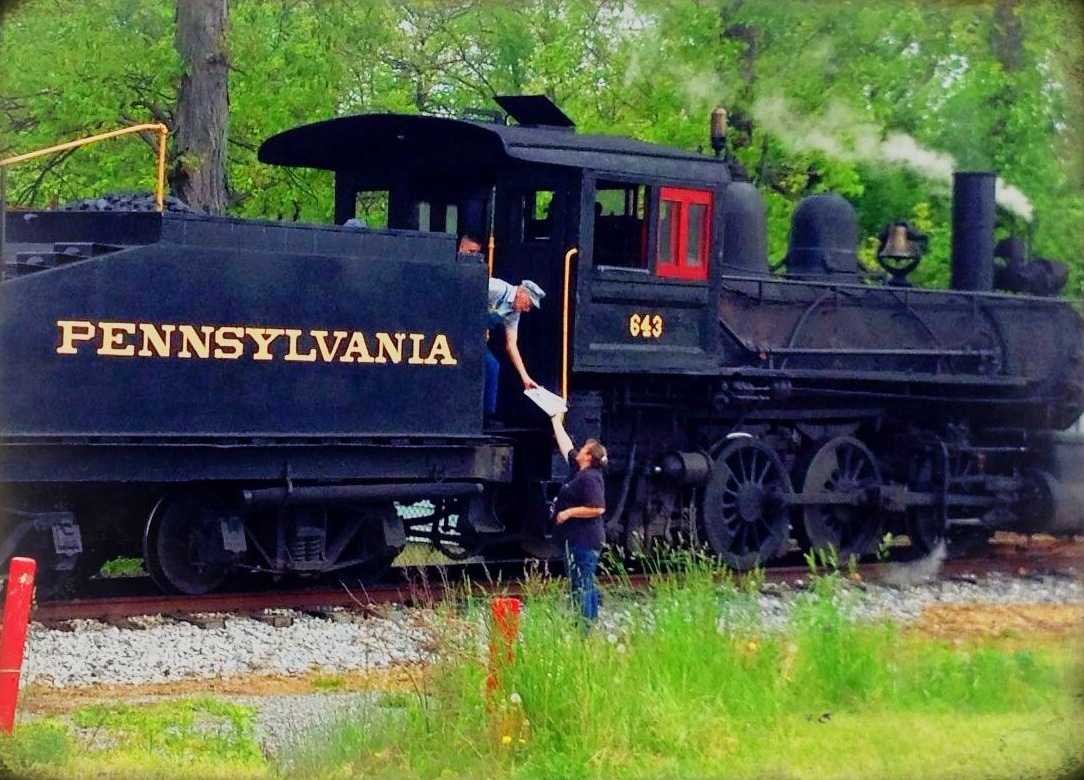
- No. 643 at the Williams Grove Railroad, May 2013
Type and origin
- Power type: Steam
- Builder: Juniata Shops
- Serial number: 2184
- Build date: June 1901
- Rebuild date: 1945
Specifications
- Configuration
  - Whyte: 0-6-0
- Gauge: 4 ft (1,219 mm)
- Driver dia.: 50 in (1 m)
- Wheelbase: 11 ft 6 in (4 m)
- Height: 14 ft 15 in (5 m)
- Adhesive weight: 90,000 lb (40.8 t)
- Loco weight: 125,000 lb (56.7 t)
- Total weight: 105 lb (0.0 t)
- Fuel type: Coal
- Water cap.: 5,000 US gal (19,000 L; 4,200 imp gal)
- Boiler: 60 in (1.52 m) diameter
- Boiler pressure: 160 psi (1.10 MPa)
- Heating surface
  - Firebox: 155 sq ft (14 m^{2})
  - Total surface: 1,353 sq ft (126 m^{2})
- Cylinders: Two, outside
- Cylinder size: 19 in × 24 in (483 mm × 610 mm)
- Valve gear: Stephenson
- Valve type: Piston valves
- Loco brake: Air
- Train brakes: Air
- Couplers: Knuckle
Performance figures
- Tractive effort: 23,570 lbf (104.8 kN)
- Factor of adh.: 3.95
Career
- Operators: Pennsylvania Railroad; Central Iron & Steel Company; Phoenix Iron & Steel Company; Phoenix Steel Corporation; Williams Grove Railroad
- Class: B4a
- Numbers: PRR 643; CI&SC 5; PI&SC 5; PSC 5
- Retired: 1959
- Restored: 1961
- Current owner: Williams Grove Historical Steam Engine Association
- Disposition: Operational

Pennsylvania Railroad 643 is a B4a class 0-6-0 "Switcher"-type steam locomotive, built by the Pennsylvania Railroad (PRR)'s Juniata Shops in 1901. It is preserved and operated by the Williams Grove Railroad (WGRR) in Cumberland County, Pennsylvania. As of 2026, No. 643 is the only PRR steam locomotive in operating condition.

== History ==
No. 643 was built in June 1901 by the Pennsylvania Railroad (PRR)'s Juniata Shops in Altoona, Pennsylvania. (Note: Attributed to multiple sources:)

The PRR operated the locomotive as a yard switcher for 16 years. In 1917, the railroad deemed it obsolete and sold it to the Central Iron and Steel Company, which renumbered it as No. 5. It was rebuilt in 1945, receiving a new boiler made by the H.K. Porter Company.

The locomotive continued to run as Central Iron and Steel was absorbed by the Phoenix Iron & Steel Company, which was later renamed the Phoenix Steel Corporation. When the company ceased operations in 1959, No. 5 was retired and stored in an abandoned mill building.

In 1961, the engine was purchased by the new Williams Grove Historical Steam Engine Association, which renumbered it back to 643 and restored it to operating condition. It has since hauled excursion trains on the 1-mile track at the Williams Grove Railroad (WGRR) in Cumberland County, Pennsylvania. (Note: Attributed to multiple sources:)

In 2001, No. 643 was removed from service for an overhaul; it was returned to service in 2006.

In April 2015, No. 643 operated for the annual Williams Grove Steam Show. In June 2021, the locomotive celebrated its 120th birthday. On June 19–21, 2026, No. 643 celebrated its 125th birthday; it received a fresh coat of paint, pulled several excursion passenger trains, and did freight photo runbys during Old Train Days weekend for the United States Semiquincentennial.
