= Pennsylvania Railroad class G5 =

Pennsylvania Railroad G5s
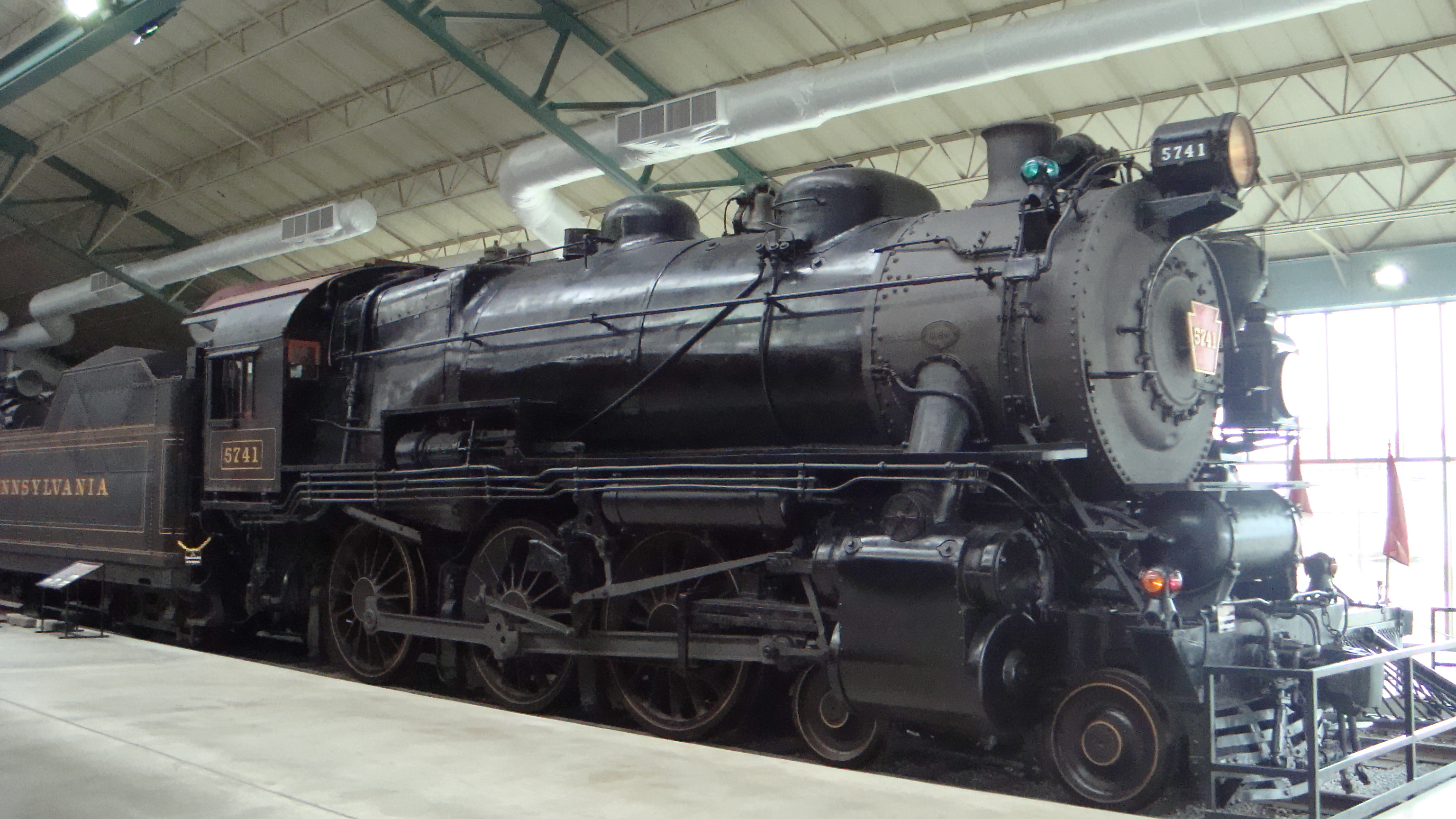
Type and origin
- Power type: Steam
- Builder: Juniata Shops
- Build date: 1923 - 1929
- Total produced: 121
Specifications
- Configuration
  - Whyte: 4-6-0
- Driver dia.: 68 in (1,727 mm)
- Axle load: 66,500 lb (30,200 kg; 30.2 t)
- Adhesive weight: 178,000 lb (81,000 kg; 81 t)
- Total weight: 237,000 lb (108,000 kg; 108 t)
- Fuel type: Coal
- Firebox
  - Grate area: 55.19 sq ft (5.127 m^{2})
- Boiler pressure: 205 psi (1.41 MPa)
- Cylinders: 2
- Cylinder size: 24 in × 28 in (610 mm × 711 mm)
- Valve gear: Walschaerts
- Valve type: Piston valves
Performance figures
- Tractive effort: 41,328 lbf (183.84 kN)
- Factor of adh.: 4.31
Career
- Operators: Pennsylvania Railroad, Long Island Rail Road
- Retired: 1948 - 1955
- Preserved: PRR No. 5741, LIRR Nos. 35 and 39
- Disposition: Three preserved, remainder scrapped

The Pennsylvania Railroad G5s is a class of 4-6-0 steam locomotives built by the PRR's Juniata Shops in the mid-late 1920s. It was designed for passenger trains, particularly on commuter lines, and became a fixture on suburban railroads (notably the Long Island Rail Road) until the mid-1950s.

== History and design ==
In the 1920s, the Pennsylvania Railroad needed a locomotive for commuter trains. When the first G5s rolled out of the Juniata Shops in 1923, the Pennsylvania Railroad had not built a 4-6-0 in more than two decades. Mechanical Engineer William F. Kiesel Jr., who designed the engine, used the boiler from an E6s Atlantic and designed one of the largest and most powerful ten-wheelers ever built. Smaller drive wheels than an Atlantic and the lack of a trailing truck put more weight on the drivers and produced an engine with great power and acceleration but a lower top speed. The 4-6-0 wheel arrangement could provide sufficient tractive effort, (41,000 lbf (180 kN) of force) while at the same time allowing the locomotive to accelerate the train more quickly. Such a design was ideal for the frequent stops on PRR commuter lines.

90 G5s locomotives were built for the PRR between 1923 and 1925 at the railroad's Juniata Shops in Altoona, Pennsylvania. Thirty-one more were built between 1924 and 1929 for the Long Island Rail Road, then a PRR subsidiary. Like the I1s Decapod, the G5s was infamous among enginemen for rough riding; locomotive historian Alvin Staufer said "Riding qualities were sacrificed for power when Pennsy designed these G5s Ten Wheelers."

== Service on the Pennsylvania Railroad ==
PRR's 90 G5s locomotives were used between cities and suburban areas. Many G5s's were in the Pittsburgh area, but the class was also used in New Jersey and around Chicago and Fort Wayne. However, the class was not limited to commuter service. In his book Pennsy Power, Alvin Staufer cites a G5s-led milk train that ran 145 miles daily through rural Pennsylvania, trailing an old combine for the occasional passenger - which sometimes included a hunter that the crew would let off at a clearing in the woods. Fan trips as early as the 1930s also were headed by ten-wheelers: "'Off the Beaten Track' excursions covering branch lines frequently drew G5s power, since larger engines were prohibited." Work trains were another assignment too menial for mainline power but fine for the versatile G5s, which often elicited adjectives such as "gutsy," "squat," "tough," or "husky." By 1929, it was the only 4-6-0 class remaining in service on the PRR.

== Service on Long Island ==
The G5s was the primary passenger locomotive on the Long Island Railroad until the end of steam operations, sharing the duty with K4s's and other G5s leased from the PRR, as well as diesels such as the Alco RS3 that ultimately replaced them. The G5s locomotives on Long Island differed slightly from those produced for the PRR, with a larger tender typically used by the K4s.

The G5s were the last steam locomotive to operate in revenue service on Long Island. The last seven in operation, numbers 21, 24, 32, 35, 38, 39, and 50, were in service until late 1955. In October of that year, a special "End of Steam Ceremony" was held at Hicksville. Engines 35 and 39 each pulled a single coach to the station with local Boy Scouts on board. Upon arriving, the coaches were uncoupled from the two steam engines, and each coupled to an Alco RS3 diesel locomotive. 35 and 39 were then coupled nose to nose, and ran west to the shops at Morris Park. 35 would run one more fantrip the following week.

== Preservation ==
The G5 is one of the best-preserved classes of PRR steam locomotives, with three surviving examples.

- Freight Locomotive No. 5741
- U.S. National Register of Historic Places
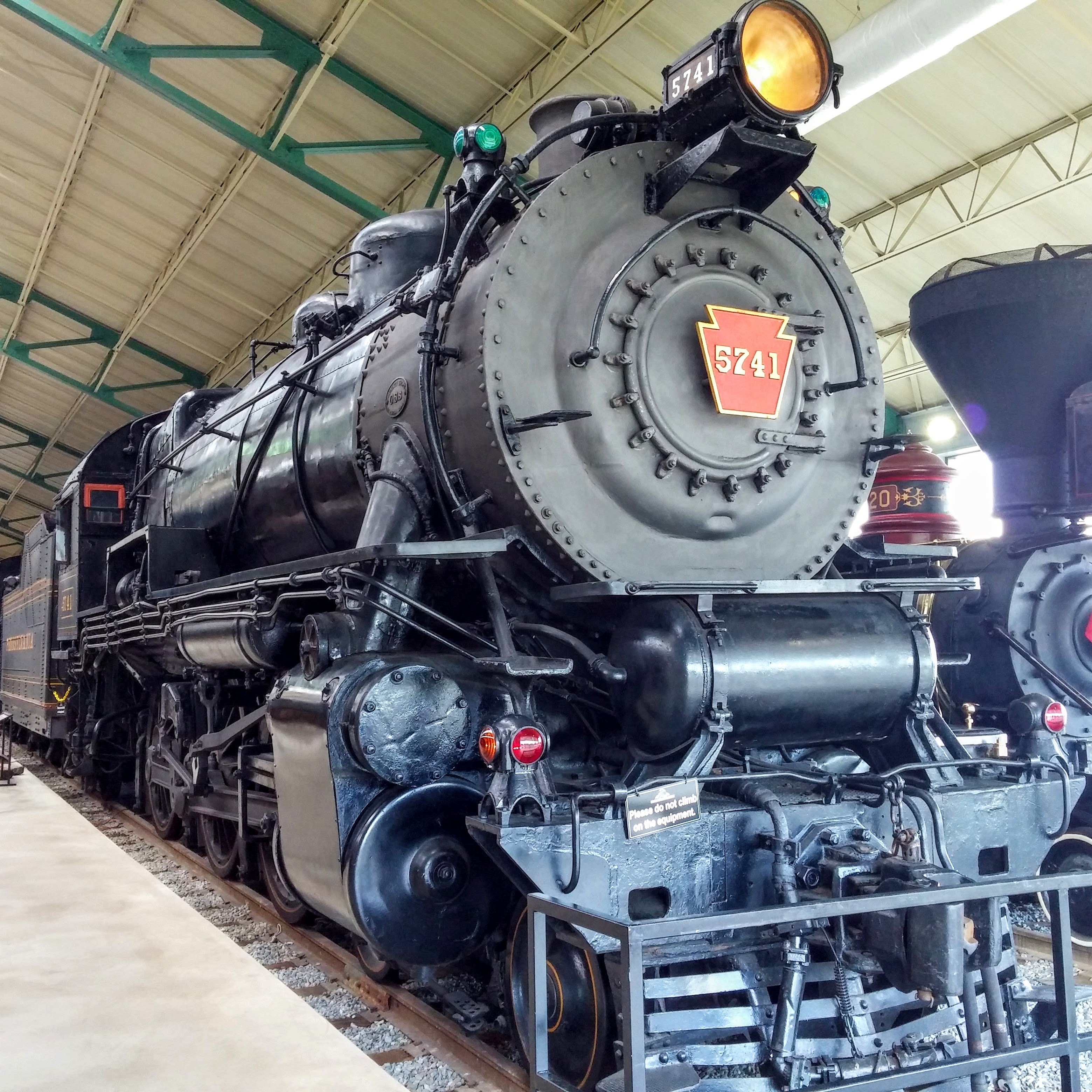
- PRR No. 5741 on display at the Railroad Museum of Pennsylvania

- Location within Pennsylvania Location within the United States
- Nearest city: Strasburg, Pennsylvania
- Coordinates: 39°58′56″N 76°9′40″W
- Area: 0.1 acres (0.040 ha)
- Built: 1924
- Architect: Pennsylvania Railroad Co.
- MPS: Pennsylvania Railroad Rolling Stock TR
- NRHP reference No.: 79002268
- Added to NRHP: December 17, 1979

PRR 5741 - Selected by the PRR itself for preservation upon its retirement, currently on permanent static display in the Railroad Museum of Pennsylvania. 5741 was added to the National Register of Historic Places in 1979 as Freight Locomotive No. 5741.

LIRR 35 - Donated by the LIRR to Nassau County. 35 was displayed in Eisenhower Park until 1978 and is now based at the Oyster Bay Railroad Museum in Oyster Bay, NY. The museum initially worked to secure funding for the full restoration of the locomotive to operating condition, including a conversion to oil firing, and a new tender. #35 was inspected by contractors from Steam Operations Corps, and thoroughly cleaned in preparation for the locomotive being shipped to Alabama for further restoration, but those plans fell through. In March 2024, it was announced that the locomotive would be reassembled and cosmetically restored with the running gear operational so the locomotive could be towed over museum trackage.

LIRR 39 - Offered by the LIRR to Suffolk County, it was rejected by the Suffolk County Board of Supervisors in 1956. LIRR then offered #39 for display to the Carriage Museum in Stony Brook, New York (presently, The Long Island Museum of American Art, History, and Carriages), where it was exhibited until 1980.

In 1980, the Project #39 Restoration Committee moved the locomotive to Riverhead, New York, for restoration. In 1992, the engine came under the care of the Railroad Museum of Long Island, (RMLI), based at Greenport and Riverhead, New York. The boiler and firebox are currently being restored at the Strasburg Railroad Company, Strasburg, Pennsylvania, while the rest of the locomotive remains at Riverhead.

In 2013, the RMLI initiated a nationwide fundraising effort to raise $900,000 towards the restoration of the locomotive. The restoration included an agreement to lease it to the Strasburg Rail Road for a period of 48 years, with Strasburg Rail Road contributing over $1 million additional towards its restoration. The locomotive may possibly be in full operation on the Strasburg Railroad in three to five years after fundraising goals are met.
