= Pennsylvania Railroad 4935 =

GG1 class electric locomotive

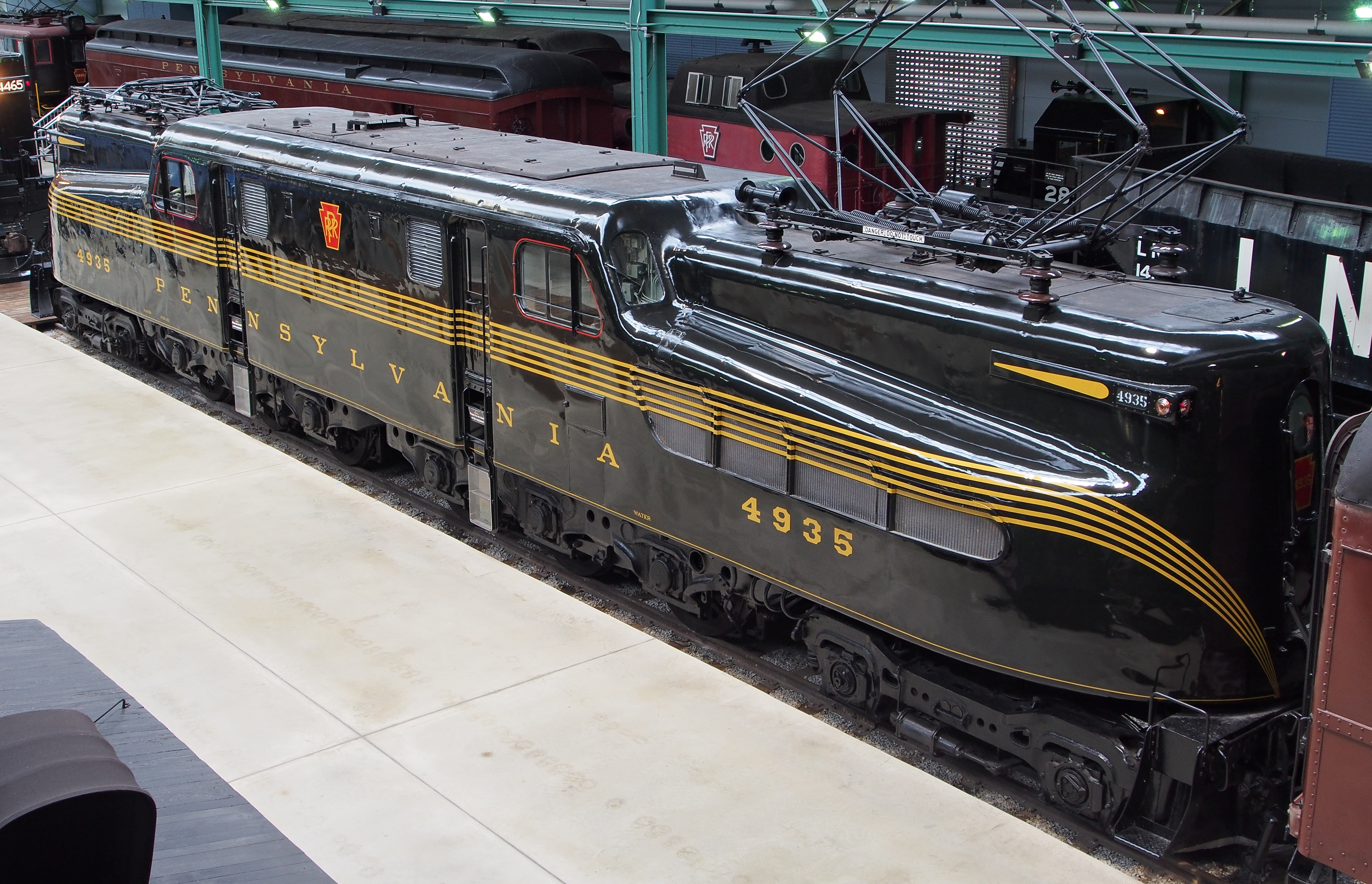
- No. 4935 at the Railroad Museum of Pennsylvania
Type and origin
- Power type: Electric
- Builder: Juniata Shops
- Serial number: GE 4434
- Build date: 1943
Specifications
- Configuration
  - AAR: 2-C+C-2
- Gauge: 4 ft 8 1/2 in (1,435 mm) standard gauge
- Driver dia.: 57 in (1,448 mm)
- Wheelbase: 13 ft 8 in (4.17 m)
- Length: 79 ft 6 in (24.23 m)
- Width: 10 ft 4 in (3.15 m)
- Height: 16 ft 0 in (4.88 m) over locked-down pantograph
- Adhesive weight: 303,000 lb (137,000 kg)
- Loco weight: 475,000 lb (215,000 kg)
- Electric system/s: 11,000 V AC, 25 Overhead
- Current pickup: Dual pantographs
Performance figures
- Maximum speed: 100 mph (160 km/h)
- Power output: Continuous: 4,620 hp (3,450 kW)
Career
- Operators: Pennsylvania Railroad, Penn Central, Amtrak
- Class: GG1
- Numbers: PRR 4935
- Retired: October 10, 1980
- Restored: May 9, 1977
- Current owner: Pennsylvania Historical and Museum Commission
- Disposition: On static display

Pennsylvania Railroad 4935 is a preserved GG1 class electric locomotive. It is one of sixteen remaining Pennsylvania Railroad class GG1 locomotives, and one of two (along with Pennsylvania Railroad 4800) at the Railroad Museum of Pennsylvania.

== History ==
The Pennsylvania Railroad class GG1 was built to haul longer passenger trains at high speeds, particularly on the Northeast Corridor and the Main Line, during the PRR's massive electrification projects of the 1930s. Constructed in 1943 at Juniata Shops, No. 4935 was among the last of the GG1 series to be built. Like most GG1 locomotives, it was transferred to Penn Central Transportation Company when the PRR merged into Penn Central in 1968, then to Amtrak when it briefly took over intercity passenger service in 1971.

=== Restoration ===
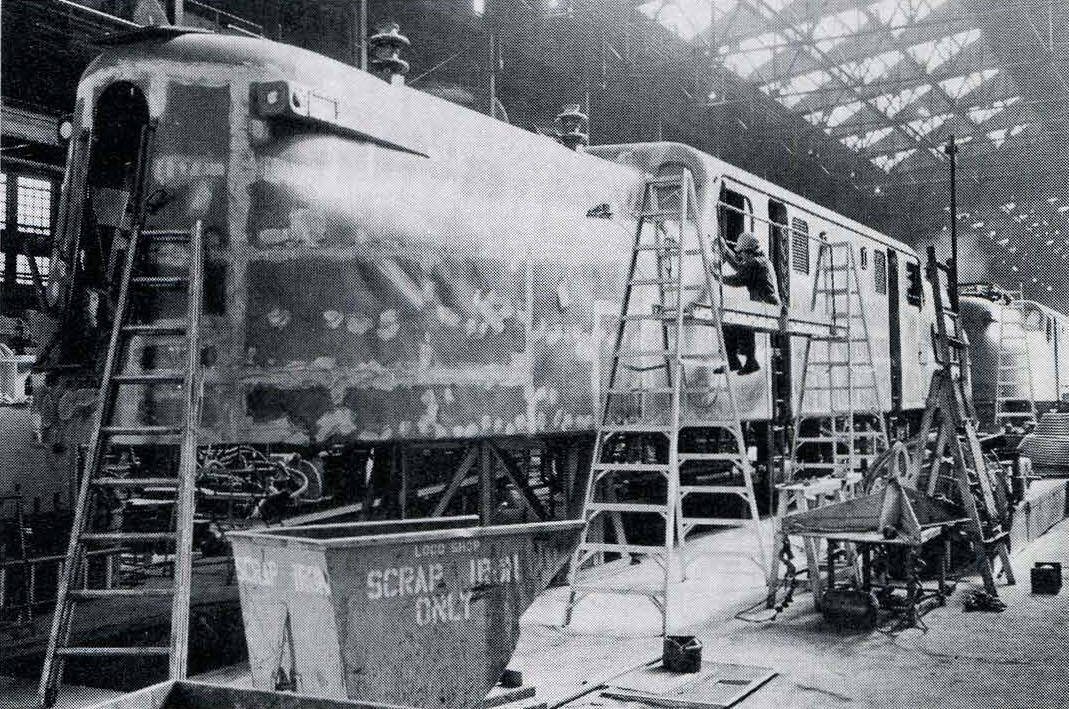
PRR 4935 under restoration in 1977

In 1976, railfan and United States Department of Transportation economist Howard Serig approached Penn Central about the possibility of restoring a GG1 to its original condition, but Penn Central was not interested. That November, Serig proposed the idea in a column for Trains magazine. A friend of Serig brought the proposal to Amtrak president Paul Reistrup. Reistrup approved the plan on January 18, 1977.

A private group, the Friends of the GG1 Committee (F.O.G.G.), was formed within days to coordinate funding from National Railway Historical Society chapters. Raymond Loewy, who designed the smooth shell and paint scheme of the GG1, was later enlisted as the honorary chairman. FOGG raised $10,000 within two months; on March 9, the group signed an agreement with Amtrak. 4935 was chosen because it retained its original number and air intakes and was already in good shape.

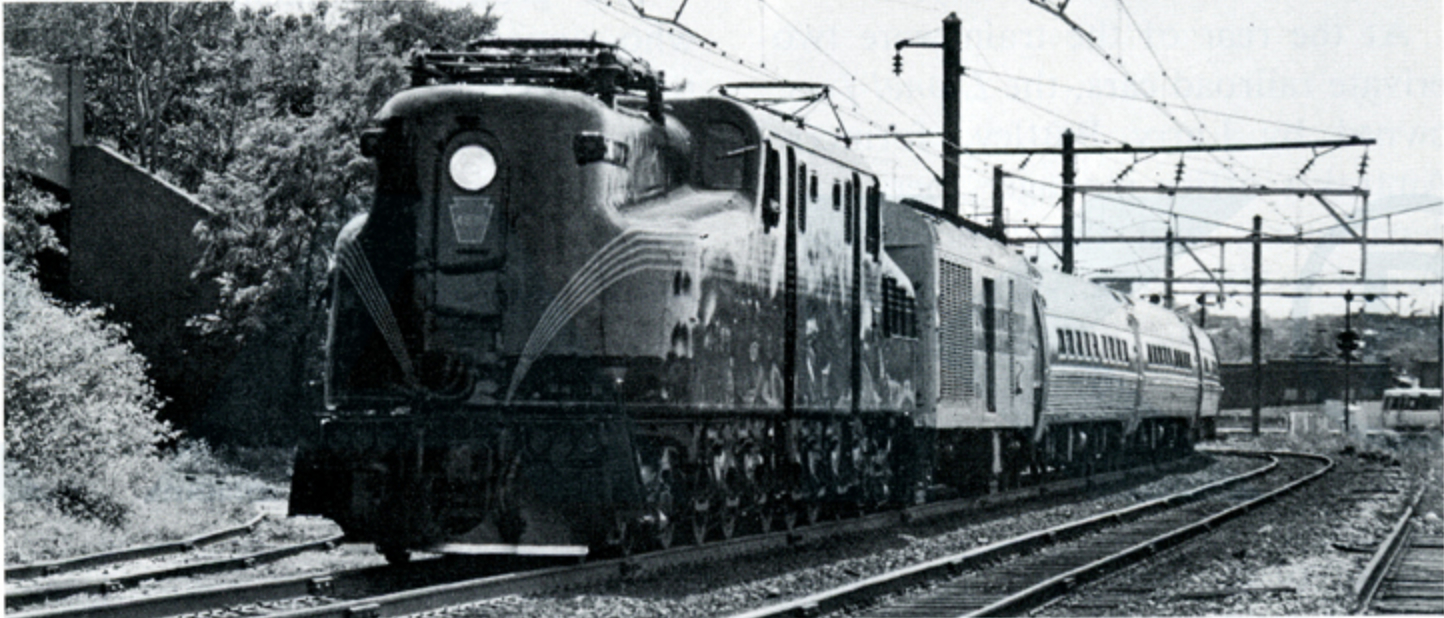
The rebuild 4935 leads the Murray Hill on its return to revenue service on May 15, 1977

On March 25, 1977, 4935 was taken to the Wilmington Shops in Wilmington, Delaware. Amtrak replaced truck bearings, a blower, the boiler (used for steam heating of passenger cars), and made other mechanical repairs. The locomotive was grit-blasted, primed, and repainted into original PRR livery of dark Brunswick green with five golden stripes.

The entire refurbishment was complete on May 9, 1977. No. 4935 was tested near Perryville on May 12. On May 15, 1977, the 4935 was returned to service with a rededication ceremony, after which it pulled the northbound Murray Hill in revenue service.

=== Retirement ===
The locomotive made its last revenue run on October 10, 1980, pulling either the Silver Star or the Silver Meteor. It was discovered that $80,000 in repairs were needed. On March 20, 1981, the locomotive was sold for $5,000 to F.O.G.G. member Russell Wilcox, who then donated it to the Railroad Museum of Pennsylvania in Strasburg, Pennsylvania.

On February 19, 1983, after being on public display in several locations, the 4935 was moved to Strasburg. At the museum it joined former Pennsylvania Railroad GG1 #4800 (the original and prototype GG1 electric). Today it is on indoor static display in the museum's Rolling Stock Hall. Thanks to the 1977 restoration, it is considered to be in the best condition of the 16 remaining GG1 locomotives.
