= Pennsylvania Railroad class B6 =

Class of 372 American 0-6-0 locomotives

Pennsylvania Railroad B6
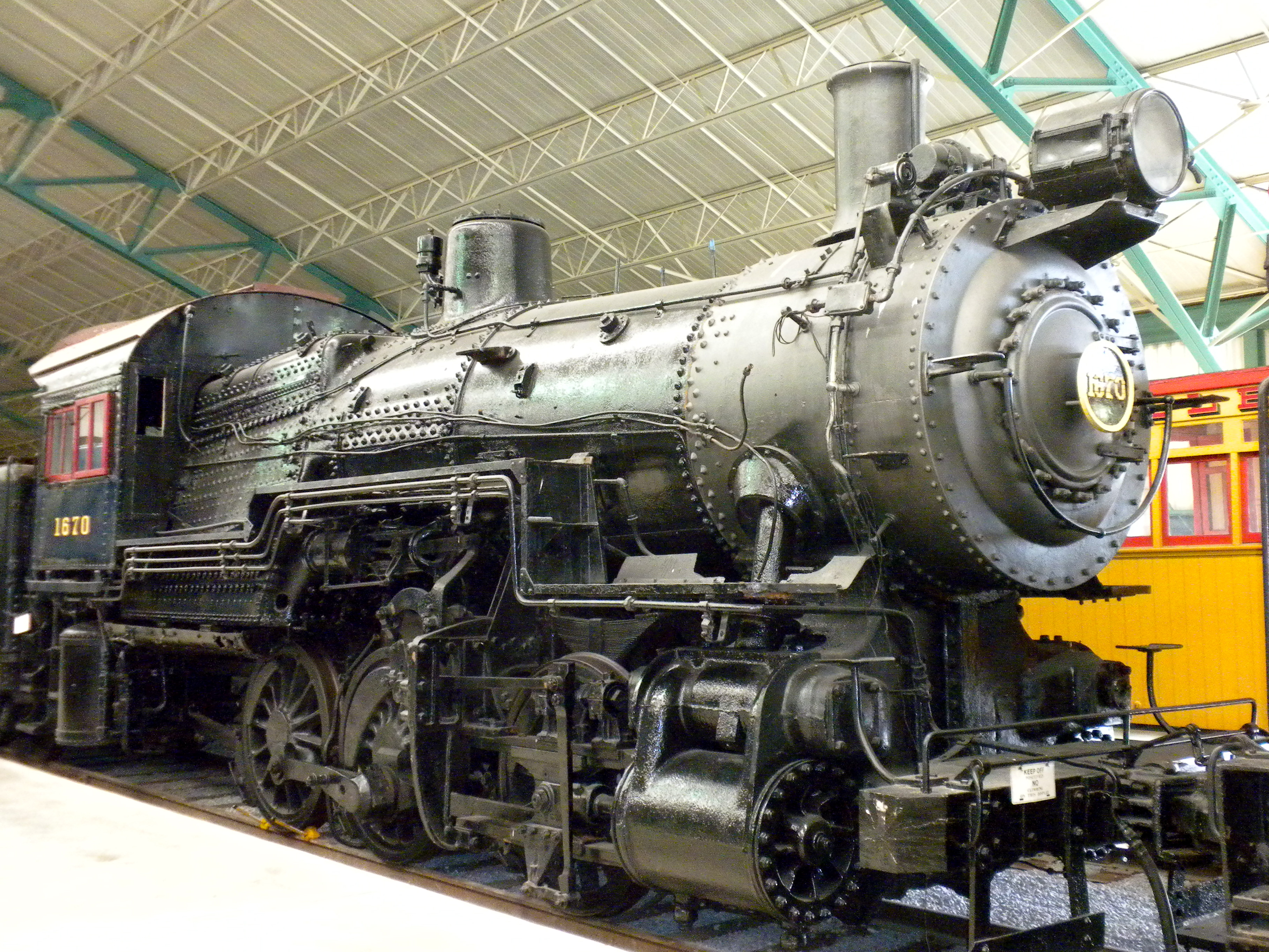
- PRR No. 1670 at the Railroad Museum of Pennsylvania in 2010
Type and origin
- Power type: Steam
- Builder: Altoona Works; Baldwin Locomotive Works; Lima Locomotive Works
- Build date: 1902–1912 (B6); 1912–1913 (B6sa); 1916–1920 (B6sb)
- Total produced: B6: 79; B6sa: 55; B6sb: 238
Specifications
- Configuration
  - Whyte: 0-6-0
  - UIC: C (B6) Ch (B6s/B6sa/B6sb)
- Gauge: 4 ft 8 1/2 in (1,435 mm) standard gauge
- Driver dia.: 56 in (1.422 m)
- Wheelbase: locomotive: 11 ft 6 in (3.51 m)
- Fuel type: Coal
- Boiler pressure: 205 psi (1.41 MPa)
- Cylinders: Two
- Cylinder size: 22 in × 24 in (559 mm × 610 mm)
- Valve gear: B6: Stephenson; B6sa/B6sb: Walschaerts
- Valve type: Piston valves
Performance figures
- Tractive effort: 36,144 lbf (160.8 kN)
Career
- Retired: 1949 - 1959
- Preserved: Nos. 60 (B6sa) and 1670 (B6sb)
- Disposition: Two preserved, remainder scrapped
- Switcher No. 1670
- U.S. National Register of Historic Places
- Location within Pennsylvania Location within the United States
- Nearest city: Strasburg, Pennsylvania
- Coordinates: 39°58′56″N 76°9′40″W
- Area: 0.1 acres (0.040 ha)
- Built: 1916
- Architect: Juniata Shops
- MPS: Pennsylvania Railroad Rolling Stock TR
- NRHP reference No.: 79002280
- Added to NRHP: December 17, 1979

The Pennsylvania Railroad's class B6 was its most successful class of switcher locomotive, or as the PRR termed them "shifter". The PRR preferred the 0-6-0 wheel arrangement for larger switchers, whereas on other railroads the 0-8-0 gained preference. The PRR generally used 2-8-0s when larger power was required.

== History ==
Altoona Works constructed the prototype B6 in 1902. The B6 had the Pennsylvania's trademark square-shouldered Belpaire firebox and 56-inch (1.422 m) drivers. They were constructed as saturated steam engines, rebuilt with superheaters later as class B6s, and had Piston valves and Stephenson valve gear. A total of 79 were built by Baldwin and Lima, in addition to Altoona, between 1902 and 1913.

The next version built was the B6sa, 55 of which were built at Altoona during 1913–1914. These had radial-stay fireboxes, common elsewhere but rare on the Pennsylvania, and they replaced the Stephenson gear with the more modern Walschaerts valve gear. Steam delivery pipes were outside, like all other PRR modern power. All were built superheated.

Finally, during 1916–1920, 238 of class B6sb were built. These were the final, definitive type, and had a Belpaire firebox, but were otherwise little changed from the B6sa. The final 97 locomotives had piston valves mounted outboard of the cylinders, instead of inbound as previously built, giving the cylinder assemblies an outward cant at the top, rather than inward.

All B6sa and B6sb locomotives were retrofitted with power reverse to make the frequent back-and-forth of switching quicker and easier.

The last PRR locomotive in active service was #5244, leased to Union Transportation of New Egypt, New Jersey until July 1959. This was considered quite an achievement considering the Pennsylvania Railroad's extensive steam program.

In 1939, toy train manufacturer Lionel introduced their version of Pennsy's B6 in several variations including a scale version (scale couplers and smaller flanges to operate on special track) along with six versions of what would later become known as "semi-scale."

Two B6s survive:

- B6sb #1670 was saved in the PRR's historic collection at Northumberland, Pennsylvania and was donated to the Railroad Museum of Pennsylvania along with the majority of that collection.

- B6sa #60 was on a siding in Hockessin, Delaware, along the Wilmington and Western Railroad. It has a larger tender, from a 2-8-0 Consolidation, but it is intact, albeit in poor condition. In 2019–2020, it was donated to the Historic Red Clay Valley Inc., and the locomotive remains on a siding near Mt. Cuba. B6sa #60 then was moved to the Wilmington and Western's railroad shops in Wilmington, Delaware on May 9, 2024 where it will be cosmetically restored and then put on display as an exhibit in Lewes, Delaware.
