= Olomana (locomotive) =

Preserved narrow gauge American 0-4-2ST locomotive

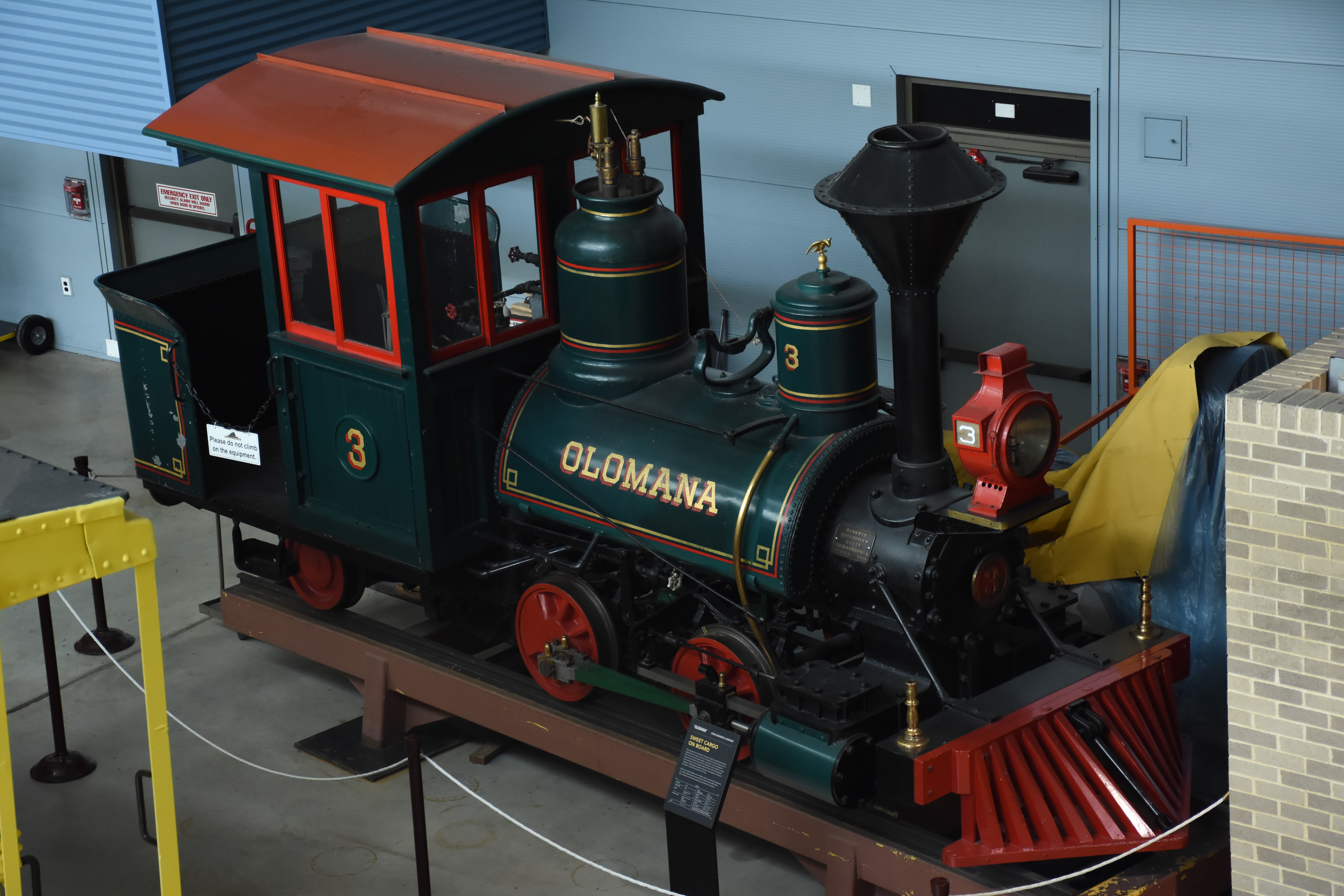
- Olomana at the Railroad Museum of Pennsylvania in 2025
Type and origin
- Power type: Steam
- Builder: Baldwin Locomotive Works
- Build date: 1883
Specifications
- Configuration
  - Whyte: 0-4-2ST
- Gauge: 3 ft (914 mm)
- Driver dia.: 24 in (610 mm)
- Length: 25 ft (8 m)
- Loco weight: 18,000 lb (8,200 kg)
- Fuel type: Coal
- Boiler pressure: 140 psi (965 kPa)
- Cylinders: Two, outside
- Cylinder size: 7 in × 10 in (178 mm × 254 mm)
- Valve gear: Stephenson
- Valve type: Side valve
- Loco brake: Steam
- Train brakes: Steam
- Couplers: Link-and-pin
Career
- Operators: Waimanalo Sugar Company
- Class: 6-8 1/3C16
- Retired: 1944 (revenue service); 1977 (excursion service)
- Restored: 1952–1953
- Current owner: Smithsonian Institution
- Disposition: On static display

The Olomana is a 3 ft (914 mm) narrow gauge 0-4-2ST steam locomotive built by Baldwin Locomotive Works (BLW) in 1883 for the Waimanalo Sugar Company in Hawaii. It is currently in the Railroad Museum of Pennsylvania, on loan from the Smithsonian Institution. It was the third self-propelled vehicle to operate in Hawaii.

== History ==
The Olomana arrived in the Kingdom of Hawaii in August 1883, after a two-month journey sailing around Cape Horn. It was owned by the Waimanalo Sugar Company on the island of Oahu, and hauled sugar cane from the fields to the refinery. The Olomana was operated by a lone engineer and ran at an average speed of 5 miles per hour (8.0 km/h) on sets of prefabricated, 3 ft (914 mm) gauge railroad tracks that could be taken apart and reassembled at a different location. Originally burning coal, the Olomana was converted to run on oil in 1928. Dried cane was tried, but it left hard-to-remove residue inside the engine. The Olomana and two similar locomotives were replaced by trucks and retired in 1944.

The locomotive was bought by Gerald M. Best in 1948, who shipped it back to the continental United States. The Olomana was stored at a Hollywood backlot until 1951, when Best moved it onto property owned by Ward Kimball, who owned a small, working railroad in his backyard, called the Grizzly Flats Railroad. Best and Kimball restored the Olomana from 1952 to 1953. It was also converted from oil-burning to wood. Walt Disney, who was often invited to visit Kimball and occasionally ran the locomotive, remarked that the Olomana was "the nearest thing to a Mickey Mouse engine he had ever seen." Best donated the Olomana to the Smithsonian in the National Museum of American History in 1977. The locomotive was moved on January 23, 1999, from the American History museum to the Arts and Industries Building. The Olomana was moved, again, later the same year to the Railroad Museum of Pennsylvania in Strasburg, Pennsylvania.
