= John Bull (locomotive) =

British-built railroad steam locomotive

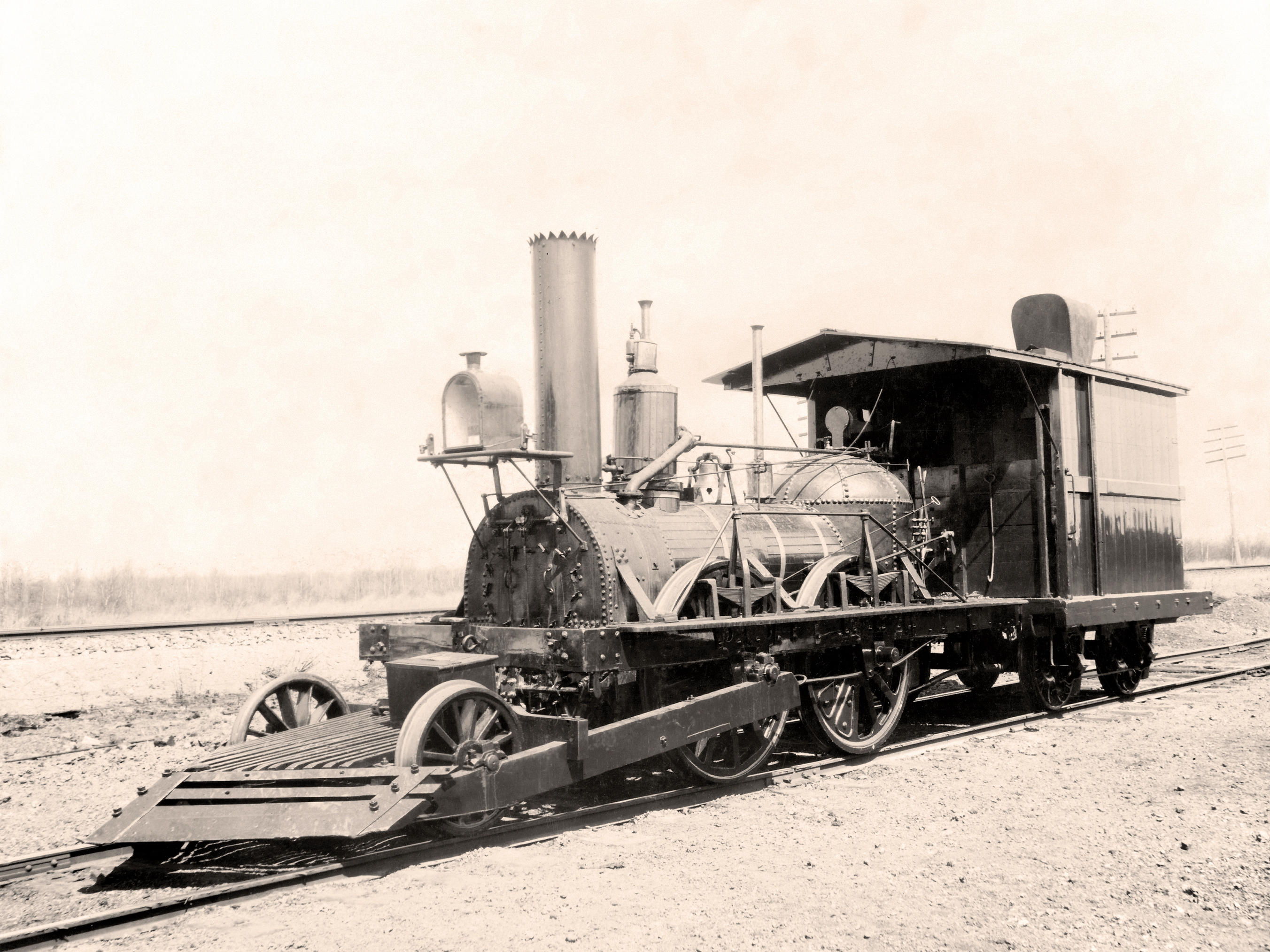
- John Bull, c. 1895
Type and origin
- Power type: Steam
- Builder: Robert Stephenson and Company
- Build date: 1831; 195 years ago
Specifications
- Configuration
  - Whyte: 4-2-0 (built by Stephenson as an 0-4-0 and often mistaken as a 2-4-0 because the second leading wheel is the same size as the driving wheel)
  - UIC: 1'1A (built as B and often mistaken as a 1'B because the second leading wheel is the same size as the driving wheel)
- Gauge: 4 ft 8 1/2 in (1,435 mm) standard gauge
- Driver dia.: 4 ft 6 in (1,372 mm)
- Wheelbase: 4 ft 11 in (1,499 mm) between driving axles
- Length: 14 ft 9 in (4,496 mm) — frame
- Width: 6 ft 3 in (1,905 mm) — frame
- Loco weight: 10 short tons (8.9 long tons; 9.1 t)
- Firebox
  - Grate area: 10.07 square feet (0.936 m^{2})
- Boiler: 2 ft 6 in (762 mm) diameter × 6 ft 9 in (2,057 mm) length
- Heating surface: 213 sq ft (19.8 m^{2})
- Cylinder size: 9 in (229 mm) diameter × 20 in (508 mm) stroke
Career
- Operators: Camden and Amboy Railroad, Pennsylvania Railroad (initial preservation)
- Numbers: 1
- Official name: Stevens (after C&A president Robert L. Stevens)
- Delivered: September 4, 1831
- First run: September 15, 1831
- Retired: 1866
- Restored: September 15, 1981
- Current owner: Smithsonian Institution
- Disposition: Preserved; on static display at the National Museum of American History, Washington, D.C.

John Bull is a historic British-built steam locomotive that operated in the United States. It was operated for the first time on September 15, 1831, and became the oldest operable steam locomotive in the world when the Smithsonian Institution ran it under its own steam in 1981. Built by Robert Stephenson and Company, it was initially purchased by and operated for the Camden and Amboy Railroad, the first railroad in New Jersey, which gave it the number 1 and its first name, "Stevens". (Robert L. Stevens was president of the Camden and Amboy Railroad at the time.) The C&A used it heavily from 1833 until 1866, when it was removed from active service and placed in storage.

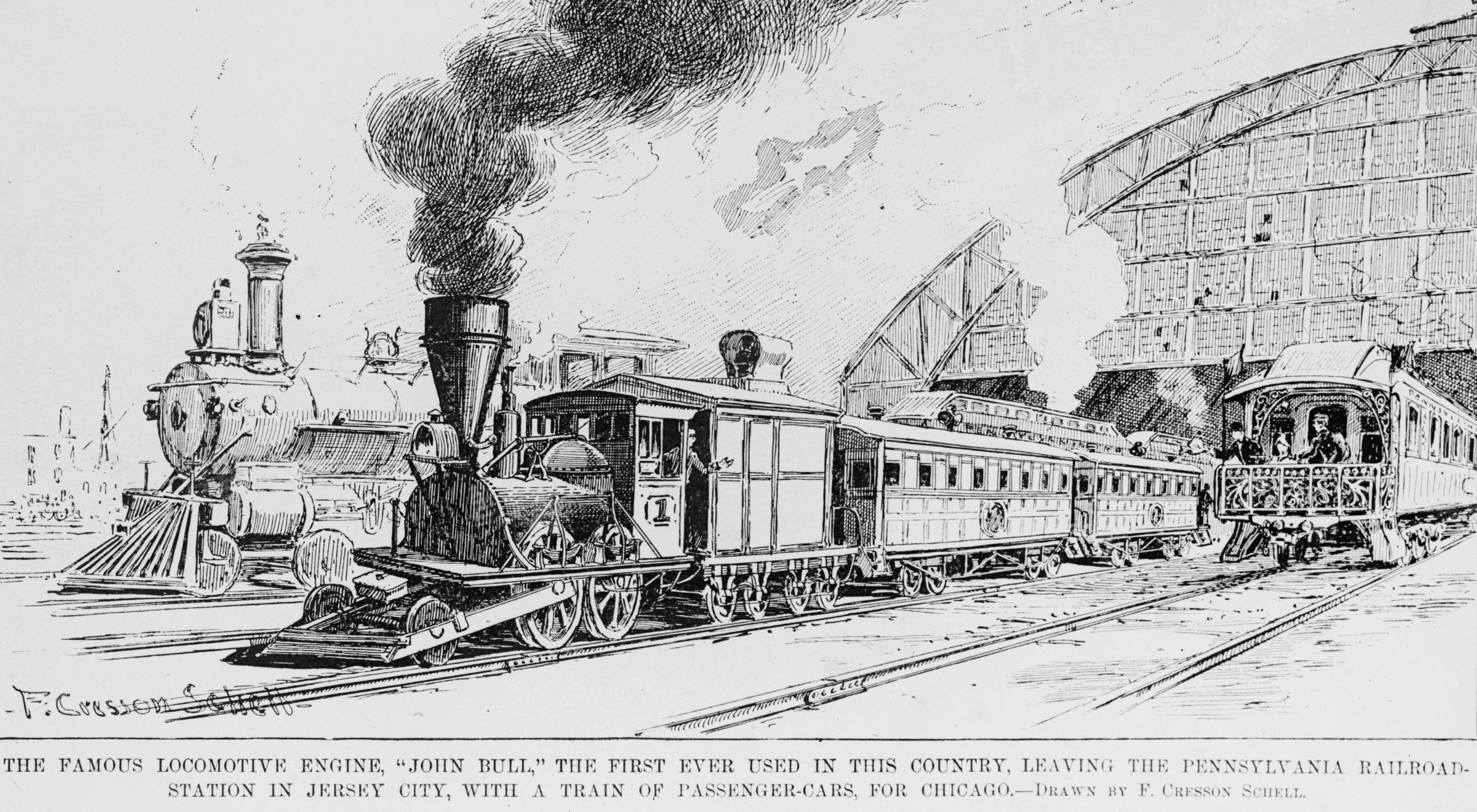
A 1925 drawing of the "John Bull" departing for Chicago from the Jersey City, NJ, Pennsylvania Railroad station, with the erroneous claim it was the first locomotive to operate in the United States. By F. Cresson Schell

After the C&A's assets were acquired by the Pennsylvania Railroad (PRR) in 1871, the PRR refurbished and operated the locomotive a few times for public displays: it was fired up for the Centennial Exposition in 1876 and again for the National Railway Appliance Exhibition in 1883. In 1884 it was purchased by the Smithsonian Institution as the museum's first major industrial exhibit.

In 1939 the employees of the PRR's Altoona, Pennsylvania, workshops built an operable replica of the locomotive for further exhibition duties, as the Smithsonian wanted to keep the original locomotive in a more controlled environment. After being on static display for 42 years, the Smithsonian commemorated the locomotive's 150th birthday in 1981 by firing it up; it was then the world's oldest surviving operable steam locomotive.

As of 2026, the original John Bull is on static display in the Smithsonian's National Museum of American History in Washington, D.C., and the replica is preserved at the Railroad Museum of Pennsylvania in Strasburg, Pennsylvania.

== Construction and initial use ==
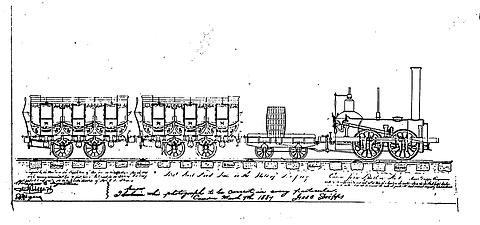
The John Bull and train as it looked in 1831; drawn by Isaac Dripps in 1887

The John Bull was built in Newcastle, England, by Robert Stephenson and Company for the Camden and Amboy Railroad (C&A), the first railroad built in New Jersey. It was dismantled and then shipped across the Atlantic Ocean in crates aboard the Allegheny. C&A engineer Isaac Dripps reconstructed the locomotive to the best of his ability (the shipment did not include any drawings or instructions to assemble the locomotive) and ran it for the first time in September 1831. On November 12, 1831, Robert Stevens (then president of the C&A) repaid some political debts by inviting several members of the New Jersey legislature and some local dignitaries, including Napoleon's nephew Prince Murat, for rides behind the newly delivered locomotive over a short test track. The prince's wife, Catherine Willis Gray, made a point of hurrying onto the train so she could be declared the first woman to ride a steam-powered train in America, though unknown to her, men and women had already ridden behind the steam powered maiden runs on the Baltimore and Ohio, South Carolina Railroad, and the Mohawk and Hudson by this point in 1831.

Until the railroad was completed, the locomotive was placed in storage; horse-drawn cars served the construction efforts until 1833. The C&A applied both numbers and names to their first locomotives, giving this engine the number 1 and officially naming it Stevens after Robert L. Stevens. However, through regular use of the engine, crews began calling it the old John Bull, a reference to the cartoon personification of England, John Bull. Eventually the informal name was shortened to John Bull and this name was so much more widely used that Stevens fell out of use.

In September 1836 the John Bull and two coaches were shipped by canal to Harrisburg, and became the first locomotive to operate there.

== Mechanical modifications and early exhibitions ==
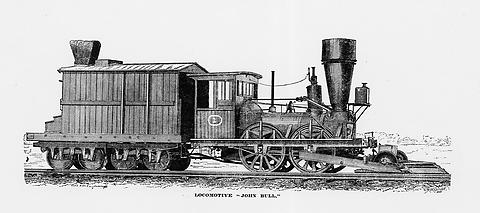
The John Bull as it appeared in 1877, with a cab, leading truck, cowcatcher and wider funnel

Due to poorer quality track than was the norm in its native England, the locomotive tended to derail, so the C&A's engineers added a leading truck to help guide the engine into curves. The leading truck's mechanism necessitated the removal of the coupling rod between the two main axles, leaving only the rear axle powered. Effectively, with a single set of powered driving wheels, the John Bull became a 4-2-0. Later, the C&A also added a cowcatcher ("pilot") to the lead truck. The cowcatcher is an angled assembly designed to deflect animals and debris off of the track in front of the locomotive. To protect the locomotive's crew from the weather, the C&A added a cab to the locomotive, and C&A workshop crews added safety features such as a bell and headlight.

After several years serving as a switching engine and stationary boiler, the John Bull was retired in 1866 and stored in Bordentown, New Jersey. Toward the end of its life in revenue service, the locomotive worked as a pump engine and as the power for a sawmill.

The C&A was soon absorbed into the United New Jersey Railroad and Canal Company (1869), which, in turn, was merged into the Pennsylvania Railroad (PRR) in 1871. The PRR saw the potential publicity to be gained by exhibiting such an old engine, showing it at the 1876 Centennial Exposition in Philadelphia; PRR workshop staff then retrofitted the engine to look more as it originally had. The wide funnel was replaced with a straight metal tube and the cab walls and roof were removed. The PRR then exhibited the engine in 1883 at the National Railway Appliance Exhibition in Chicago, Illinois. In 1885, the Smithsonian Institution accepted the donation of the John Bull from the PRR as the Institution's first large engineering artifact.

== Smithsonian Institution and locomotive restoration ==
At the exhibition in 1883, the Pennsylvania Railroad ended up resolving two problems at once. In the Smithsonian Institution, the railroad was able to find a home for the historic locomotive, as well as a suitable new employer for a young civil engineer named J. Elfreth Watkins. Watkins had been involved in an accident on the railroad in New Jersey a few years before the exhibition. He had lost a leg in the accident, so he was no longer suited to the physical demands of railroad work, although the railroad did employ him as a clerk for a while after his accident. The PRR employed his engineering experience as an expert curator for the Smithsonian's new Arts and Industries Building, which was opened in 1880. The locomotive's first public exhibition at the Smithsonian occurred on December 22, 1884, where it was displayed in the East Hall of the Arts and Industries building.

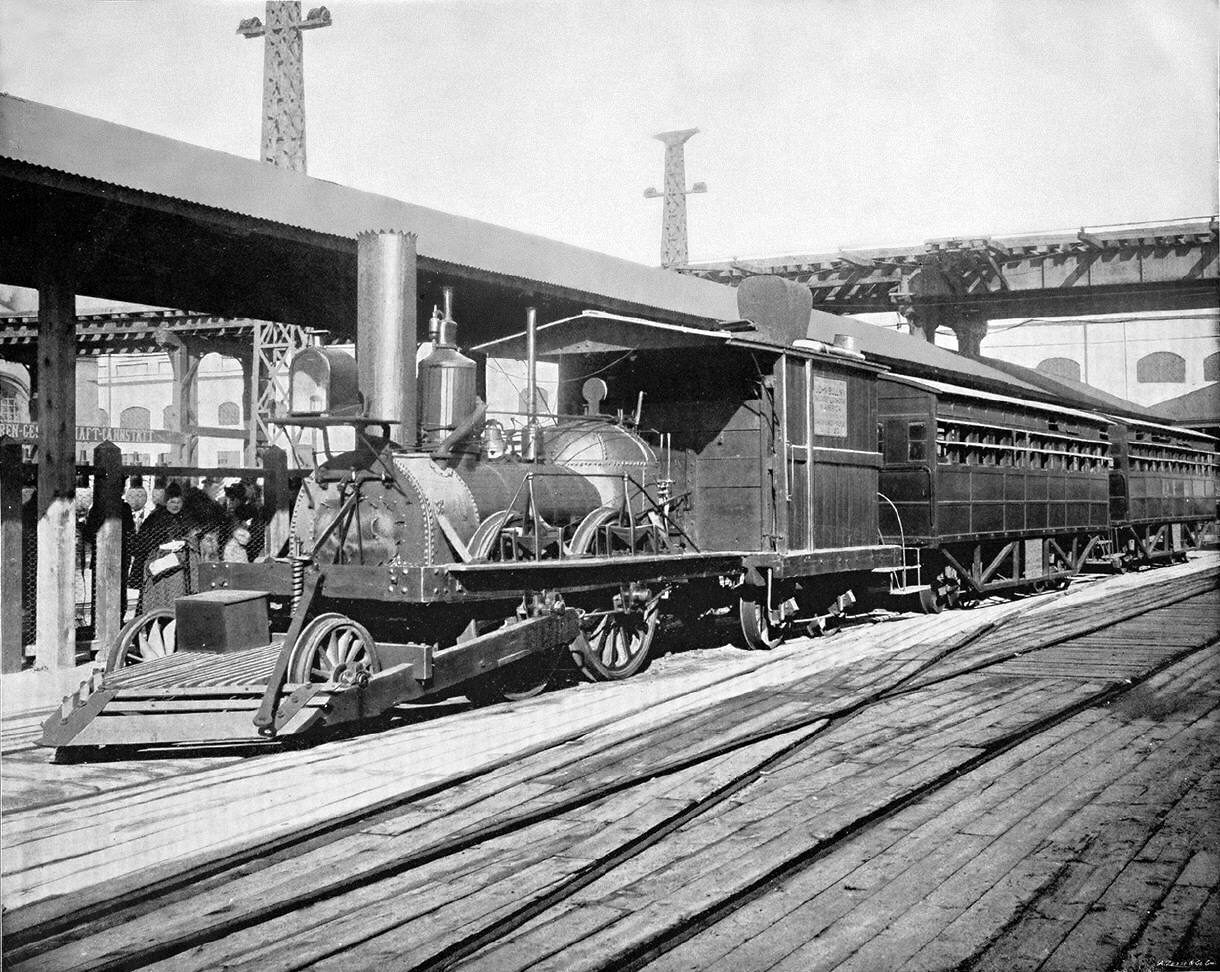
John Bull at the World's Columbian Exposition in 1893

The locomotive remained on display in this location for nearly 80 years, but it was transported for display outside the museum on certain rare occasions. The most significant display in this time occurred in 1893 when the locomotive traveled to Chicago for the World's Columbian Exposition. The Pennsylvania Railroad, like many other railroads of the time, put on grand displays of their progress; the PRR arranged for the locomotive and a couple of coaches to be delivered to the railroad's Jersey City, New Jersey, workshops where it would undergo a partial restoration to operating condition. The PRR was planning an event worthy of the locomotive's significance to American railroad history, actually operating the John Bull for the entire distance between New Jersey and Chicago.

The restoration was supervised by the PRR's chief mechanical officer, Theodore N. Ely. Ely was confident enough in its 50-mile (80.5 km) test run to Perth Amboy, New Jersey (which took two hours and fifteen minutes), that the governors of all the states that the locomotive was to pass through and the then President of the United States, Grover Cleveland, were invited to ride in passenger cars carrying dignitaries and representatives of the press on its first leg toward Chicago. The train traveled to Philadelphia, Pennsylvania, in the charge of one locomotive crew. From Philadelphia, local engineers (train drivers) were employed to ride on the locomotive's footplate as pilots to advise the operators for the trip over the local engineers' territories for the rest of the journey to Chicago. Traveling at 25 to 30 miles per hour (40 to 48 km/h), the train departed from the Pennsylvania Railroad's Jersey City station at 10:16 a.m. on April 17 and reached Chicago on April 22. The locomotive operated during the exhibition giving rides to the exhibition's attendees, and then the train left Chicago on December 6 for the return trip to Washington. The locomotive arrived back in Washington on December 13.

In 1927 the John Bull again traveled outside the museum. The Baltimore and Ohio Railroad was celebrating its centenary that year in its Fair of the Iron Horse in Baltimore, Maryland. Since the locomotive's original tender (fuel and water car) had deteriorated beyond repair and was dismantled in 1910, the PRR built a replica of the tender at its Altoona, Pennsylvania, workshops. The locomotive was also refurbished in Altoona for operation during the fair. This fair was the last steam up for the locomotive until 1980.

== (Mostly) static display ==
After the locomotive returned to the Smithsonian, it remained on static display. In 1930 the museum commissioned the Altoona Works to build a second replica of the locomotive's tender for display with the locomotive in the museum. This replica tender integrated some of the fittings of the original that the museum had retained when it had been dismantled twenty years earlier.

The Smithsonian recognized the locomotive's age in 1931, but, since the museum did not have the funds to refurbish the locomotive for full operation again, it was decided to run the locomotive in place (with the driving wheels lifted off the rails using jacks) with compressed air. The museum borrowed an 1836 coach from the Pennsylvania Railroad to display on the track behind the newly rebuilt tender, and the locomotive's 100th birthday was officially celebrated on November 12, 1931. The locomotive's semi-operation was broadcast over the CBS radio network with Stanley Bell narrating the ceremonies for the radio audience.

The PRR again borrowed the locomotive and rebuilt tender from 1933 to 1934 for the Century of Progress exhibition in Chicago. Unlike its earlier round-trip to Chicago under its own steam, the engine was hauled and displayed as a static exhibit. During the exhibit the Altoona Works built a operable replica, which was operated in 1940 at the New York World's Fair, while the original locomotive returned to the Smithsonian.

The John Bull was displayed outside the museum one more time in 1939 at the New York World's Fair, but the museum's curators decided that the locomotive was becoming too fragile for repeated outside exhibits. It was then placed in somewhat permanent display back in the East Hall where it remained for the next 25 years. In 1964 the locomotive was moved to its current home, the National Museum of American History, then called the Museum of History and Technology.

== 1981 excursion ==
The original locomotive under steam in 1981

The John Bull had remained on static display for another 15 years, but the locomotive's significance as one of the oldest in existence, or its use on the first railroad in New Jersey, was not very plainly noted in the display's literature. As 1981 and the locomotive's 150th birthday approached, the Smithsonian started discussions on how best to commemorate the John Bull's age and significance. There was very little question that special publications and exhibits would be prepared, but museum officials were left with the thought that the exhibit could still be so much more than that.

Many superficial inspections were performed on the locomotive in 1980 and it was found to be in relatively sound mechanical condition. No significant amount of deterioration was noted in these early inspections, and when the wheels were jacked off the rails, as they had been 50 years earlier, the axles were found to be freely operable. One morning in January 1980, before the museum opened to the public, museum officials used compressed air to power the cylinders and move the wheels through the connecting rods for the first time since its last semi-operation. After the compressed air blew some dirt and debris out of the locomotive's exhaust stack, it was soon running smoothly.

The running gear seemed to be in good order, but it was still not known whether the boiler could still handle the pressure of steam and a live fire again. The museum asked the Hartford Steam Boiler Inspection and Insurance Company to inspect the locomotive's boiler for operation. The inspections were conducted after hours at the museum (from 6:30 p.m. to 4:00 a.m.) over three days and included electromagnetic, ultrasonic, and radiographic tests. The tests did reveal a few flaws, but it was projected that the engine could operate at a reduced boiler pressure of 50 pounds per square inch (340 kPa); as delivered to the Camden & Amboy, the boiler was rated for 70 psi (480 kPa). The Smithsonian's staff, after a few further hydrostatic tests, were confident that the locomotive could again operate under its own power. The items that needed repair were serviced, and on October 14, 1980, the locomotive was successfully field-tested on the Warrenton Branch Line in Fauquier County between Calverton and Casanova, Virginia. The site was selected because at the time only one freight train per week used the branch line. On September 15, 1981, the locomotive operated under steam on a few miles of branch line near the Potomac River within Washington, D.C. With this exhibition, the locomotive became the oldest operable steam locomotive (and oldest self-propelled vehicle) in the world.

As of 2021, the original John Bull was on static display in the Smithsonian's National Museum of American History and the replica was preserved at the Railroad Museum of Pennsylvania.

== Timeline ==
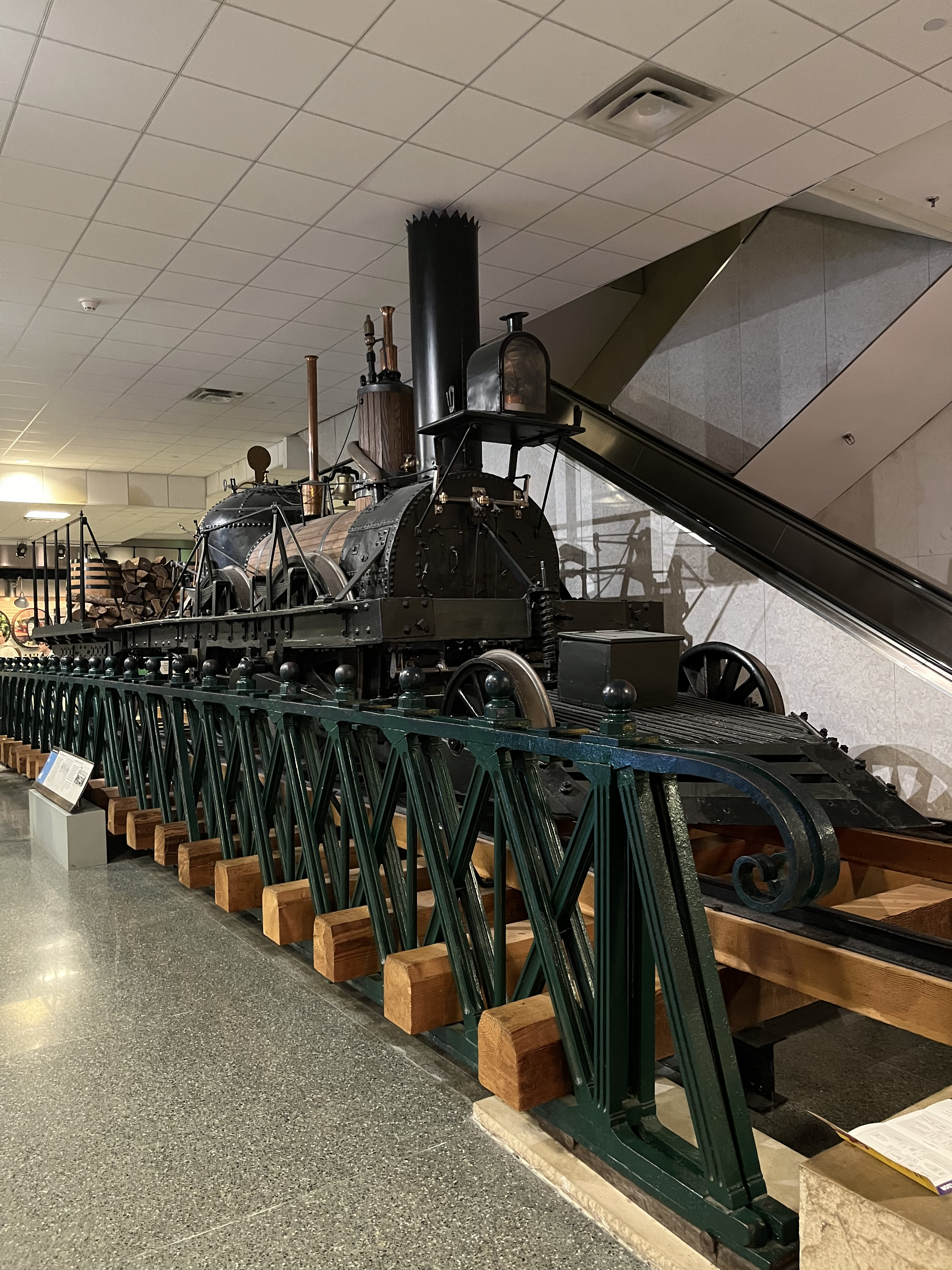
John Bull locomotive at the National Museum of American History

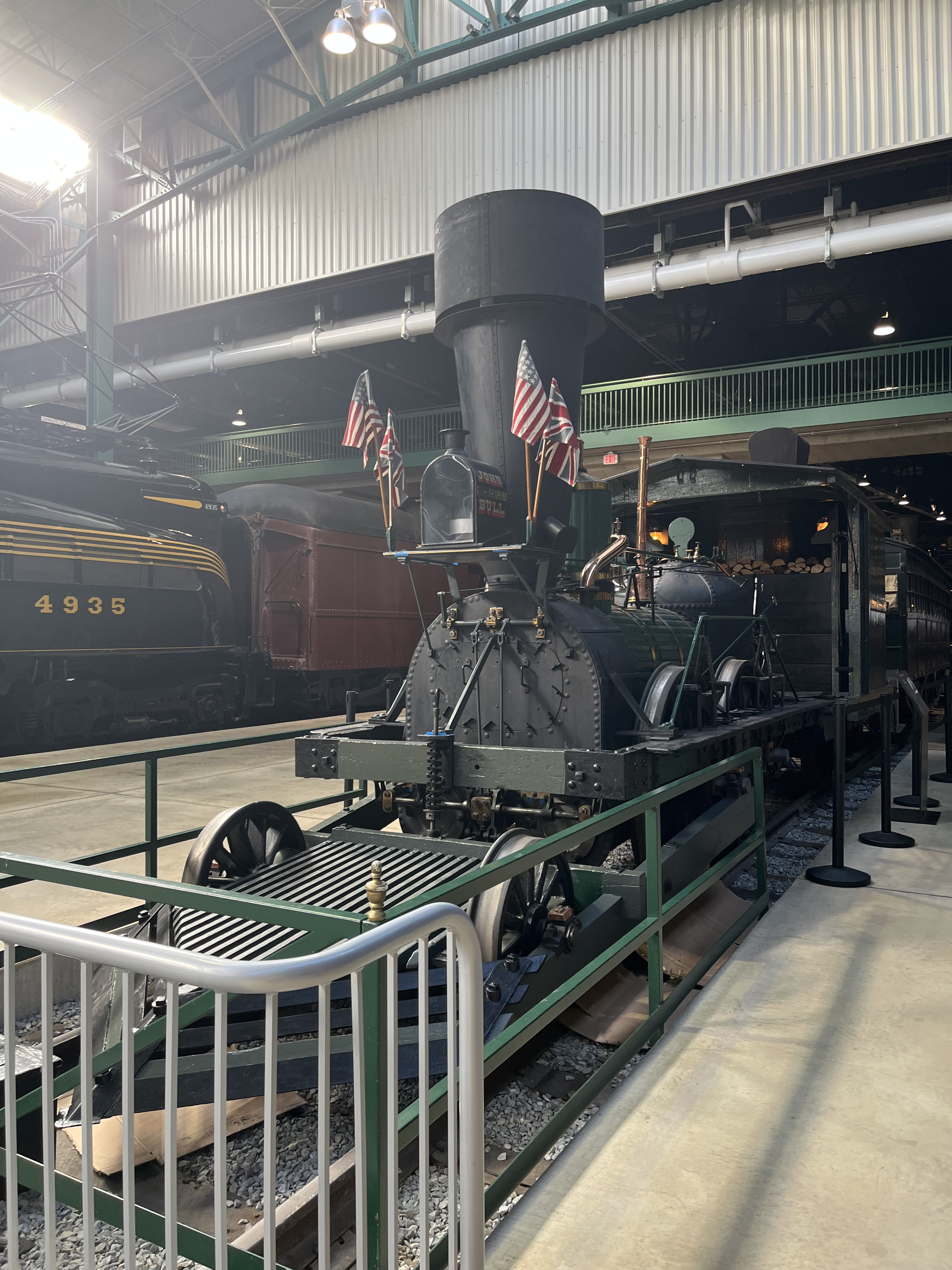
John Bull replica in Pennsylvania

- June 18, 1831: The John Bull is built by Stephenson and Company in Britain.
- July 14, 1831: The John Bull departs Liverpool aboard the ship Allegheny bound for Philadelphia, Pennsylvania.
- September 1831: The John Bull makes its first runs in New Jersey under its own power.
- November 12, 1831: Robert Stevens hosts a group of New Jersey politicians on a series of trial runs pulled by the John Bull.
- 1836: The John Bull is shipped to Harrisburg, Pennsylvania.
- 1866: The John Bull is retired from regular service.
- 1876: The John Bull is displayed at the United States Centennial Exposition in Philadelphia.
- 1883: The Pennsylvania Railroad displays John Bull at the National Railway Appliance Exhibition in Chicago, Illinois.
- 1884: The Smithsonian Institution acquires the John Bull from the Pennsylvania Railroad.
- 1893: The John Bull operates at the World's Columbian Exposition in Chicago.
- 1910: The original tender, now deteriorated beyond repair, is dismantled.
- 1927: The Baltimore and Ohio Railroad borrows the John Bull to operate at the Fair of the Iron Horse in Baltimore, Maryland.
- 1930: A replica tender is commissioned by the Smithsonian and built by the Pennsylvania Railroad using the fittings previously salvaged from the original tender; the new tender is displayed with the locomotive at the museum.
- November 12, 1931: The Smithsonian celebrates the locomotive's 100th "birthday," using compressed air to operate the stationary engine (stabilized on jacks) within the museum's exhibit hall.
- 1933–1934: The Pennsylvania Railroad borrows the John Bull to display it at the Century of Progress Exhibition in Chicago.
- 1939: The original John Bull is displayed in the opening of the New York World's Fair.
- 1940: A replica of the John Bull, built by engineers at the Pennsylvania Railroad's Juniata Shops in Altoona, Pennsylvania, is displayed at the New York World's Fair, and the original is returned to the Smithsonian.
- October 14, 1980: The John Bull is restored to operating condition, and tested on the Warrenton Branch Line in Fauquier County, Virginia.
- September 15, 1981: The John Bull operates in Washington, D.C., on the 150th anniversary of its first use, becoming the oldest operable steam locomotive (and oldest self-propelled vehicle) in the world.
- 1985: The John Bull is carried aboard an airplane for an exhibition in Dallas, Texas, making it the oldest locomotive in the world to travel by air.

== See also ==
- LMR 57 Lion
- Stourbridge Lion
- Tom Thumb
