= Altoona Works =

Railroad complex in Altoona, Pennsylvania, U.S.

Altoona Works (Pennsylvania Railroad Shops)
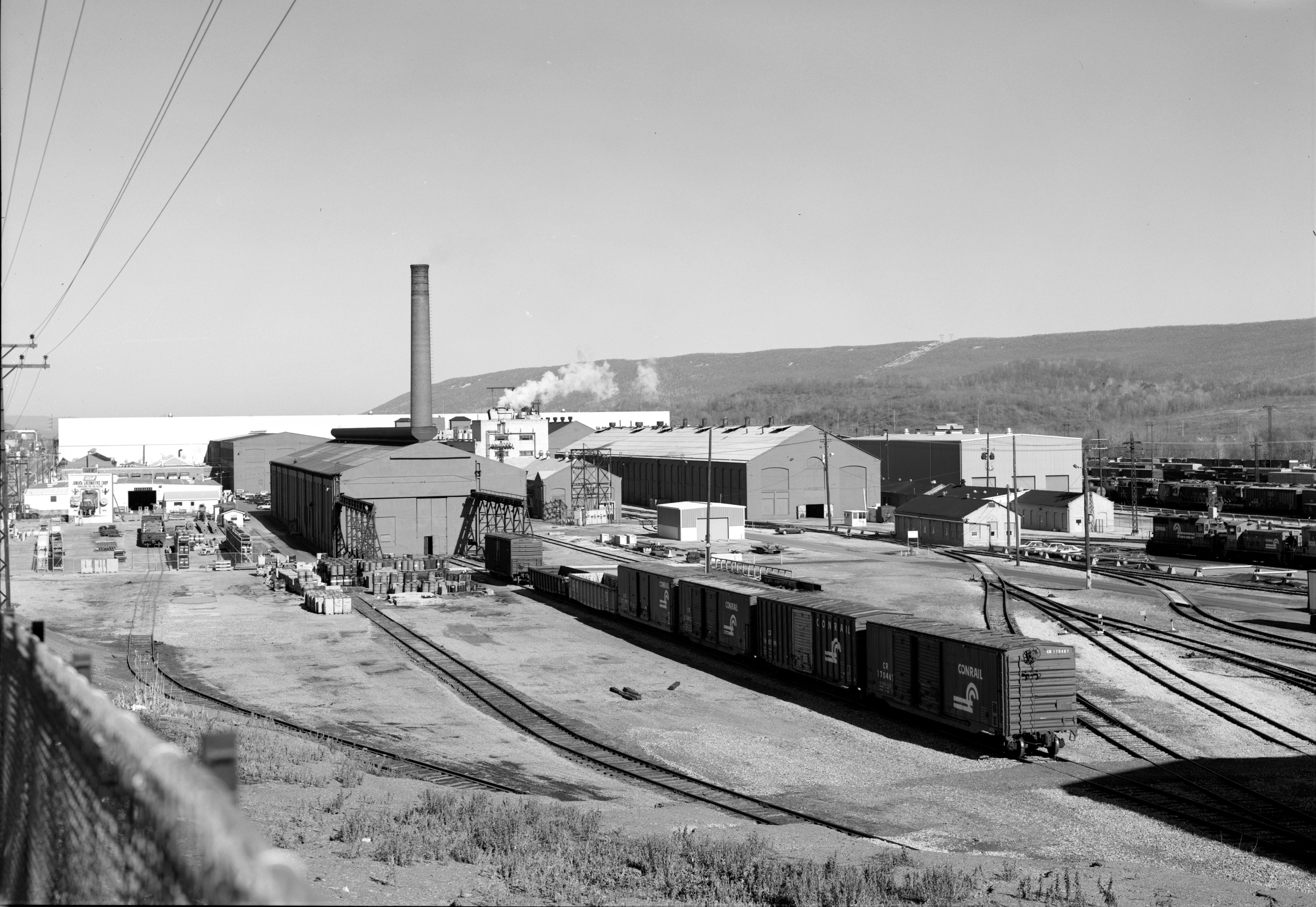
- Juniata Locomotive Shop at Altoona Works in 1988, during the Conrail era

- Location within Pennsylvania Location within the United States
- 40.51321°N 78.39985°W
- Location: 9th Ave. at 13th St., Altoona, Pennsylvania

History
- Built: 1850–1925

Site notes
- Governing body: Norfolk Southern Railway

Altoona Works (also known as Altoona Terminal) is a large railroad industrial complex in Altoona, Pennsylvania, United States. It was built between 1850 and 1925 by the Pennsylvania Railroad (PRR), to supply the railroad with locomotives, railroad cars and related equipment. For many years, it was the largest railroad shop complex in the world.

== History ==
In 1849, PRR officials developed plans to construct a repair facility at a town newly established for this purpose, Altoona. Construction was started in 1850, and soon a long building was completed in the 12th Street area that housed a machine shop, woodworking shop, blacksmith shop, locomotive repair shop and foundry.

The 12th Street area facilities were replaced later by the Altoona Machine Shops. The first locomotive was built there in 1866. A total of 6,783 steam, diesel and electric locomotives were manufactured in Altoona between 1866 and 1946.

In time, additional PRR repair facilities were located in Harrisburg, Pittsburgh, Renovo and Mifflin, and the Altoona Works expanded in adjacent Juniata. Inventor Alexander Graham Bell sent two assistants to the Altoona shops in 1875 to study the feasibility of installing telephone lines.

In 1875, the Altoona Works started a testing department for PRR equipment. In following years, the Pennsylvania Railroad led the nation in the development of research and testing procedures of practical value for the railroad industry. In 1905, a Stationary Testing Plant was installed at Altoona, after originally being installed and used for locomotive testing in 1904, as one of the PRR System exhibits at the Louisiana Purchase Exposition in St. Louis. Locomotives tested on the plant included T1 4-4-4-4 No.6110 and Baldwin No. 60,000 Use of the testing facilities was discontinued in 1968, and many of the structures were demolished.

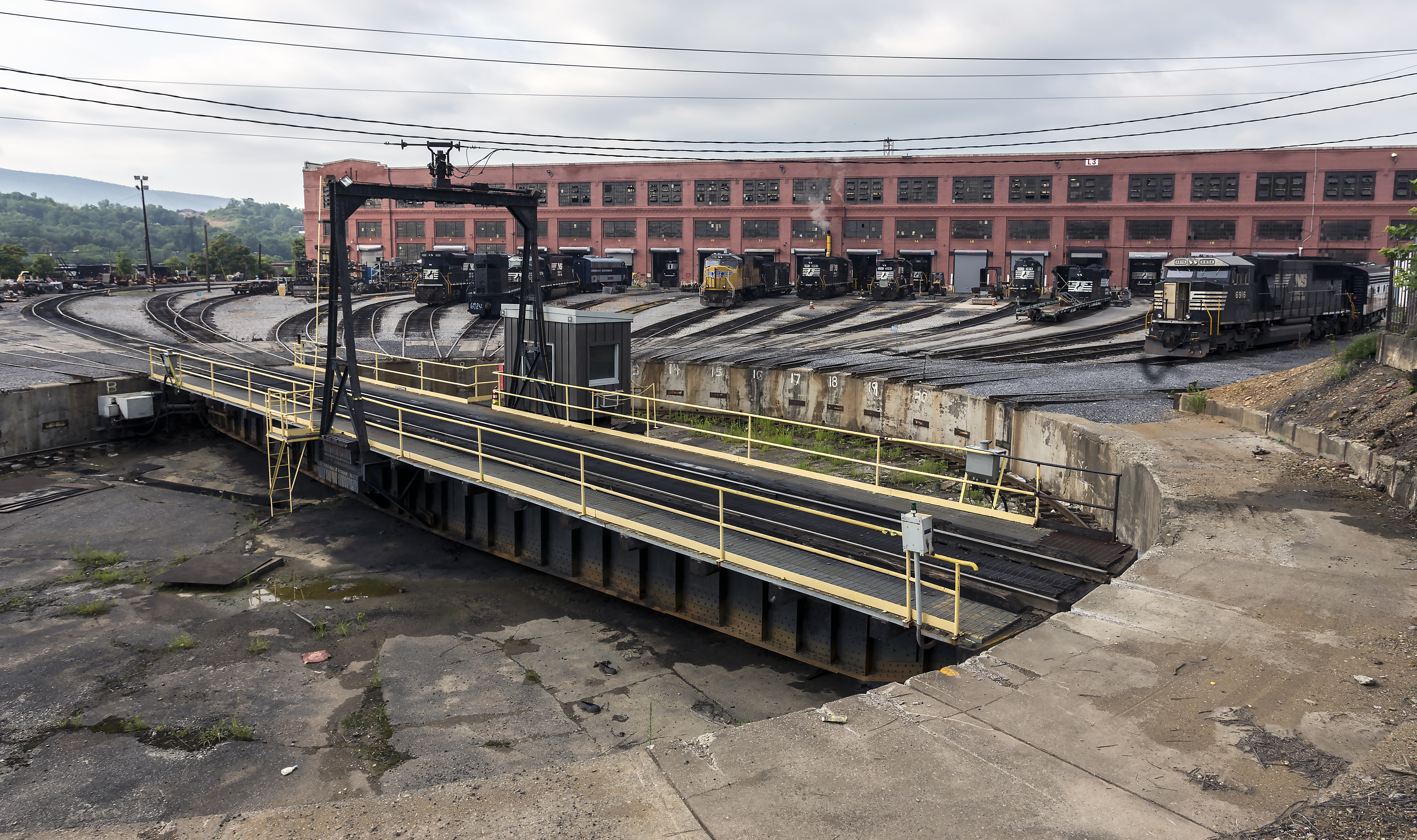
The turntable at the Altoona Works in 2014

In May 1877, telephone lines were installed for various departments to communicate with one another.

In the 1920s, the site consisted of 125 buildings on 218 acres (0.88 km^{2}), and the shops employed over 16,000 workers. Portions of the complex are still in use by Norfolk Southern Railway (NS).

During World War II, PRR facilities (including the Altoona Shops) were on target lists of German saboteurs involved in Operation Pastorius. They were caught before they could complete their missions. By 1945, the Altoona Works had grown to be one of the largest repair and construction facilities for locomotives and cars in the world.

== Current facilities ==
In 2019, the shops employed nearly 700 employees. After a series of layoffs between 2019 and 2021, NS reduced the staff at the Juniata locomotive shop to about 450 employees.

The mass layoffs began on November 7, 2019 (95 employees) again in May 2019 (50 employees) and another round in July 2021 (86 employees) reduced the workforce in Altoona by nearly 36% as part of Norfolk Southern's new long-term business plan.

The Railroaders Memorial Museum is located next to the Juniata Shops on the site of the Altoona Machine Shops.

== Major facilities (1920s) ==
- Altoona Machine Shops (renamed 12th St Car Shop in 1928)
  - Built steam locomotives during 1866–1904
  - Later in the 20th century it handled locomotive repair and manufacture of engine parts
- Altoona Car Shops
  - Built 1869
  - Manufactured freight cars and passenger cars
- Juniata Locomotive Shop

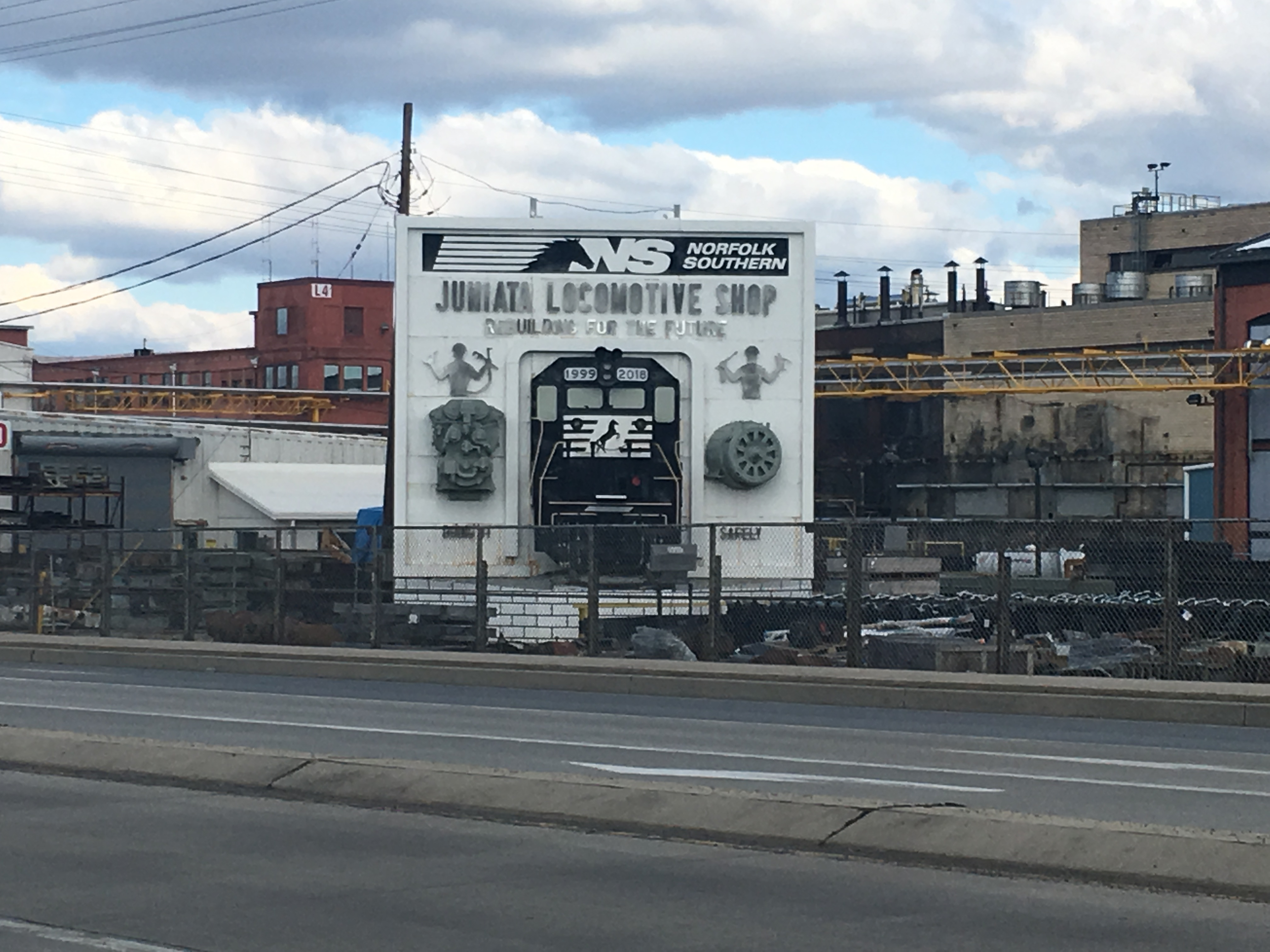
Modern Juniata Locomotive Shop sign viewed from Chestnut Avenue

  - Built 1888–1890; expanded 1924–25
  - Built steam and electric locomotives during 1891–1946
  - Included a paint shop, boiler shop, blacksmith shop, boiler house, erecting shop, two-story machine shop, electric and hydraulic house, two-story office and storeroom, paint storehouse and gas house, and hydraulic transfer table and pit.
  - Repair work only in the mid-20th century
  - Builds and remanufactures locomotives today
- South Altoona Foundries
  - Manufactured cast iron and brass castings

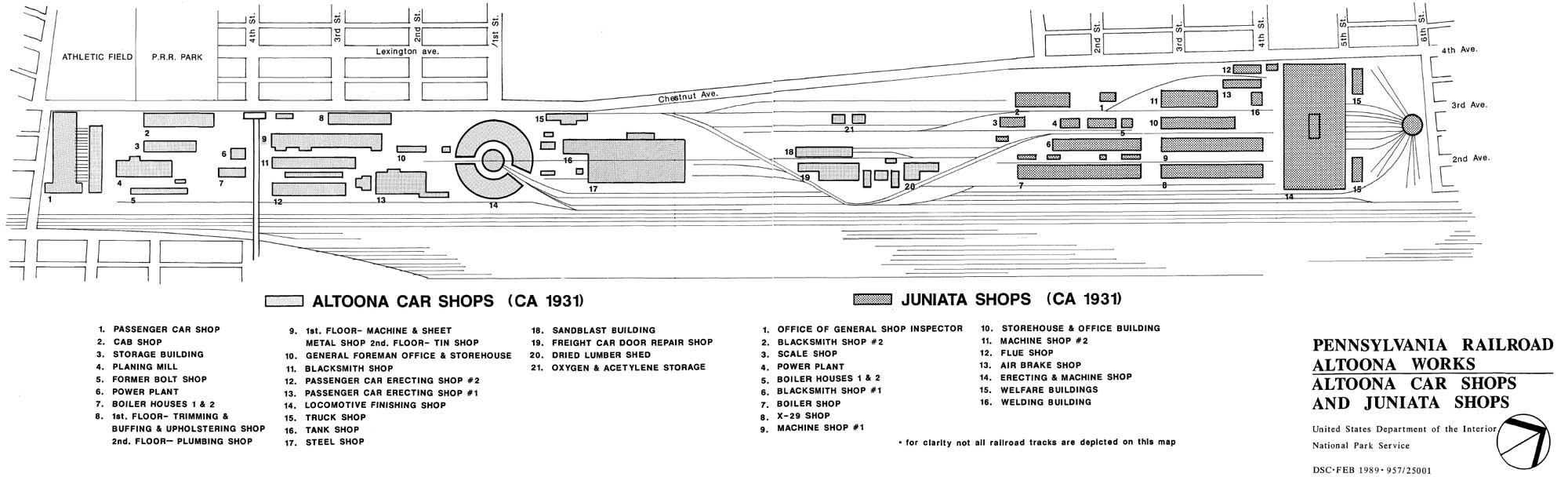
Altoona Works, c. 1931

== See also ==
- List of locomotive builders
