= Soo Line locomotives =

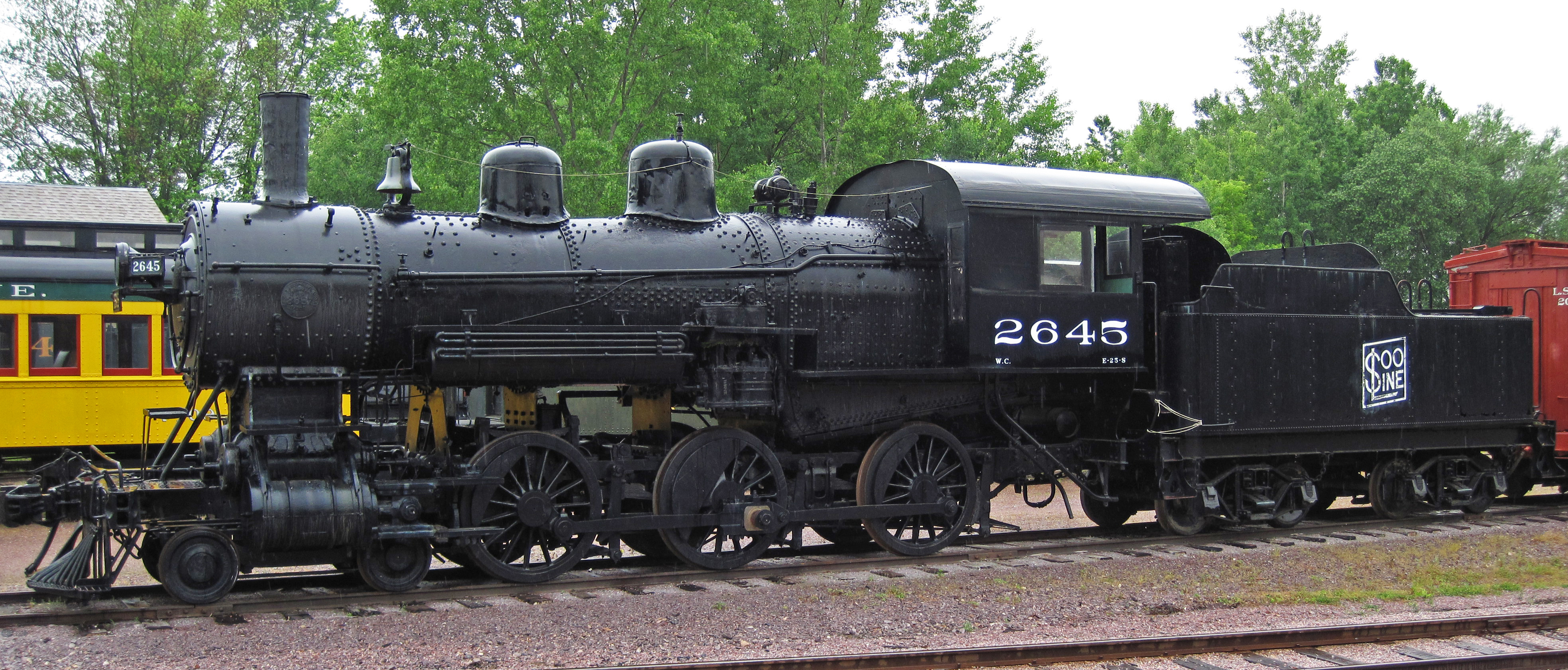
Soo Line 2645 steam locomotive (E-25 4-6-0) at the Mid-Continent Railway Museum in North Freedom, Wisconsin

Included in this list of Soo Line locomotives are those of the Minneapolis, St. Paul and Sault Ste. Marie Railroad, as well as those of the Wisconsin Central Railway, which it inherited on its lease in 1909. The M.St.P.&S.Ste.M. finally merged the WC and the Duluth, South Shore and Atlantic Railway on December 30, 1961 to form the Soo Line Railroad. The Soo Line later acquired the Milwaukee Road and became part of the Canadian Pacific Railway.

Note that WC locomotives are shown as after they were re-numbered and reclassified into the Soo Line scheme, with WC locomotives having numbers 2000 higher and classes 20 higher than their M.St.P.&S.Ste.M. counterparts.

Steam	Class A (0–4–0), B (0–6–0), C (4–4–0), D (2–6–0), E (4–6–0), F (2–8–0), G (2–10–0), H (4–6–2), J (2–6–2), K (4–4–2), L (2–8–2), N (4–8–2), O (4–8–4)
Diesel	ALCO, Baldwin, EMD (Switchers, Cab units, Hood units), Fairbanks-Morse, General Electric

== Steam locomotives ==
Soo Line steam locomotives were organized into classes by wheel arrangement.

=== Class A: 0-4-0 ===
Class A was for the 0-4-0 switcher type.

Image	Class	Wheel arrangement	Fleet number(s)	Manufacturer	Year made	Quantity made	Quantity preserved	Year(s) retired	Comments
0-4-0 — OO
	A	0-4-0	320	Rhode Island	1887	1	0	1919	Built as an 0-4-6T Forney
	A-20	0-4-0	2300–2301	Schenectady	1883	2	0	1921-1922	
	A-21	0-4-0	2302–2307	Baldwin	1887	6	0	1923-1930	

=== Class B: 0-6-0 ===
Class B was for the 0-6-0 switcher type.

Image	Class	Wheel arrangement	Fleet number(s)	Manufacturer	Year made	Quantity made	Quantity preserved	Year(s) retired	Comments
0-6-0 — OOO
	B	0-6-0	321	Rhode Island	1887	1	1	1925	Rebuilt as an 0-6-0T, numbered X90 for use as a shop switcher. Preserved, rebuilt back to tender locomotive
	B	0-6-0	323, 325	Rhode Island	1892	2	0	1935	
	B-1	0-6-0	326–333	Alco-Cooke	1902–1907	8	0	1940-1948	
	B-2	0-6-0	334–339	Alco-Schenectady	1909–1910	6	0	1920-1947	
	B-3	0-6-0	340–343	Alco-Schenectady	1912	4	0	1935-1949	
	B-4	0-6-0	344–349	Alco-Schenectady	1915	6	1	1950	346 preserved
	B-4	0-6-0	350–354	Alco-Brooks	1920	5	1	1951	353 preserved
	B-20	0-6-0	2308–2313	Schenectady	1886	6	0	1910-1940	
	B-21	0-6-0	2314–2316	Brooks	1892	3	0	1940-1943	
	B-22	0-6-0	2317–2320	Brooks	1900	4	0	1940-1945	
	B-23	0-6-0	2321–2328	Brooks & Alco-Brooks	1899–1909	8	0	1945-1950	

=== Class C: 4-4-0 ===
Class C was for the 4-4-0 "American" type.

Image	Class	Wheel arrangement	Fleet number(s)	Manufacturer	Year made	Quantity made	Quantity preserved	Year(s) retired	Comments
4-4-0 — ooOO — American
	C	4-4-0	300–305	Baldwin	1886–1887	6	0	1929-1930	
	C-1	4-4-0	315	New Jersey	1857	1	0	1897	Ex DSS&A No. 21, acquired 1892
	C-1	4-4-0	316	New Jersey	1862	1	0	1895	Ex DSS&A No. 22, acquired 1892
	V	4-4-0	317	New Jersey	1855	1	0	1895	Ex DSS&A No. 20, acquired 1892
	C-3	4-4-0	1–2	Rhode Island	1884	2	0	1919	ex MSSteM&A
	C-4/C-5	4-4-0	3–46	Baldwin	1886–1887	44	0	1901-1944	
	C-5-s	4-4-0		MStP&SSteM (rebuilder)	1928–1931 (rebuilt)	9	0	1910-1919	C-4/C-5 locomotives modernized
	C-20	4-4-0	2000–2001	Schenectady	1882	2	0	1922	
	C-21	4-4-0	2002–2005, 2008–2015	Schenectady	1885	12	0	1920-1932	
	C-22	4-4-0	2017–2027	Schenectady	1886	11	0	1947-1949	
	C-23	4-4-0	2028–2039	Baldwin	1886–1887	12	0	1950	Ex WC Nos. 95–106
	C-24	4-4-0	2040	Brooks	1902 (rebuilt)	1	0	1916	Built as WC 4-6-0 No. 207
	C-25	4-4-0	2041–2042	Schenectady	1887	2	0	1939	Ex MStP&SSteM Nos. 24 and 29

=== Class D: 2-6-0 ===
Class D was for the 2-6-0 "Mogul" type.

Image	Class	Wheel arrangement	Fleet number(s)	Manufacturer	Year made	Quantity made	Quantity preserved	Year(s) retired	Comments
2-6-0 — oOOO — Mogul
	D	2-6-0	100–107	Rhode Island	1888	8	0	1927	
	D-1	2-6-0	200–207	Brooks	1888	8	0	1927	Ex DSS&A
	D-2	2-6-0	108–172	Alco-Schenectady	1903–1917	65	0	1927-1928	
	D-3	2-6-0	208			1	0	1929	Ex Wisconsin and Northern Railway No. 6
	D-4	2-6-0	209			1	0	1930	Ex Wisconsin and Northern Railway No. 7; exx New York Central Railroad
	D-20	2-6-0	2100–2120	Baldwin	1887	21	0	1931	Ex WC Nos. 108–128
	Z	2-6-0	322	Baldwin	1887	1	0	1932	Narrow gauge; ex Minneapolis Street Railway No. 13; sold to Wisconsin and Chippewa Railway No. 999

=== Class E: 4-6-0 ===
Class E was for the 4-6-0 type."Ten-Wheeler"

Image	Class	Wheel arrangement	Fleet number(s)	Manufacturer	Year made	Quantity made	Quantity preserved	Year(s) retired	Comments
4-6-0 — ooOOO
	E	4-6-0	500–504		1898	5	0	1925	Renumbered 600–604 in 1906
	E-1	4-6-0	505–511	Baldwin	1902	7	0	1926	Renumbered 605–611 in 1906
	E-2	4-6-0	612–613	Alco-Schenectady	1913, 1915	2	0	1927	Ex Wisconsin and Northern Railway Nos. 4 and 5, acquired 1921
	E-20	4-6-0	2600–2608	Brooks	1890	10	0	1928	Ex Wisconsin Central Railway 201–210 (207 rebuilt to 4–4–0)
	E-21	4-6-0	2609–2618	Brooks	1891	10	0	1929	Ex Wisconsin Central Railway 211–220
	E-22	4-6-0	2619–2638	Brooks	1898–1900	17	0	1930	Ex Wisconsin Central Railway 221–226, 231–241
	E-23	4-6-0	2625–2628	Brooks	1898	4	0	1931	Ex Wisconsin Central Railway 227–230
	E-24	4-6-0	2640–2644	Brooks	1900	5	0	1932	Ex Wisconsin Central Railway 242–246
	E-25	4-6-0	2645–2654	Brooks	1900	10	1	1933	Ex Wisconsin Central Railway 247–256; 2645 (ex WC 247) preserved

=== Class F: 2-8-0 ===
Class F was for the 2-8-0 "Consolidation" type.

Image	Class	Wheel arrangement	Fleet number(s)	Manufacturer	Year made	Quantity made	Quantity preserved	Year(s) retired	Comments
2-8-0 — oOOOO — Consolidation
	F-1	2-8-0	403–405, 407–412	Schenectady	1893	9	0	1933	
	F-2	2-8-0	406	Schenectady	1893	1	0	1934	
	F-3	2-8-0	413–416	Schenectady	1893	4	0	1935	
	F-4	2-8-0	417	Schenectady	1893	1	0	1936	
	F-6	2-8-0	400–402, 418–427	Rhode Island	1893	13	0	1937	
	F-7	2-8-0	428–430	Schenectady	1900	3	0	1938	
	F-8	2-8-0	431–444	Alco-Schenectady	1902–1903	14	1	1939	440 preserved
	F-9	2-8-0	445–472	Alco-Schenectady	1905–1906	28	1	1940	451 preserved
	F-10	2-8-0	473–474	Alco-Schenectady	1909	2	0	1941	
	F-11	2-8-0	475–484	Alco-Schenectady	1910	10	0	1942	
	F-12	2-8-0	485–499	Alco-Schenectady	1912–1913	15	0	1943	
	F-20	2-8-0	2400–2424	Alco-Schenectady	1903–1907	25	1	1944	Ex Wisconsin Central Railway Nos. 160–184; 2412 preserved
	F-21	2-8-0	2425–2428	Alco-Schenectady	1909	4	1	1945	2425 preserved
	F-22	2-8-0	2429–2443	Alco-Schenectady	1911	15	1	1946	2442 preserved
	F-23	2-8-0	2444–2450	Alco-Schenectady	1914	7	0	1947	

=== Class G: 2-10-0 ===
Class G was the 2-10-0 type.

Image	Class	Wheel arrangement	Fleet number(s)	Manufacturer	Year made	Quantity made	Quantity preserved	Year(s) retired	Comments
2-10-0 — oOOOOO
	G	2-10-0	600	Baldwin	1900	1	1	1960	Built as Vauclain compound; rebuilt as simple and renumbered 950; Preserved

=== Class H: 4-6-2 ===
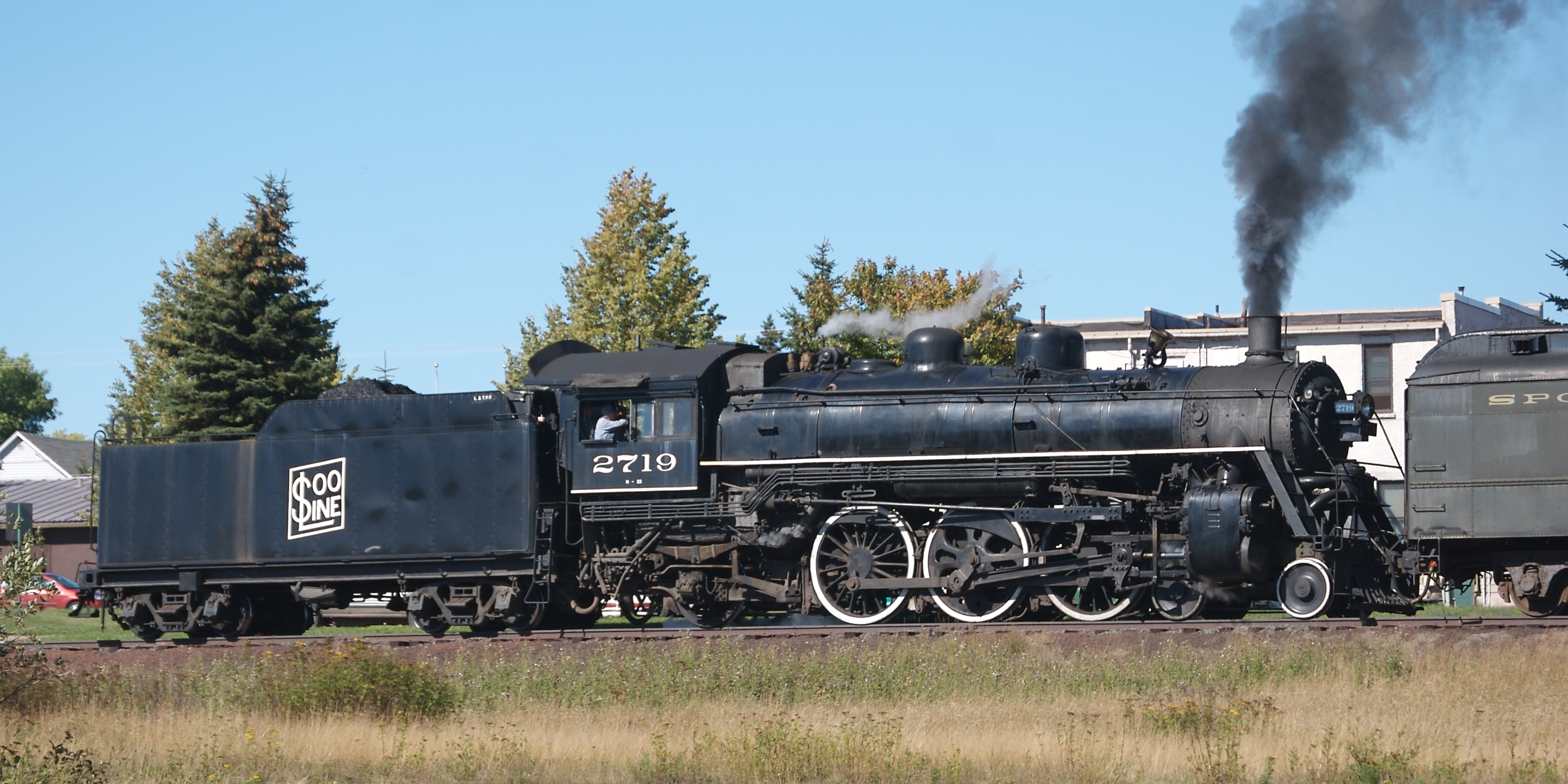
Soo Line 2719

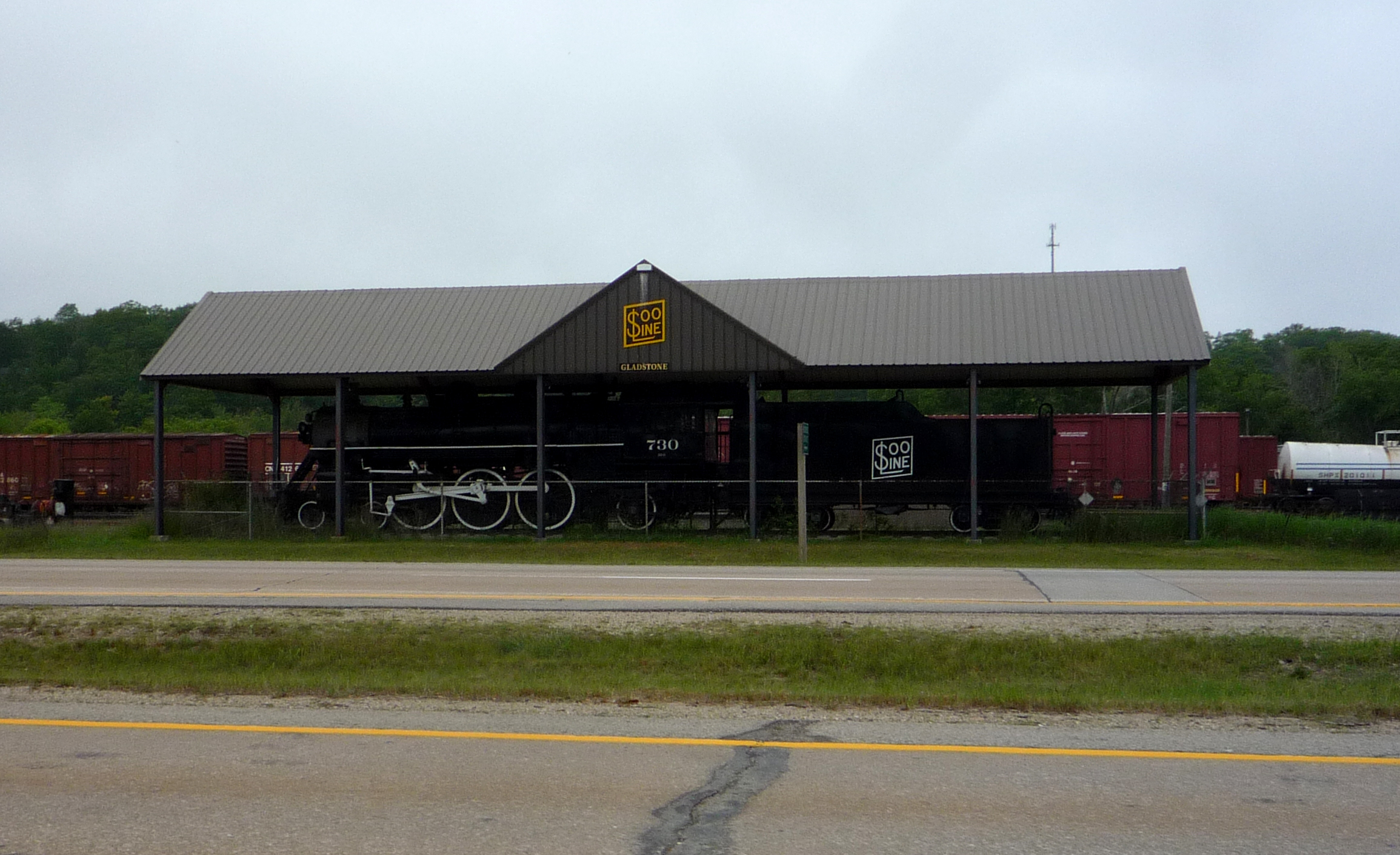
4-6-2 Pacific H-3 (730), Gladstone, MI

Class H covered the 4-6-2 "Pacific" type.

Image	Class	Wheel arrangement	Fleet number(s)	Manufacturer	Year made	Quantity made	Quantity preserved	Year(s) retired	Comments
4-6-2 — ooOOOo — Pacific
	H	4-6-2	700	Baldwin	1904	1	0	1929	Ex Bismarck, Washburn and Great Falls Railway No. 4
	H-1	4-6-2	701–722	Alco-Schenectady	1904–1907	22	0	1930	
	H-2	4-6-2	723–726	Alco-Schenectady	1910	4	0	1930-1939	
	H-3	4-6-2	727–737	Alco-Schenectady	1911–1913	11	3	1939-1947	730, 735 and 736 preserved
	H-20	4-6-2	2700–2703	Alco-Schenectady	1909	4	0	1939-1948	
	H-21	4-6-2	2704–2713	Alco-Schenectady	1911–1913	10	1	1949	2713 preserved
	H-22	4-6-2	2714–2717	Alco-Schenectady	1914	4	1	1950	2714 preserved
	H-23	4-6-2	2718–2722	Alco-Schenectady	1923	6	2	1951-1955	2718 and 2719 preserved

=== Class J: 2-6-2 ===
Class J comprised 2-6-2 "Prairie" locomotives.

Image	Class	Wheel arrangement	Fleet number(s)	Manufacturer	Year made	Quantity made	Quantity preserved	Year(s) retired	Comments
2-6-2 — oOOOo — Prairie
	J	2-6-2	800–809	Alco-Schenectady	1907	10	0	1939-1949	

=== Class K: 4-4-2 ===
Class K comprised 4-4-2 "Atlantic" locomotives.

Image	Class	Wheel arrangement	Fleet number(s)	Manufacturer	Year made	Quantity made	Quantity preserved	Year(s) retired	Comments
4-4-2 — ooOOo — Atlantic
	K-20	4-4-2	2900–2914	Alco-Brooks	1902–1905	15	0	1942-1944	Ex Wisconsin Central Railway 257–271

=== Class L: 2-8-2 ===
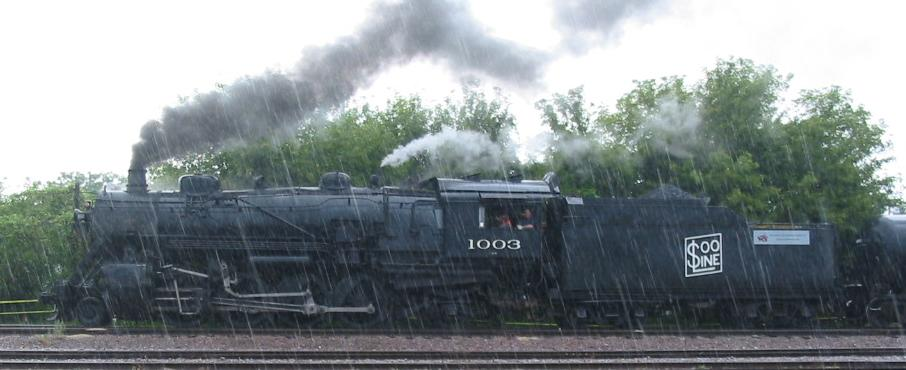
Soo Line 1003

Class L was for 2-8-2 "Mikado" locomotives.

Image	Class	Wheel arrangement	Fleet number(s)	Manufacturer	Year made	Quantity made	Quantity preserved	Year(s) retired	Comments
2-8-2 — oOOOOo — Mikado
	L	2-8-2	1000	Baldwin	1900	1	0	1923	Ex Bismarck, Washburn and Great Falls Railway No. 3
	L-1	2-8-2	1001–1010	Alco-Schenectady	1913	10	1	1954	1003 preserved
	L-2	2-8-2	1011–1023	Alco-Brooks	1920	13	1	1940-1955	1011 preserved
	L-3	2-8-2	1030–1033	Baldwin	1913	4	0	1956	ex Rock Island K-60 class acquired 1941
	L-4	2-8-2	1024–1027, 1034–1037	Alco-Brooks	1912	8	1	1957	ex Monon J-1 class acquired 1941–1942; 1024 (Monon 504) preserved
	L-20	2-8-2	3000–3011	Alco-Brooks	1920	12	0	1947-1959	

=== Class N: 4-8-2 ===
Class N comprised 4-8-2 "Mountain" locomotives.

Image	Class	Wheel arrangement	Fleet number(s)	Manufacturer	Year made	Quantity made	Quantity preserved	Year(s) retired	Comments
4-8-2 — ooOOOOo — Mountain
	N-20	4-8-2	4000–4009	Alco-Brooks	1926	10	0	1943-1946	One tender is currently used behind Soo Line 1003.
	N-20	4-8-2	4010–4017	Alco-Schenectady	1928	8	0	1947	One tender repurposed as a fuel tender. Currently paired with CB&Q locomotive No. 4960.
	N-20	4-8-2	4018–4020	Soo's Shoreham Shops	1930	3	0	1948-1949	Boilers supplied by Alco

=== Class O: 4-8-4 ===
Class O were 4-8-4 "Northern" locomotives.

Image	Class	Wheel arrangement	Fleet number(s)	Manufacturer	Year made	Quantity made	Quantity preserved	Year(s) retired	Comments
4-8-4 — ooOOOOoo — Northern
	O-20	4-8-4	5000–5003	Lima	1938	4	0	1950-1951	

== Diesel locomotives ==
=== ALCO ===
- ALCO FA: 22 locomotives (205A+B–211A+B, 2220A+B–2223A+B)
- ALCO S-2: 7 locomotives (2103–2107, 2109–2110)
- ALCO S-4: 1 locomotives (2116)
- ALCO RS-1: 13 locomotives (350–353, 2360–2368), plus 8 from the DSS&A (100–107)
- ALCO RSC-2: 4 locomotives (368–371)
- ALCO RSC-3: 4 locomotives (372–374, 2380)
- ALCO RS-27: 2 locomotives (415–416)

=== Baldwin ===
- Baldwin VO-1000: 1 locomotive (310)
- Baldwin DS-4-4-1000: 2 locomotives (311–312)
- Baldwin S-12: 2 locomotives (313–314)
- Baldwin DRS-4-4-1500, 8 locomotives (360–367)
- Baldwin AS-16, 2 locomotives (379–380)
- Baldwin DRS-6-6-1500 4 locomotives (384–387) from the DSS&A (200–203)
- Baldwin AS-616, 8 locomotives (388–395) from the DSS&A (204–211)
- Baldwin DT-6-6-2000 4 locomotives (396–399) from the DSS&A (300–303)

=== EMD ===
==== Switchers ====
- EMD SW1: 1 locomotive (320)
- EMC NW1A: 3 locomotives (2100–2102), entire production for this model
- EMD NW2: 3 locomotives (300, 301, 2108)
- EMD SW9: 8 locomotives (2111–2115, 2117–2119)
- EMD SW1200: 16 locomotives (321–328, 2120–2127)

==== Cab units ====
- EMD F3: 13 locomotives (12 A units: 200A+B–204A+B, 2200A+B, 1 B unit: 2200C)
- EMD F7: 36 locomotives (26 A units: 212A+B–214A+B, 2201A+B–2203A+B, 2224A+B–2230A+B, 10 B units: 2201C–2204C, 500C–503C, 2500C, 2501C)
- EMD FP7: 8 locomotives (500A–503A, 504, 505, 2500A, 2501A)

==== Hood units ====
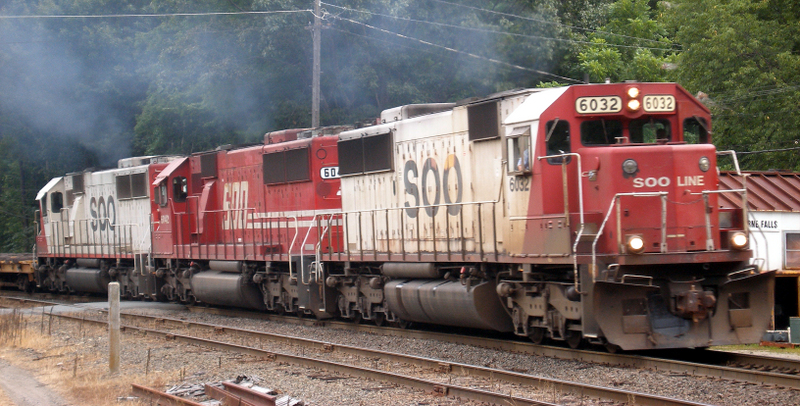
Soo Line SD60s

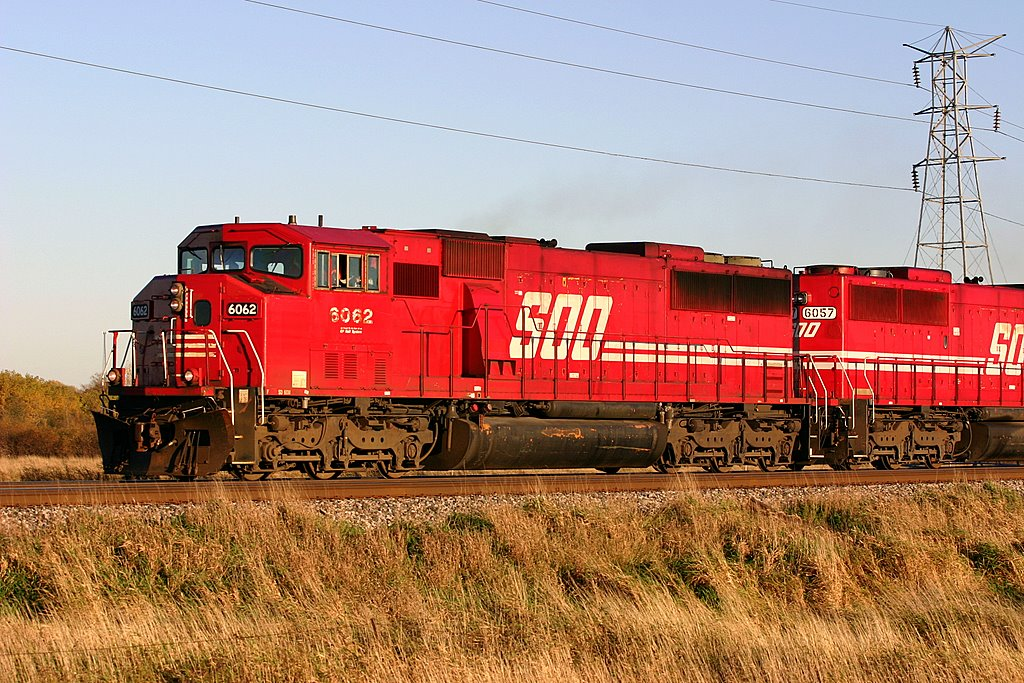
Soo Line SD60M #6062 in the "Candy Apple Red" paint scheme

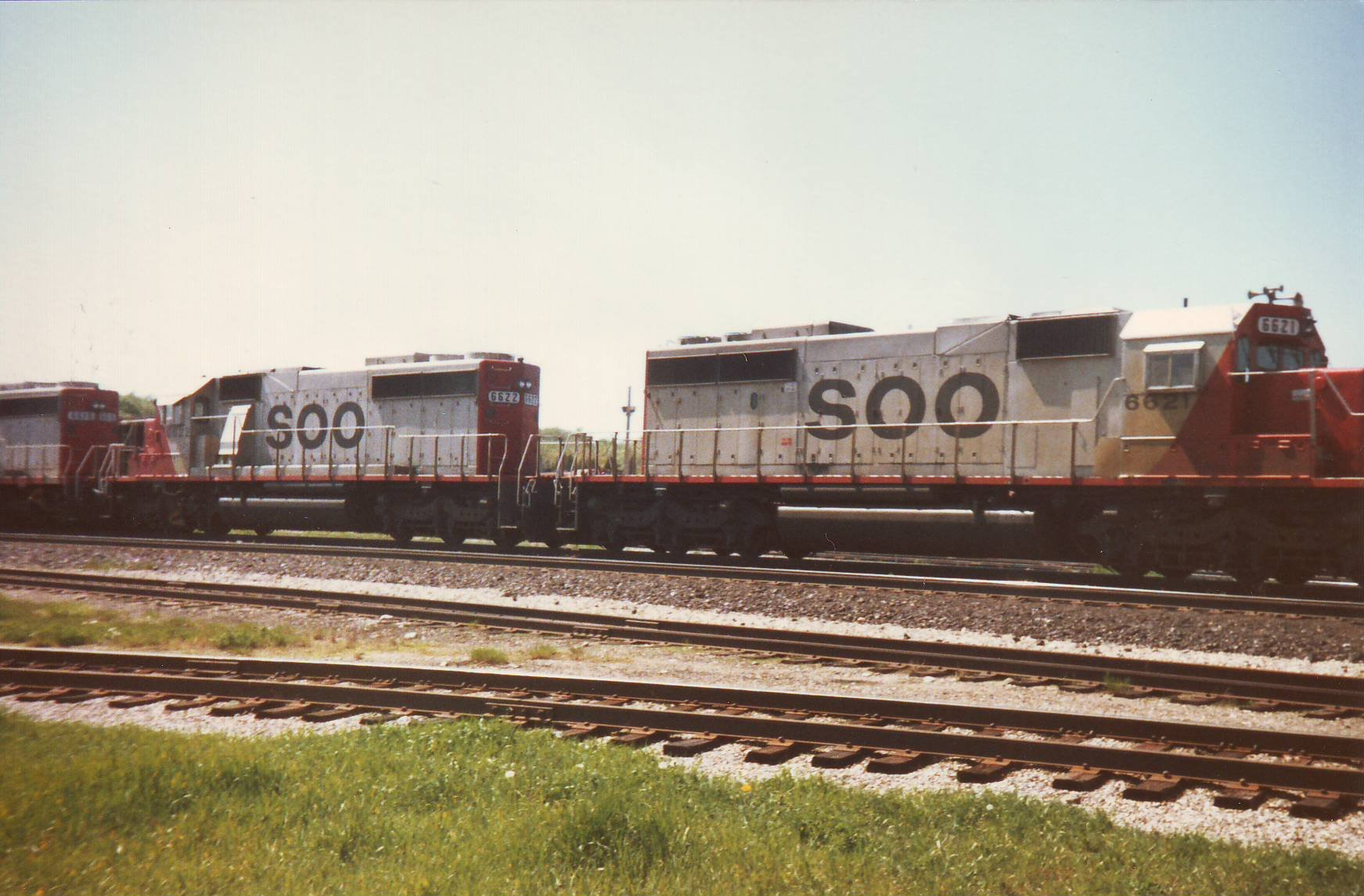
Soo Line SD40-2s #6621 and #6622 in 1988

- EMD GP7: 7 locomotives (375–378, 381–383)
- EMD GP9: 45 locomotives (400–414, 550–558, 2400–2413, 2550–2556)
- EMD SD9: 1 locomotive (2381)
- EMD GP30: 22 locomotives (700–721)
- EMD GP35: 10 locomotives (722–731)
- EMD GP40: 4 locomotives (732–735)
- EMD SD40: 21 locomotives (736–756)
- EMD SD40-2: 57 locomotives (757–789, 6600–6623)
- EMD GP38-2: 53 locomotives (4400–4452)
- EMD SD60: 58 locomotives (6000–6057)
- EMD SD60M: 5 locomotives (6058–6062)

=== Fairbanks-Morse ===
- FM H-12-44: 5 locomotives (315–319), built 1952 and 1954

=== General Electric ===
- GE 44-ton: 1 locomotive (330), built 1941
- GE U30C: 10 locomotives (800–809), built 1968
