= EMD SW1000 =

Type of American switching locomotive

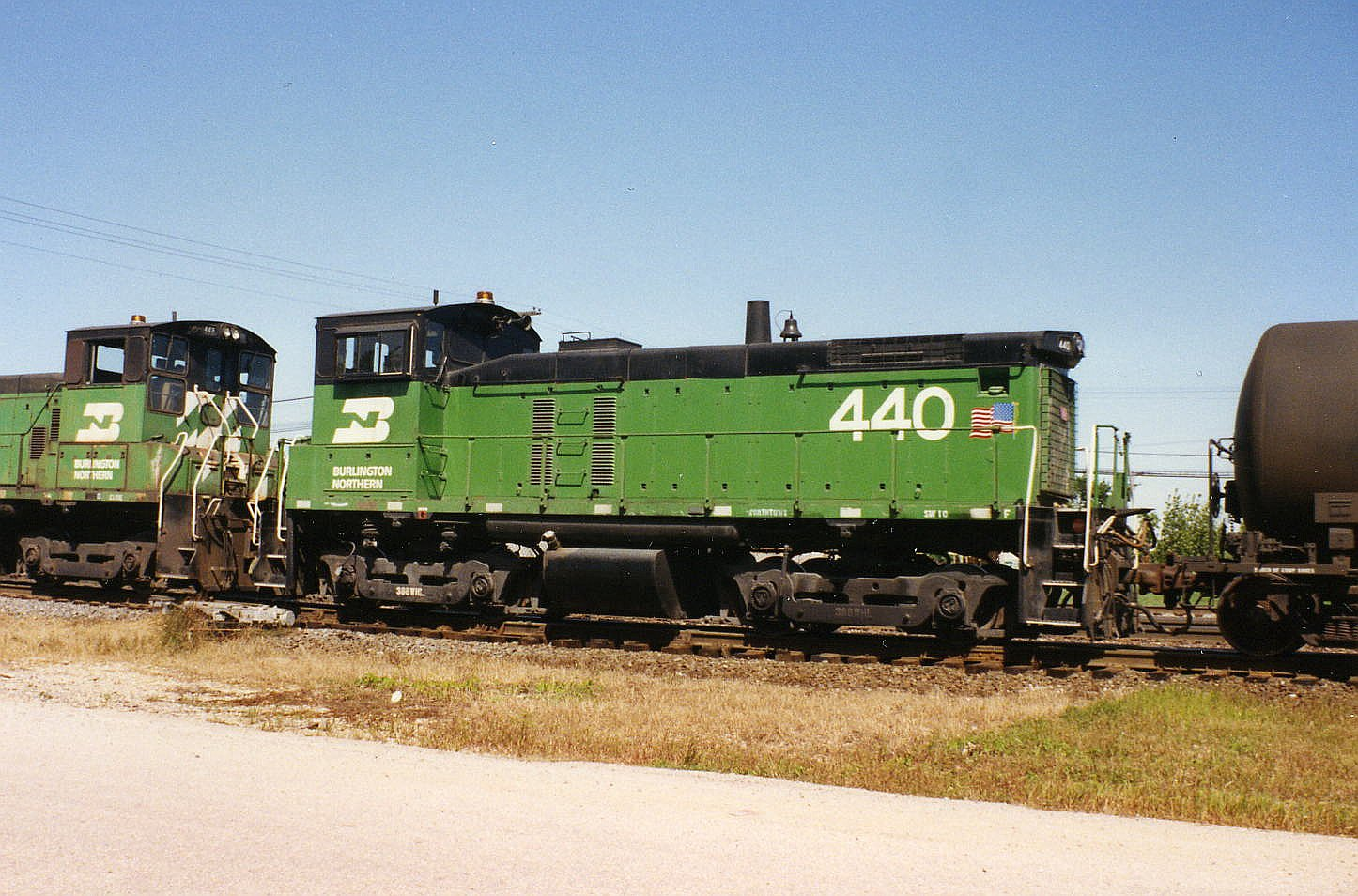
- BN 440, an SW1000, works in Eola Yard at Aurora, Illinois
Type and origin
- Power type: Diesel–electric
- Builder: General Motors Electro-Motive Division
- Model: SW1000
- Build date: June 1966 – October 1972
- Total produced: 119
Specifications
- Configuration
  - AAR: B-B
- Gauge: 4 ft 8 1/2 in (1,435 mm)
- Length: 44 ft 8 in (13.61 m)
- Prime mover: EMD 645
- Engine type: V8 Diesel engine
- Cylinders: 8
Performance figures
- Power output: 1,000 hp (750 kW)
Career
- Locale: United States; Jamaica; Mexico; South Korea; Canada

The EMD SW1000 was a model of 4-axle diesel switcher locomotives built by General Motors Electro-Motive Division between June 1966 and October 1972. Power was provided by an EMD 645E 8-cylinder engine which generated 1,000 horsepower (750 kW). This locomotive was built on the same common frame as the EMD SW1500, giving it an overall length of 44 feet 8 inches (13.61 m). Over one-third of SW1000 production went to the Burlington Northern Railroad.

== History ==
The SW1000 was taller than previous EMD switchers, which posed a problem for industrial customers: at many facilities, tight clearances existed, and the SW1000 exceeded them. As a result, most production went to railroads, not industries. EMD corrected this problem with the SW1001, which was an SW1000 with its height and walkways lowered for better clearance.

A total of 114 EMD SW1000s were built for railroads and industrial operations in the United States. One was exported to Jamaica for a mining operation and four were exported to industrial operators in Mexico.

As at January 2014, two EMD SW1000s are operated by Via Rail at its Montreal Maintenance Centre.

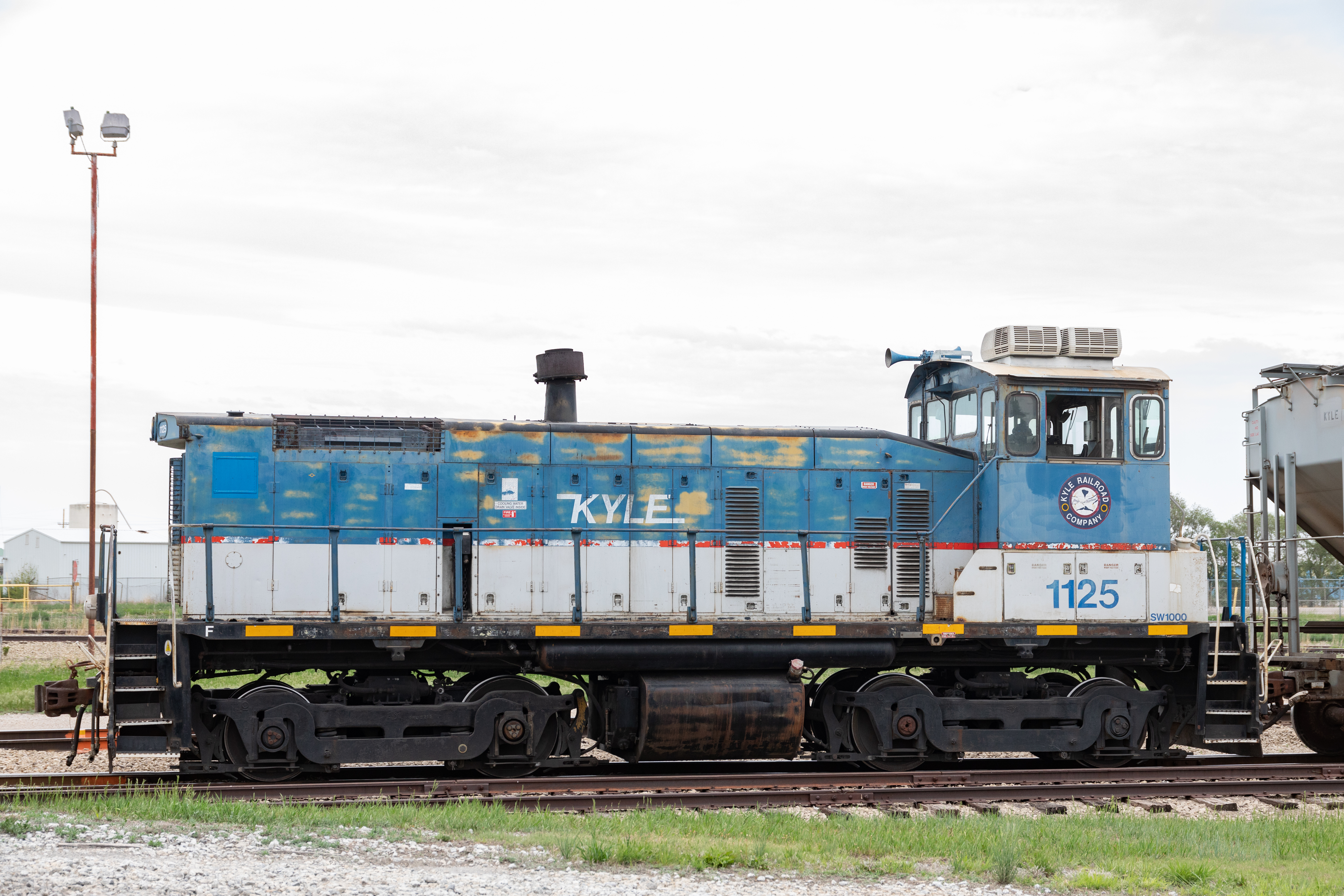
The KYLE Railroad operates an SW1000 at its Phillipsburg, Kansas yard, seen here in May 2023.

== Preservation ==
- BNSF #3613 (former BN #388) is preserved at the Oregon Rail Heritage Center in Portland, Oregon.

== SW1000 Locomotives as built by EMD ==
Railroad	Quantity	Road numbers	Notes
Altos Hornos de Mexico	2	132, 137	
Cementos Anahuac (Mexico)	1	No Number	Transferred to Cemex acquired Anahuac in 1987
Appalachian Power	1	1	Now owned by Roanoke Chapter NRHS.
Armco Steel	1	B81	
Birmingham Southern Railroad	8	10-17	15 to 17 scrapped 1973; 13 became 213 and sold to Watco, Inc.
Burlington Northern	43	375-394, 427-449	#442 rebuilt without cab; transferred to BNSF with one sold to GATX Rail Locomotive Group
Chicago Burlington and Quincy	12	9310-9321	to Burlington Northern 574-585
Ferrocarril Chihuahua Cellulose (Mexico)	1	1811	to Ferromex
Corn Products International	2	68–69	
Cuyahoga Valley Railroad	1	1050	
Denver and Rio Grande Western	10	140-149	
Detroit Edison	1	216	
Duluth and Northeastern	1	35	to Cloquet Terminal Railroad
Eastman Kodak	1	8	
E I DuPont Nemours and Company	2	106-107	Operated by the Southern Railroad of New Jersey at the Chemours Chambers works, sold to SMS rail. 106 undergoing rebuild, 107 operating.
General Motors-Central Foundry Division	1	No Number	
Great Lakes Steel Corporation	1	58	
Hampton and Branchville	1	120	
Houston Belt and Terminal	3	40-42	
Inland Steel	4	115-118	All sold to Via Rail
Jones and Laughlin Steel	2	102–103	
Kaiser Bauxite (Jamaica)	1	5109	
Mobil Chemical	1	2	
New Orleans Public Belt	6	101-106	
Public Service Company of Indiana	1	1	
Wisconsin Electric Power	1	No Number	
Youngstown Sheet and Tube	10	905-914	
Total	119		

== See also ==
- List of GM-EMD locomotives
