= Steam locomotive 29 =

Steam locomotive 29 may refer to:

- Canadian Pacific 29, a 4-4-0 built in 1887, currently on static display outside of the Canadian Pacific Railway's headquarters in Calgary, Alberta.
- Copper Range 29, a 2-8-0 built in 1907, currently on display at the Mid-Continent Railway Museum in North Freedom, Wisconsin while slowly undergoing a cosmetic stabilization.
- Duluth and Northeastern 29, a United States Army 0-6-0 built in 1944, currently used to pull tourist trains on the Prairie Village, Herman and Milwaukee Railroad in Prairie Village, South Dakota.
- Grand Canyon Railway 29, an Ex-Lake Superior and Ishpeming 2-8-0 built in 1906, currently undergoing an FRA-required overhaul by the Grand Canyon Railway in Williams, Arizona.
- LCR 29, an 0-6-2 tank built in 1904, currently operational at the North Yorkshire Moors Railway in North Yorkshire.
