= The Honeymooners (disambiguation) =

The Honeymooners is a classic American television sitcom created by and starring Jackie Gleason.

The Honeymooners may also refer to:

- The Honeymooners (2003 film), an Irish independent comedy film by Karl Golden
- The Honeymooners (2005 film), an American theatrical film by John Schultz
- "The Honeymooners" (King of the Hill), a 2010 television episode
- "The Honeymooners" (Three's a Crowd), a 1984 television episode
- The Honeymooner, a passenger train on the Pennsylvania-Reading Seashore Lines
- Brand New Life: The Honeymooners, 1989 pilot film of the American comedy-drama television series Brand New Life
- The Honeymooners, a 2017 musical based on the Jackie Gleason show directed by John Rando

== See also ==
- Honeymooner, a 2010 British comedy-drama independent film
