= Duluth and Northeastern 28 =

2-8-0 Consolidation steam locomotive

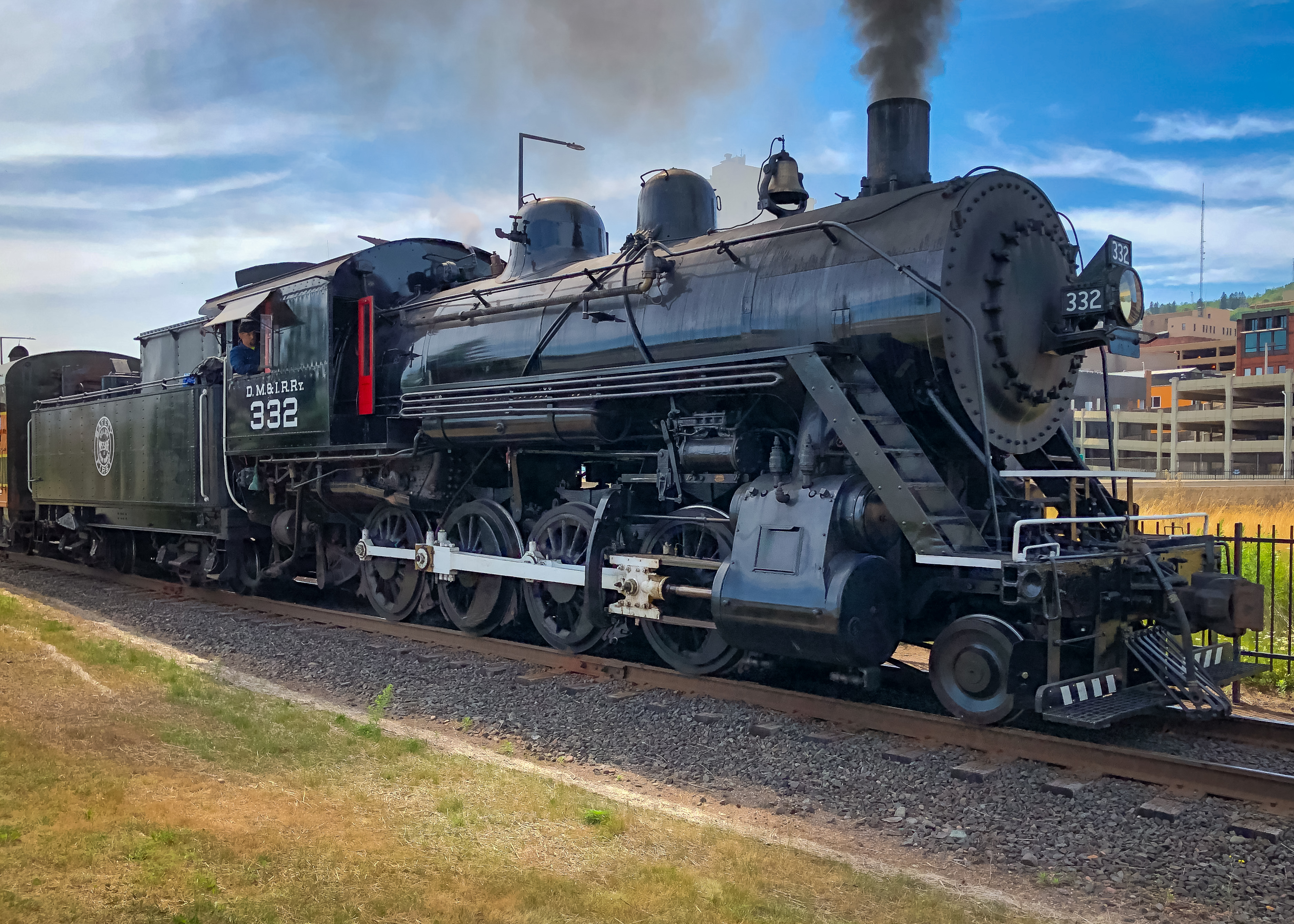
- D&NE No. 28 operating as DM&IR No. 332 in Duluth, Minnesota in 2019
Type and origin
- Power type: Steam
- Builder: American Locomotive Company (Pittsburg Works)
- Serial number: 39587
- Build date: 1906
Specifications
- Configuration
  - Whyte: 2-8-0
  - UIC: 1′D h2
- Gauge: 4 ft 8 1/2 in (1,435 mm)
- Driver dia.: 56 in (1,422 mm)
- Loco weight: 185,000 lb (83.9 tonnes)
- Fuel type: Coal
- Boiler pressure: 190 lbf/in^{2} (1.31 MPa)
- Cylinders: Two, outside
- Cylinder size: 22 in × 28 in (559 mm × 711 mm)
- Valve gear: Stephenson
- Valve type: Piston valves
- Loco brake: Air
- Train brakes: Air
- Couplers: Knuckle
Performance figures
- Tractive effort: 42,700 lbf (189.94 kN)
Career
- Operators: Duluth, Missabe and Northern Railway; Duluth, Missabe and Iron Range Railway; Duluth and Northeastern Railroad; Lake Superior Railroad Museum; North Shore Scenic Railroad
- Class: C3
- Number in class: DM&N 14 of 32; D&NE 2 of 2
- Numbers: DM&N/DMIR 332; D&NE 28
- Locale: Minnesota, United States
- Retired: August 29, 1965
- Restored: April 2017
- Current owner: Lake Superior Railroad Museum
- Disposition: Operational

Duluth and Northeastern 28 (also known as Duluth, Missabe and Iron Range 332) is a preserved C3 class 2-8-0 "Consolidation" type steam locomotive, built in 1906 by the Pittsburg Works of the American Locomotive Company (ALCO) in Pittsburgh, Pennsylvania. It was restored to operating condition by the Lake Superior Railroad Museum and now operates in excursion service on the North Shore Scenic Railroad.

== History ==
=== Revenue service ===
The locomotive was built in 1906 by the American Locomotive Company's (ALCO) Pittsburg Works for the Duluth, Missabe, and Northern Railway (DM&N) as number 332; one of 32 locomotives of the C3 class built between 1905 and 1907. (Note: The location was known as Pittsburg Works at the time these locomotives were built from 1891 till 1911.) In 1937 it passed to the Duluth, Missabe, and Iron Range Railway on the merger of the DM&N with the Duluth and Iron Range Rail Road (DMIR). In 1955 locomotives 332 and 348 (also a C3) were sold to the Duluth and Northeastern Railroad (DNE) and renumbered 28 and 27 respectively.

No. 28 saw regular service on the D&NE between Cloquet, Saginaw, and Duluth, Minnesota. It was one of only five remaining steam locomotives for the D&NE by 1964, when dieselization was eliminating the use of steam. D&NE retained No. 28 and used it for only special excursions until 1965. It was then put in storage in Cloquet.

=== Preservation and restoration ===
In 1974, the locomotive was cleaned, repainted, and donated to the Lake Superior Railroad Museum (LSRX). There it was on static display until December 2011 when the locomotive was returned to the Cloquet Terminal Railroad for a cosmetic restoration.

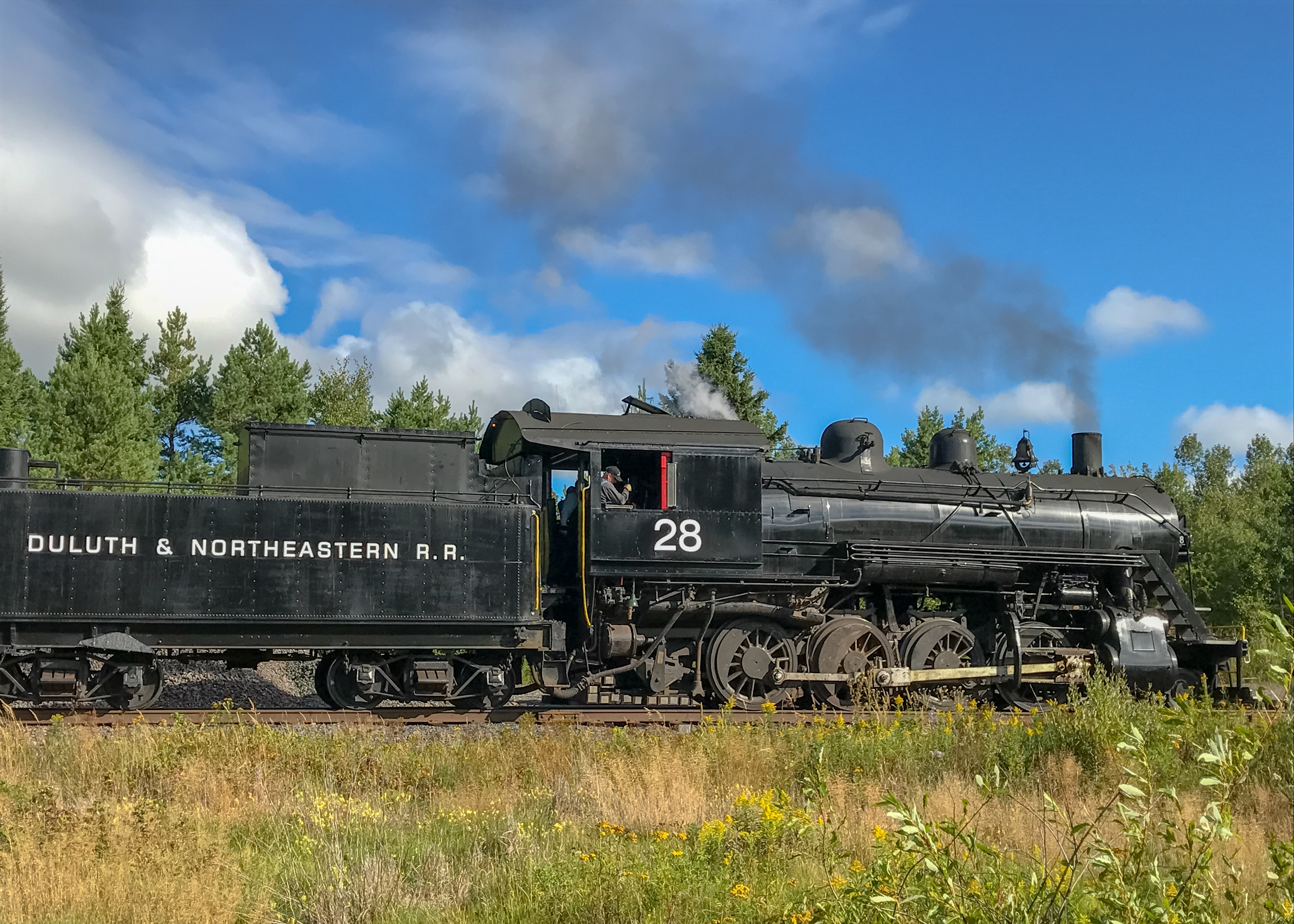
D&NE 28 operating in Palmers, MN. 2017.

It was later announced by the Lake Superior Railroad Museum in March 2014 that the 28 would be restored to operating condition instead, and would pull excursions on the North Shore Scenic Railroad. "Fire up the 28" fundraiser was held in order to pay the $11,700 needed for boiler flues which are required for operation. Within a week, the museum had raised over half the required funds. By April, the total amount of funds raised was well over $15,000, more than enough to cover the cost of its restoration. The extra funds would be used in maintaining and operating the locomotive. The total cost of the restoration was in excess of $750,000 and thousands of volunteer hours.

Sister engine No. 27 is displayed at the Carlton County Fairgrounds, Barnum, Minnesota, and DM&N 347 (another C3 locomotive) is displayed at the Museum of Mining, Chisholm, Minnesota. Some parts from No. 27 were used in the operational restoration of No. 28 in Duluth.

There were a few factors that made No. 28 a good choice for operational restoration. First, the engine was retired in 1965 in operating condition. Two, the engine was stored indoors to protect it from vandalism and weather. And three, the engine was kept on display indoors for the entire time it was at the museum.

In the summer of 2014, Cloquet Terminal Railroad ended its part in the restoration process due to management changes. On August 27, 2014, the flues for #28 arrived at the Lake Superior Railroad Museum from Germany. It was then decided that 28 would return to the Lake Superior Railroad Museum to complete its restoration with the installation of the flues. On February 3, 2015, #28 was moved back to the Lake Superior Railroad Museum via BNSF Railway to complete its restoration. The remainder of the restoration included boiler flue installation, insulation & jacketing, as well as repainting. By the end of spring 2015, new metalwork had been installed in the smoke-box and outside the cab. The pilot, running gear, and hand-grabs had been painted.

Work on flue installation by Fraser Shipyards began November 17, 2015, and was completed on December 26, 2015. The 28's wheels were given clearance by the FRA a few months later. In March 2016, the brass and cab water-level meters were reinstalled, the super-heater tubes were being reassembled for installation, and the blow-down valves were sent to Colorado for rebuilding. The hydro-test was scheduled for July 13, 2016. The FRA report was filed on July 20, 2016, stating the locomotive passed the test. The cab was painted black with red windows in June. The smoke box front was being installed in early August. Insulation and lagging and a new boiler jacket were supplied to the museum to finish locomotive assembly at no charge. Insulation was installed on the boiler beginning August 12, according to the North Shore Scenic Railroad's Facebook page.

The FRA officially began its 15-year or 1,472 days inspection period on November 4, 2016. By January, the locomotive's jacketing had been installed and painted, and its headlight was restored. The #28 had a successful test fire April 3 and 4th, with a few last minute touches (such as painting the steam dome) to be completed. A final test fire occurred in June.

=== Excursion service ===
Completion of the restoration was April/May 2017. The 28 underwent successful test runs in April and May. The first excursions of the 28 took place June 10 and 11, 2017. These two excursions, for donors to the restoration project, operated from the Duluth Union Depot to Palmers, Minnesota roughly 16 miles up the former DM&IR, tracks once used by the 28 in regular service. Regular steam excursions to the general public were announced, a total of 27 excursions in 2017. Excursions would be split between Palmers, on Sundays, and Two Harbors on Fridays and Saturdays. DN&E 28 did not run in 2018 in order for the museum to improve the locomotive's condition, and it later operated on several weekends in 2019.

For the 2019 operating season, the D&NE 28 was redone as DM&IR 332. On July 19, 2019 DM&IR 332 (D&NE 28) met Union Pacific 4014 during a "festival of steam" hosted by the museum to welcome the "Big Boy" to Duluth as it made its Midwest tour. The 332 operated excursions on July 20 & 21 while the UP 4014 was displayed at the museum alongside D&NM 14 and Soo Line 2719.

== See also ==
- Duluth and Northeastern 29
