= Duluth and Northeastern 29 =

Preserved American 0-6-0 locomotive

Type and origin
- Power type: Steam
- Builder: Lima Locomotive Works
- Serial number: 8381
- Build date: January 1944
Specifications
- Configuration
  - Whyte: 0-6-0
  - UIC: C' h2
- Gauge: 4 ft 8 1/2 in (1,435 mm)
- Driver dia.: 51 in (1.295 m)
- Loco weight: 154,500 lb (70,100 kg)
- Fuel type: Coal
- Boiler pressure: 190 psi (1.31 MPa)
- Cylinders: Two, outside
- Cylinder size: 21 in × 28 in (530 mm × 710 mm)
- Valve gear: Walschaerts
Performance figures
- Tractive effort: 40,000 lbf (177.93 kN)
Career
- Operators: United States Army Transportation Corps; Bay Terminal Railroad; Iron and Steel Processing Corp; Duluth and Northeastern Railroad; Prairie Village, Herman and Milwaukee Railroad
- Class: S155
- Numbers: USATC 4047; BTR 111; D&NE 29; PVH&M 29
- Retired: 1965
- Restored: 1977
- Current owner: Prairie Village, Herman and Milwaukee Railroad
- Disposition: Operational

Duluth and Northeastern 29 is a preserved 0-6-0 "Switcher" steam locomotive built in January 1944 by the Lima Locomotive Works (LLW) for the United States Army Transportation Corps. It is currently owned and operated by the Prairie Village, Herman and Milwaukee Railroad in Prairie Village, South Dakota.

== History ==
=== Revenue service ===
No. 29 was initially constructed by the Lima Locomotive Works (LLW) in Lima, Ohio in January 1944 for the United States War Department during World War II as locomotive No. 4047. It was part of the S155 class 0-6-0 switchers, designed to be used for military service in the Far East, Africa, and Europe, but No. 4047 remained on North American soil. The locomotive was instead used for switching in United States military bases. After the war, the locomotive was sold in March 1947 to the Bay Terminal Railroad (BTR), who renumbered it to 111. The BTR used the locomotive to switch freight cars between different areas in rail yards and harbors within the city of Toledo, Ohio. In August 1955, No. 111 was sold again to the Iron and Steel Processing Corporation, who in turn, sold it in April the following year to the Duluth and Northeastern Railroad (D&NE), where the locomotive was renumbered to 29. The locomotive was moved to D&NE trackage in Cloquet, Minnesota, where it was assigned to switch freight cars loaded with lumber. It was retired from revenue service in 1965, and it was subsequently stored in a sideline in Cloquet.

=== Preservation ===
In 1970, No. 29 was sold to Earl Grice of North Mankato, Minnesota. In 1976, the locomotive was sold again to the Historic Prairie Village, Herman and Milwaukee Railroad (PVH&M), who operates on former Milwaukee Road trackage in Prairie Village near Lake Herman State Park in South Dakota. The locomotive was moved to Prairie Village the following year, and work began to restore the locomotive to operating condition. The No. 29 locomotive was subsequently used to pull 2-mile tourist trains in and out of Prairie Village. In 1999, though, No. 29 was removed from service after problems with its firebox were discovered. PVH&M crews subsequently spent the next thirteen years repairing the locomotive's firebox, and in 2013, the locomotive returned to service. As of 2025, No. 29 remains operational, carrying several passengers on a loop track line around Prairie Village, and whenever the winter season arrives, No. 29 is stored indoors along with the PVH&M's diesel locomotives.

== See also ==
- Duluth and Northeastern 28
- United States Army 4039
- Soo Line 353
- Santa Fe 3415
