= Southern Railway 1643 =

Type and origin
- Power type: Steam
- Builder: American Locomotive Company (Pittsburg Works)
- Serial number: 37672
- Build date: September 1905
Specifications
- Configuration
  - Whyte: 0-6-0
- Gauge: 4 ft 8 1/2 in (1,435 mm)
- Driver dia.: 50 in (1.270 m)
- Fuel type: Coal
- Firebox
  - Grate area: 29 sq ft (2.7 m^{2})
- Boiler pressure: 185 psi (1.28 MPa)
- Cylinders: Two, outside
- Cylinder size: 20 in × 26 in (508 mm × 660 mm)
- Valve gear: Stephenson
- Valve type: Piston valves
- Loco brake: Air
- Train brakes: Air
- Couplers: Knuckle
Performance figures
- Tractive effort: 32,710 lbf (145.5 kN)
Career
- Operators: Southern Railway; Morehead and North Fork Railroad; Age of Steam Roundhouse
- Class: A-7
- Numbers: SOU 1643; M&NF 12
- Retired: 1963
- Restored: July 16, 2018
- Current owner: Age of Steam Roundhouse
- Disposition: Operational

Southern Railway 1643 is a preserved A-7 class 0-6-0 "Switcher" type steam locomotive, built in September 1905 by the American Locomotive Company's (ALCO) Pittsburg Works for the Southern Railway (SOU). (Note: The location was known as Pittsburg Works at the time these locomotives were built from 1891 till 1911.)

In 1952, the locomotive was sold to the Morehead and North Fork Railroad (M&NF) in Morehead, Kentucky, where it was renumbered to No. 12, the locomotive operated on the Morehead line, until the company dieselized in 1963. After the locomotive was retired, it was put into storage in one of the railroad's engine sheds. In 2011, No. 12 was purchased by Jerry Jacobson, who moved it to his Age of Steam Roundhouse building in Sugarcreek, Ohio. The locomotive was restored to operating condition in 2018, and it moved under steam for the first time in the 21st century on July 16.
