= Pittsburgh Locomotive and Car Works =

Manufacturing business co-founded by industrialist Andrew Carnegie in 1865

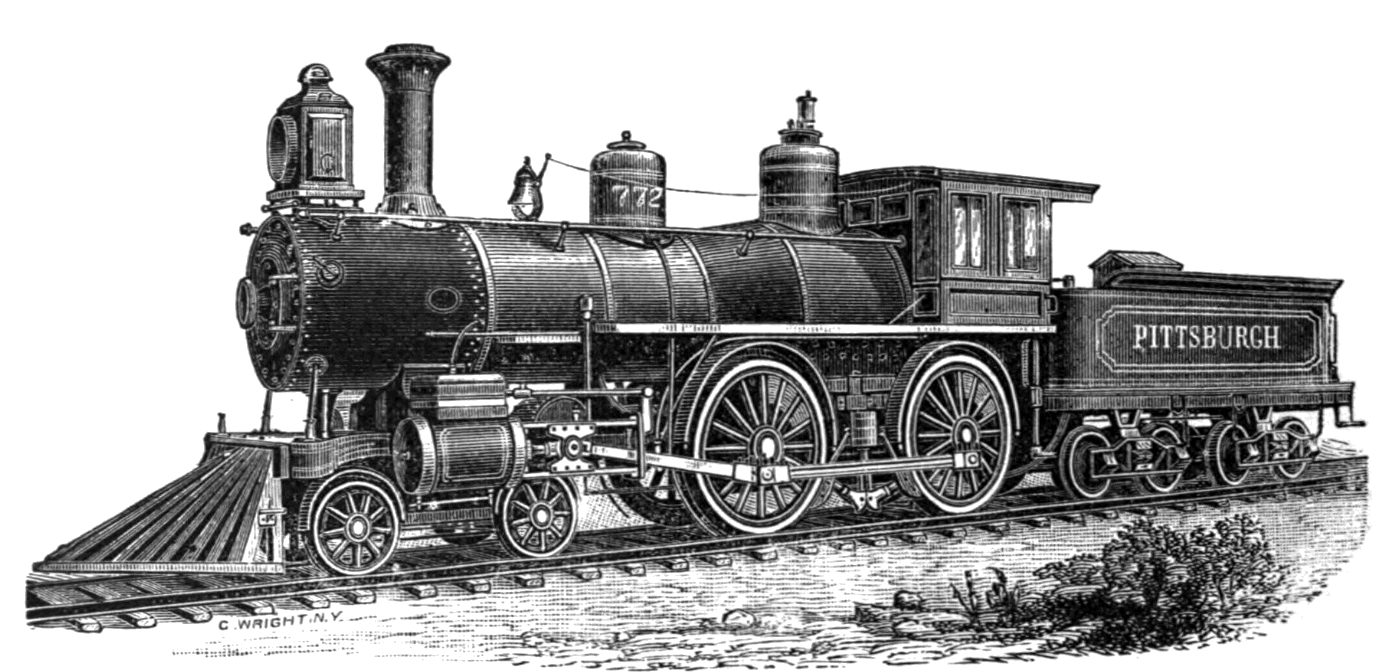
- Industry: Rail transport
- Founded: by Andrew Carnegie and T.N. Miller in 1865
- Defunct: 1901 (Original facility); 1919 (ALCO facility)
- Fate: Merged
- Successor: American Locomotive Company
- Headquarters: Allegheny, Pennsylvania
- Products: Steam locomotives and Automobiles

The Pittsburgh Locomotive and Car Works was a railroad equipment manufacturing company founded by Andrew Carnegie and T.N. Miller in 1865. It was located in Allegheny, Pennsylvania, a suburb of Pittsburgh and since 1907 part of that city.

It repaired an early locomotive known as Bausman's Rhinoceros in April 1867. Starting in the 1870s under its superintendent and general manager Daniel A. Wightman, it became known for its production of large locomotives. Its engines were shipped around the world, including India and Japan.

By 1901, when Pittsburgh had merged with seven other manufacturing companies to form American Locomotive Company (ALCO), Pittsburgh had produced over 2,400 locomotives. In March 1919, ALCO closed the Pittsburgh facility.

== Preserved Pittsburgh locomotives ==
=== Pre-1901 merger ===
Following is a list (in serial number order) of Pittsburgh locomotives built before the ALCO merger that have been spared the scrapper's torch.

Serial number	Wheel arrangement (Whyte notation)	Build date	Operational owner(s)	Disposition
1592	4-6-0	1898	Maritime Coal Railway and Power Company 5	Canadian Railway Museum, Delson, Quebec, Canada
1711	2-6-0T	1897	Hankaku Railway #2851	Shinagawa, Tokyo
1815	2-6-0	1898	Chicago, Burlington and Quincy 1175	Buffalo, Wyoming

=== Post-1901 merger ===
Listed below (likewise in serial number order) are preserved locomotives that were built at the Pittsburgh facility after the ALCO merger.

Serial number	Wheel arrangement (Whyte notation)	Build date	Operational owner(s)	Disposition
37672	0-6-0	1905	Morehead and North Fork 12	Age of Steam Roundhouse, Sugarcreek, Ohio
39570	2-8-0	1906	Duluth and Northeastern 28	Lake Superior Railroad Museum, Duluth, Minnesota
39637	2-8-0	1906	Lake Superior and Ishpeming 29	Grand Canyon Railway, Williams, Arizona
42285	2-8-0	1907	Duluth, Missabe and Iron Range 347	Chisholm, Minnesota
42286	2-8-0	1907	Duluth and Northeastern No. 27	Barnum, Minnesota
46939	2-8-0	1910	Lake Superior and Ishpeming 23	Phoenicia, New York
46941	2-8-0	1910	Lake Superior and Ishpeming 18	Boyertown, Pennsylvania
46942	2-8-0	1910	Lake Superior and Ishpeming 19	Frisco, Texas
46943	2-8-0	1910	Lake Superior and Ishpeming 20	Allen, Texas
46944	2-8-0	1910	Lake Superior and Ishpeming 22	North Freedom, Wisconsin
46945	2-8-0	1910	Lake Superior and Ishpeming 21	Baraboo, Wisconsin
46946	2-8-0	1910	Lake Superior and Ishpeming 24	National Railroad Museum Green Bay, Wisconsin
