= Pennsylvania-Reading Seashore Lines =

Railroad that operated in southern New Jersey

- Pennsylvania-Reading Seashore Lines system map

Overview
- Headquarters: Camden, New Jersey, U.S.
- Reporting mark: PRSL
- Locale: New Jersey, U.S.
- Dates of operation: 1933–1976
- Predecessor: West Jersey and Seashore Railroad and Atlantic City Railroad
- Successor: Conrail (1976-1999); now Norfolk Southern and CSX (both since 1999)

Technical
- Track gauge: 4 ft 8 1/2 in (1,435 mm) standard gauge
- Length: 413 miles (665 kilometres)

The Pennsylvania-Reading Seashore Lines was a railroad that operated in Southern New Jersey in the 20th century. It was created in 1933 as a joint consolidation venture between two competing railroads in the region: the Pennsylvania Railroad and the Reading Company.

== History ==
In the late 19th and early 20th century, Atlantic City and the South Jersey seashore were major seaside vacation destinations for Philadelphia area residents. The popularity of South Jersey's seashore was made possible by rail transport, which provided inexpensive and fast service between the Philadelphia area's population centers and shore points.

There were two competing railroad companies connecting Camden and, by ferry, Philadelphia, with the South Jersey seashore: the West Jersey and Seashore Railroad (WJ&S), owned by the Pennsylvania Railroad, and the Atlantic City Railroad, owned by the Philadelphia and Reading Railway. Competition was fierce, albeit peculiar: "although they met annually [in the 19th century] to set fares and rules for excursion traffic, they battled for passengers by offering faster trains, better equipment, and even bribes to Atlantic City hoteliers and cab drivers." By its height in the 1920s competition was so intense that at one time both lines boasted some of the fastest trains in the world. Trains often raced one another so as to be the first to arrive at their destination. Racing was encouraged by the fact that in many areas, the two lines paralleled only several hundred feet apart. On the Cape May lines, the trains were in sight of each other for 11 miles between Cape May Court House and Cape May. Over the last 5 miles into Cape May, the tracks were only 50 feet apart.

On July 1, 1926, the Benjamin Franklin Bridge opened, spanning the Delaware River, connecting Philadelphia and Camden. Car, truck, and bus usage increased as the state built roads in the 1920s and 30s next to the railroads, cutting into profits.

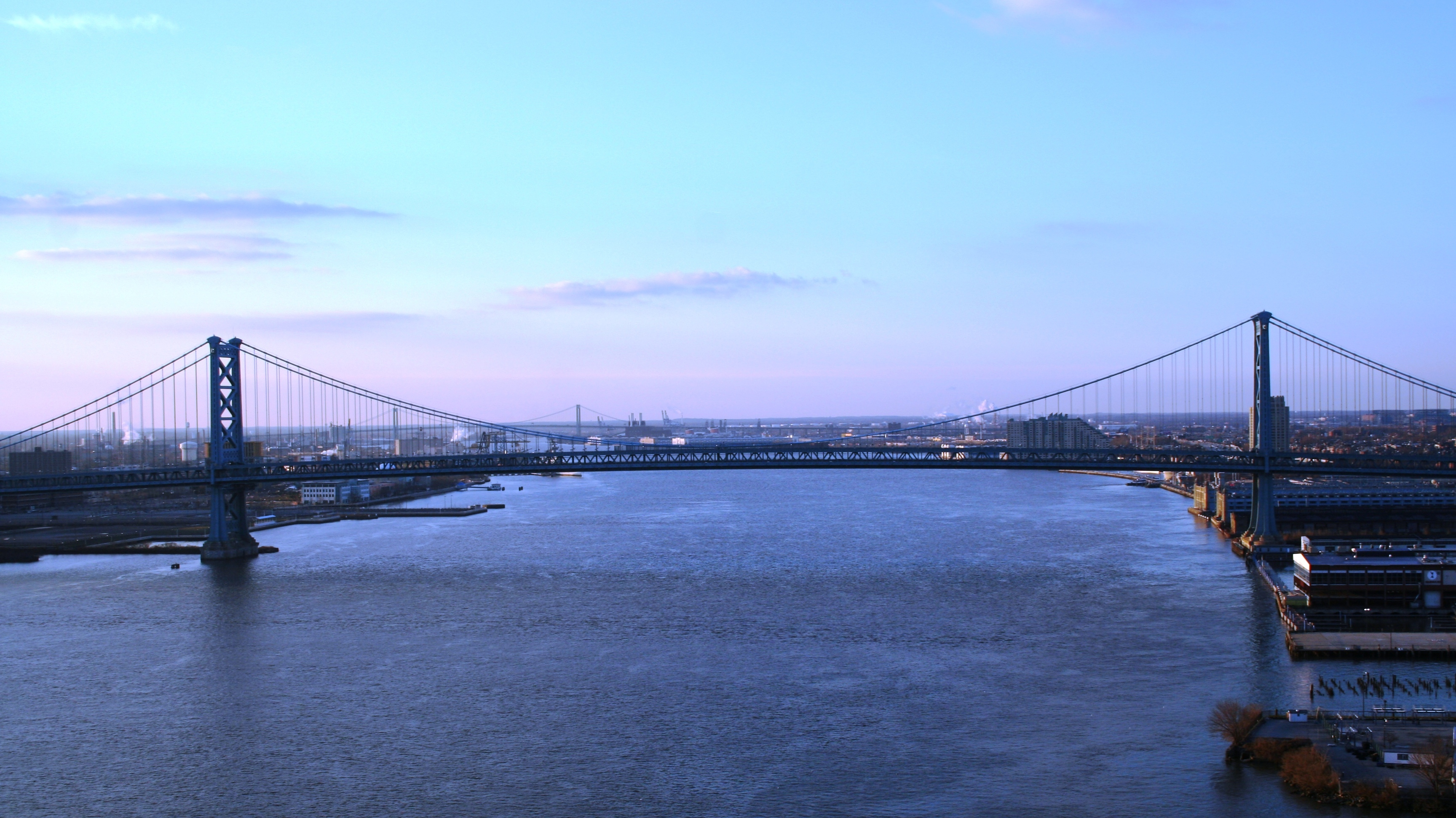
Ben Franklin Bridge looking south

On March 4, 1931, the New Jersey Board of Public Utilities (BPU) ordered the two companies to join their southern New Jersey lines into one company. The Consolidation Agreement decreed that the Pennsylvania Railroad had two-thirds ownership, and the Reading Company had one-third ownership.

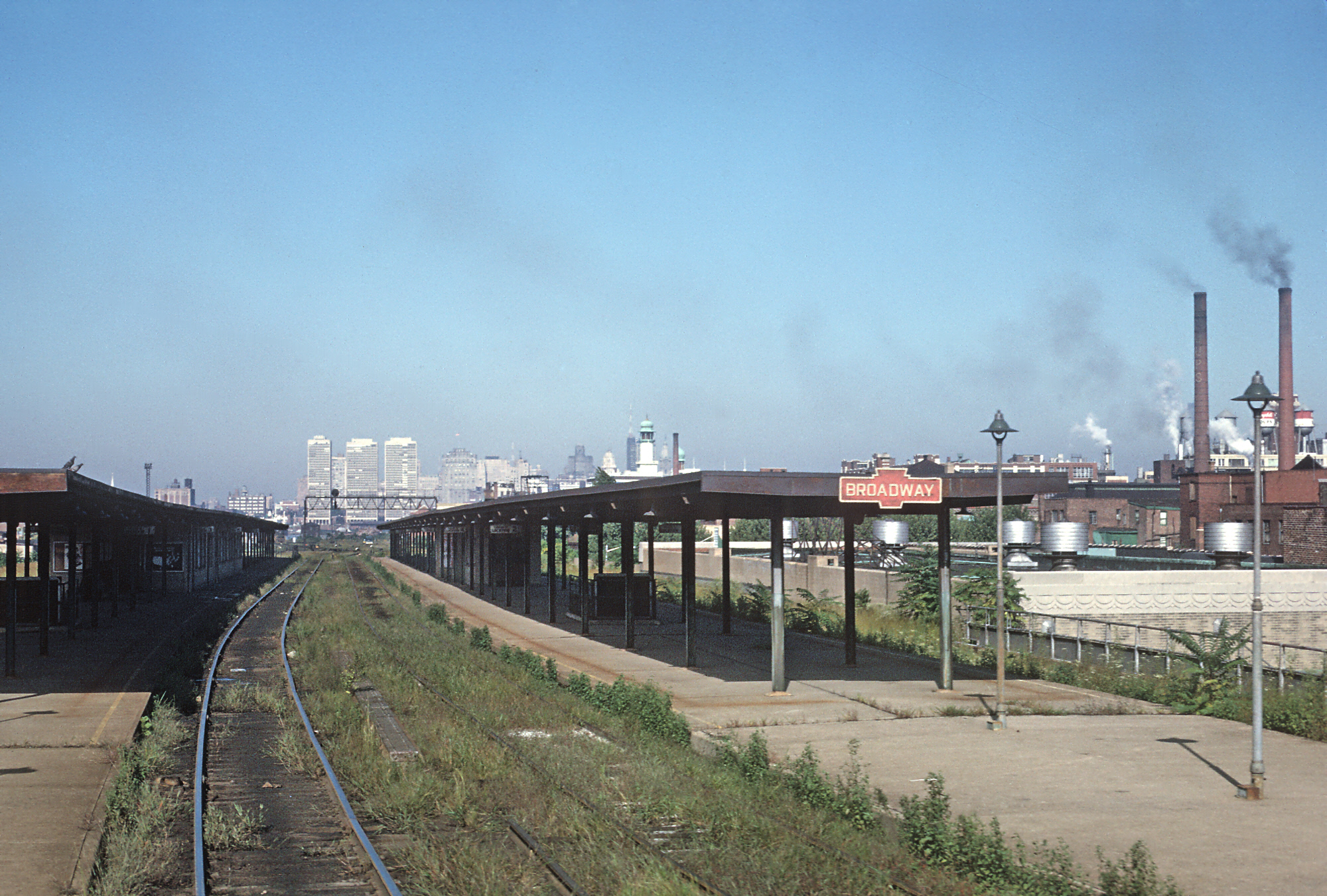
PRSL's Broadway station a few months before the final service into Camden ended on January 14, 1966

Following World War II, the rise of automobile use, the completion of the Atlantic City Expressway, and growing popularity of air travel led to a reduction in rail use. Increased air travel also led some to abandon Atlantic City for more exotic vacation destinations, including Florida. By the late 1960s, the surviving former Camden and Atlantic City Main Line was reduced to a commuter service funded by the New Jersey Department of Transportation (NJDOT) running trains of Budd RDC railcars operating from a small terminal at Lindenwold PATCO station and Atlantic City.

While the P-RSL did not enter bankruptcy, its owners, the Penn Central, successor to the Pennsylvania, did. The Reading filed bankruptcy a few years after the Penn Central. As a result, Conrail took over the P-RSL on April 1, 1976.

== Predecessors ==
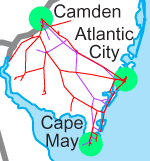
Map showing the predecessors to the PRSL

=== West Jersey and Seashore Railroad ===
Effective May 4, 1896, the Pennsylvania Railroad consolidated all of its railroads and several smaller properties in South Jersey into the West Jersey and Seashore Railroad. The WJ&S had lines coming from its Federal Street Terminal in Camden.

The "Main Line" ran to Atlantic City and to other shore points via Winslow Junction, and its line via Woodbury to Millville. It was electrified with 650 volt DC third rail and overhead lines, with branches going to Salem, and Deep Water Point from Woodbury, and Bridgeton from Glassboro.

While the WJ&S line via Woodbury was a pioneering example of railroad electrification, electric multiple unit (MU) service between Newfield and Atlantic City ended September 26, 1931. The PRSL only inherited the electrified Millville–Camden commuter rail service from WJ&S.

=== Atlantic City Railroad ===
Effective April 1, 1889, the Philadelphia and Reading Railway consolidated all of its railroads in Southern New Jersey into the Atlantic City Railroad (ACRR).

The ACRR, a subsidiary of the Reading Company, had one line from its Kaighn's Point Terminal going to Winslow Junction with lines splitting off to Atlantic City, Ocean City, Wildwood, and Cape May. Branch lines included the Gloucester Branch to Grenloch, and the Willamstown Branch from Willamstown Junction (on the Atlantic City Main) to Mullica Hill to the south, and Atco to the north.

On July 15, 1933, The WJ&S was leased by the ACRR, and changed its name to Pennsylvania-Reading Seashore Lines, as the Consolidation Agreement had decreed.

== Equipment ==
=== Steam ===
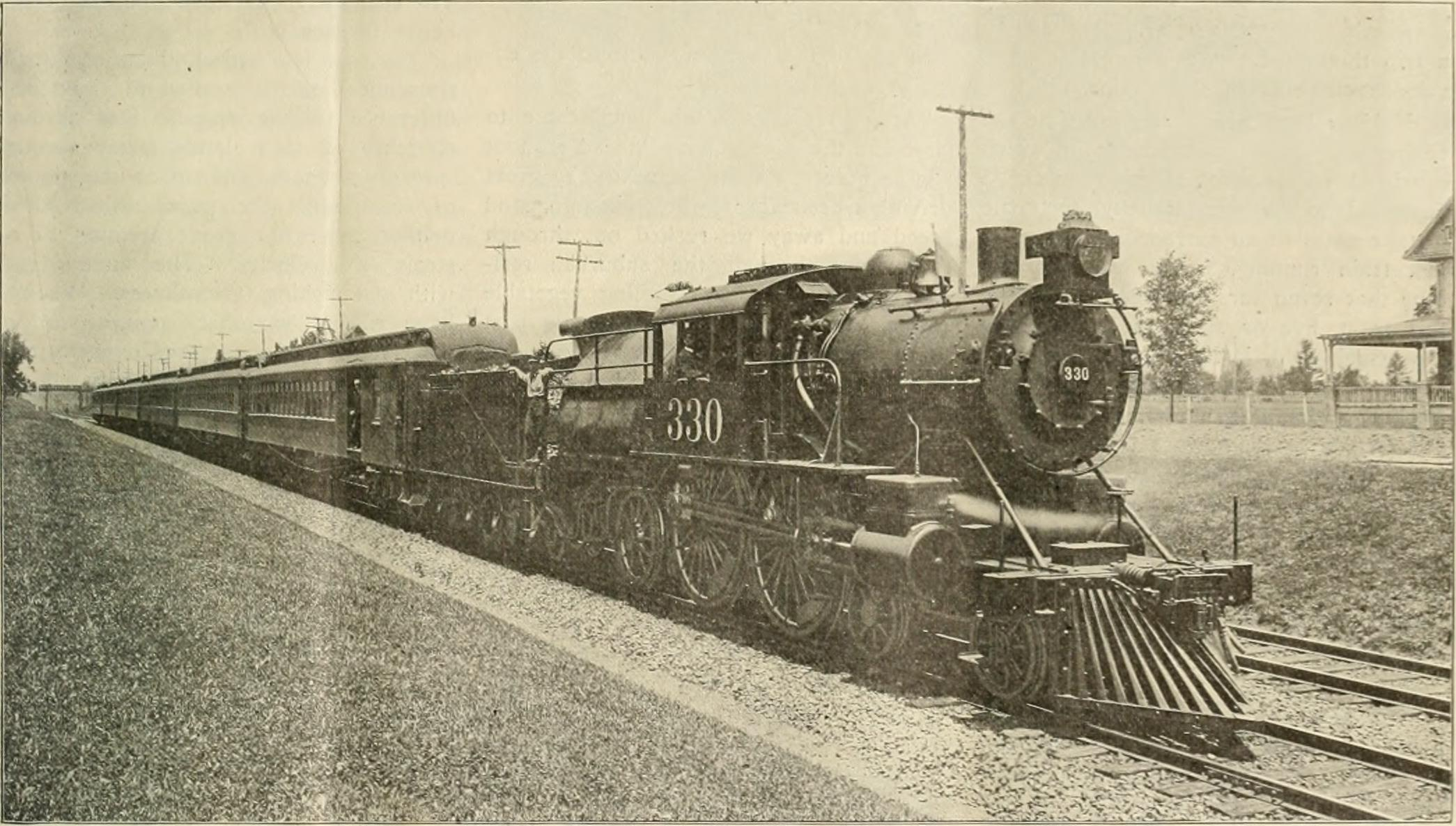
An ACR steam train in 1901

The 21 steam locomotives owned by the PRSL were from the PRR subsidiary WJ&S. They all consisted of PRR classes. Before dieselization the PRSL was more apt to lease its motive power from either of its parent railroads as it completely lacked any heavy passenger locomotives (like 4-6-2 Pacifics). As its parent railroads began to replace steam with diesel locomotives, the PRSL became a haven for steam locomotives during their final years of operation.

==== Class B: 0-6-0 ====
The 0-6-0 type was assigned class B, and was used in switcher service.

- B-6sb
- B8

==== Class E: 4-4-2 ====
The 4-4-2 "Atlantic" type was assigned class E. and was used in passenger service.

- E-3sb
- E6s

==== Class G: 4-6-0 ====
The 4-6-0 "Ten-Wheeler" type was assigned class G. and was used in passenger service.

- G5s

==== Class H: 2-8-0 ====
The 2-8-0 "Consolidation" type was assigned class H, and was used in freight service.

- H-6sb
- H9s
- H10s

==== Class K: 4-6-2 ====
The 4-6-2 "Pacific" type was assigned class K. and was used in passenger service.

- K4s

Since the Consolidation Agreement had decreed that the PRR Mechanical Department would oversee equipment policy decisions, the PRSL did not gain ownership of any ACRR-RDG locomotives.

Additional locomotives were leased as needed from PRSL's parent companies, PRR and RDG.

=== Diesel ===
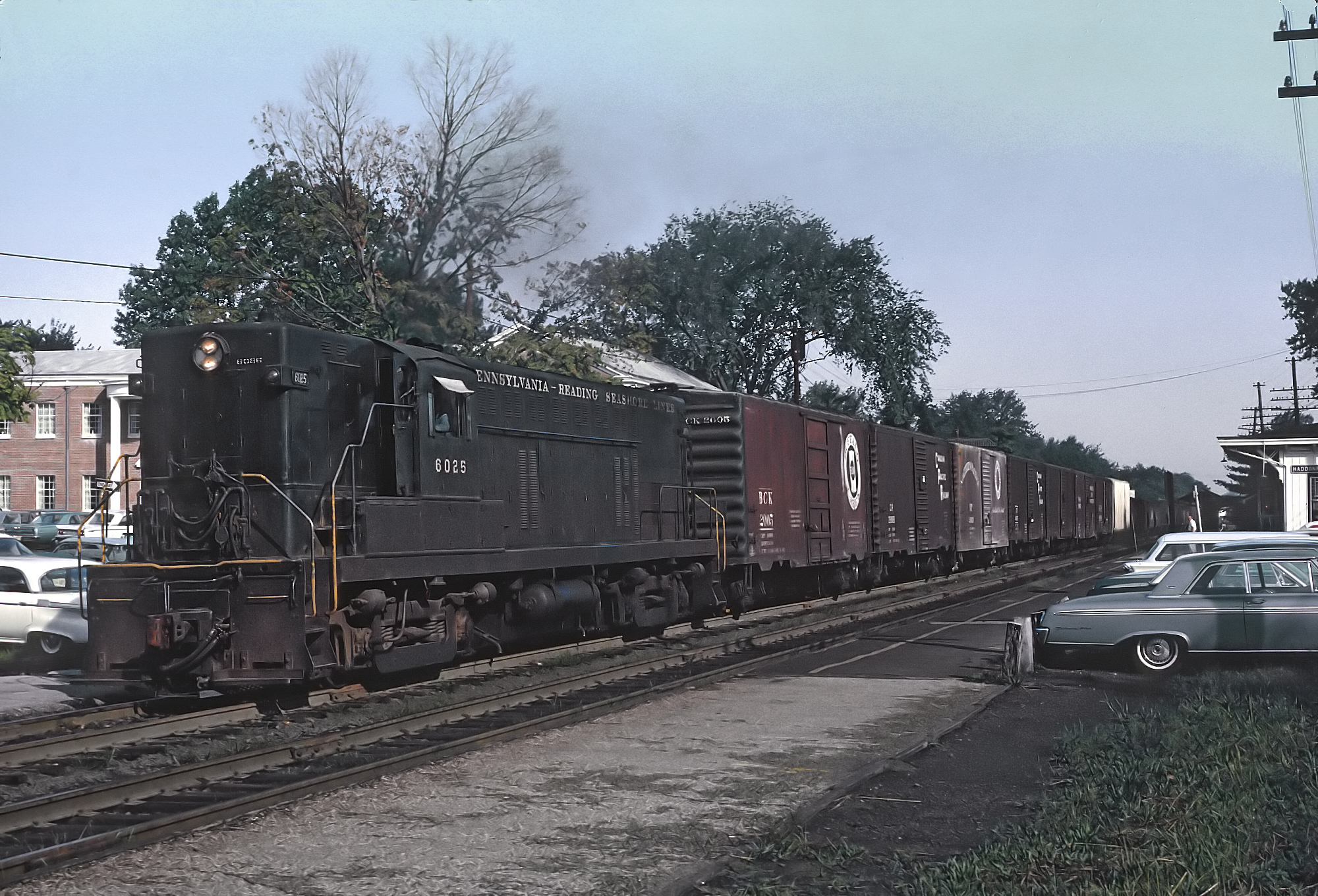
PRSL train led by AS-16 6025 in Haddonfield, New Jersey in 1965

Beginning in the 1950s the PRSL purchased a rather modest fleet of its own diesel locomotives to replace its steam engines for passenger and freight services. When additional power was needed for the busy summer tourist season engines were borrowed from the parent corporations (usually the PRR) as was true previously with the steam locomotives. To further supplement its small fleet the PRSL made increasing use of run through power on certain freight trains to large customers that did not require classification at the PRSL's Pavonia yard.

The first generation of PRSL diesel locomotives were all from the nearby Baldwin Locomotive Works, which was the vendor of choice for the parent PRR in both the steam and early diesel era. The PRSL's diesel locomotives were almost all painted in what is commonly referred to as Brunswick Green which was so dark it seemed almost black. The paint scheme was borrowed from its PRR parent and with the company's official name for this color being DGLE (Dark Green Locomotive Enamel). The undercarriage of the locomotives were painted in black referred to as "True Black."

==== Baldwin Locomotive Works ====
Builder Model designation/PRR Class	Build month/year	Total owned	AAR wheel arrangement	Prime mover	Power output	Road No.
DRS-4-4-1500 / BS-15ms	4/1950	6	B-B	608SC	1,500 hp (1,100 kW)	6000-6005
S-8 / BS-8	5/1951	1	B-B	606	800 hp (600 kW)	6006
AS-16 / BS-16ms	3/1953	10	B-B	608A	1,600 hp (1,200 kW)	6007-6016
S-12 / BS-12	6-7/1953	5	B-B	606A	1,200 hp (890 kW)	6017-6021
AS-16 / BS-16m	3/1953	2	B-B	608A	1,600 hp (1,200 kW)	6022-6023
AS-16 / BS-16ms	11/1953	4	B-B	608A	1,600 hp (1,200 kW)	6024-6027
S-12 / BS-12m	4/1956	6	B-B	606A	1,200 hp (890 kW)	6028-6033

By the late 1960s, the original Baldwin diesels were beginning to suffer reliability problems, which was exacerbated by the fact that Baldwin had gone out of business some 10 years before and could no longer provide spare parts or maintenance. With the new powerplant being constructed at Beesley's Point ready to consume several 90 car coal trains per week the PRSL was in need of more powerful and more reliable locomotives and turned to industry-leader EMD to supply 10 new second generation diesel electric locomotives.

==== General Motors Electro-Motive Division (GM-EMD) ====
Builder Model designation/PRR Class	Build month/year	Total owned	AAR wheel arrangement	Prime mover	Power output	Road No.
GP38 / EF-20A	12/1967	5	B-B	EMD 16-645E	2,000 hp (1.5 MW)	2000–2004
GP38 / EF-20A	3/1969	5	B-B	EMD 16-645E	2,000 hp (1.5 MW)	2005–2009

=== Passenger ===
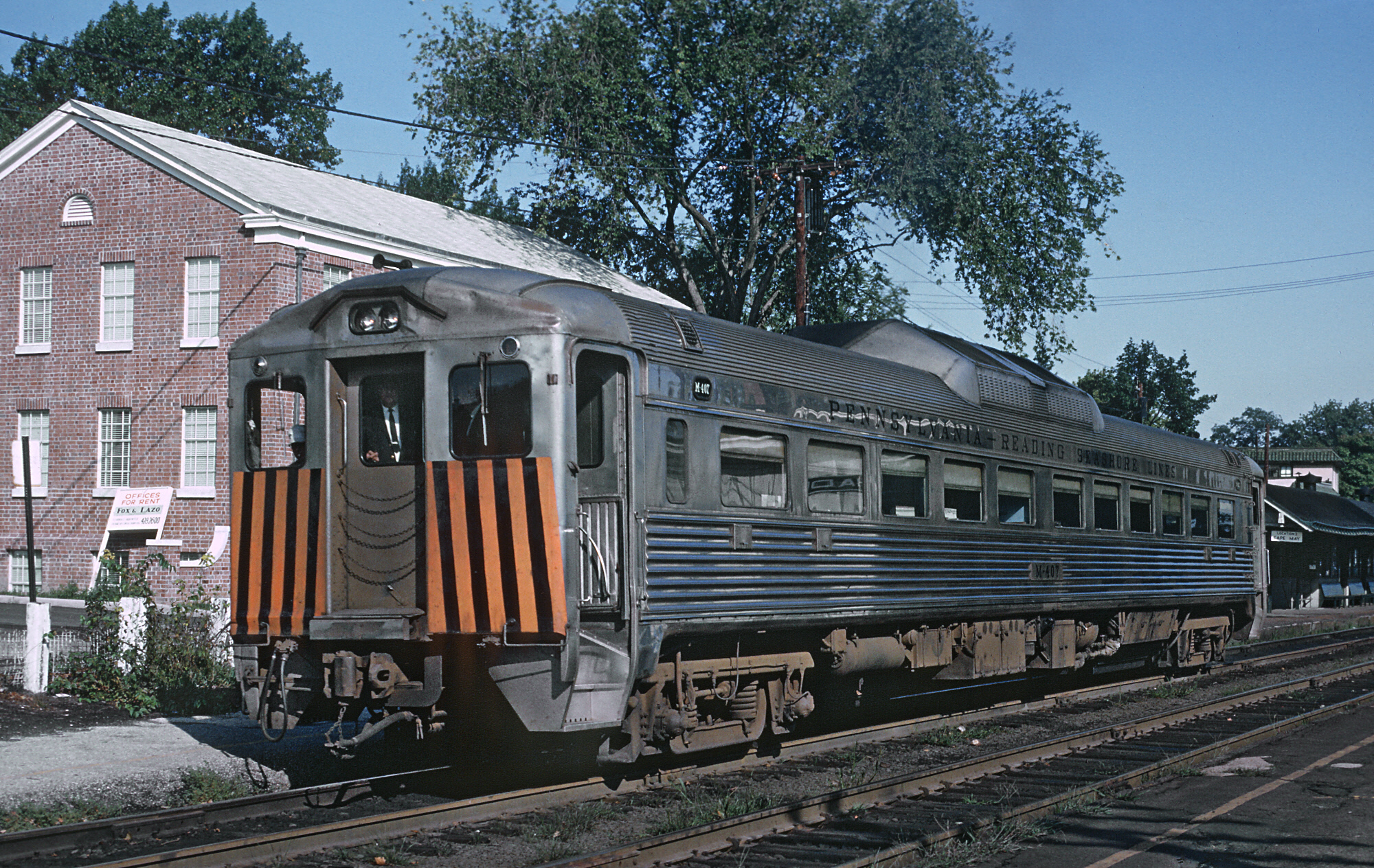
PRSL RDC M407 in Haddonfield, New Jersey in 1965

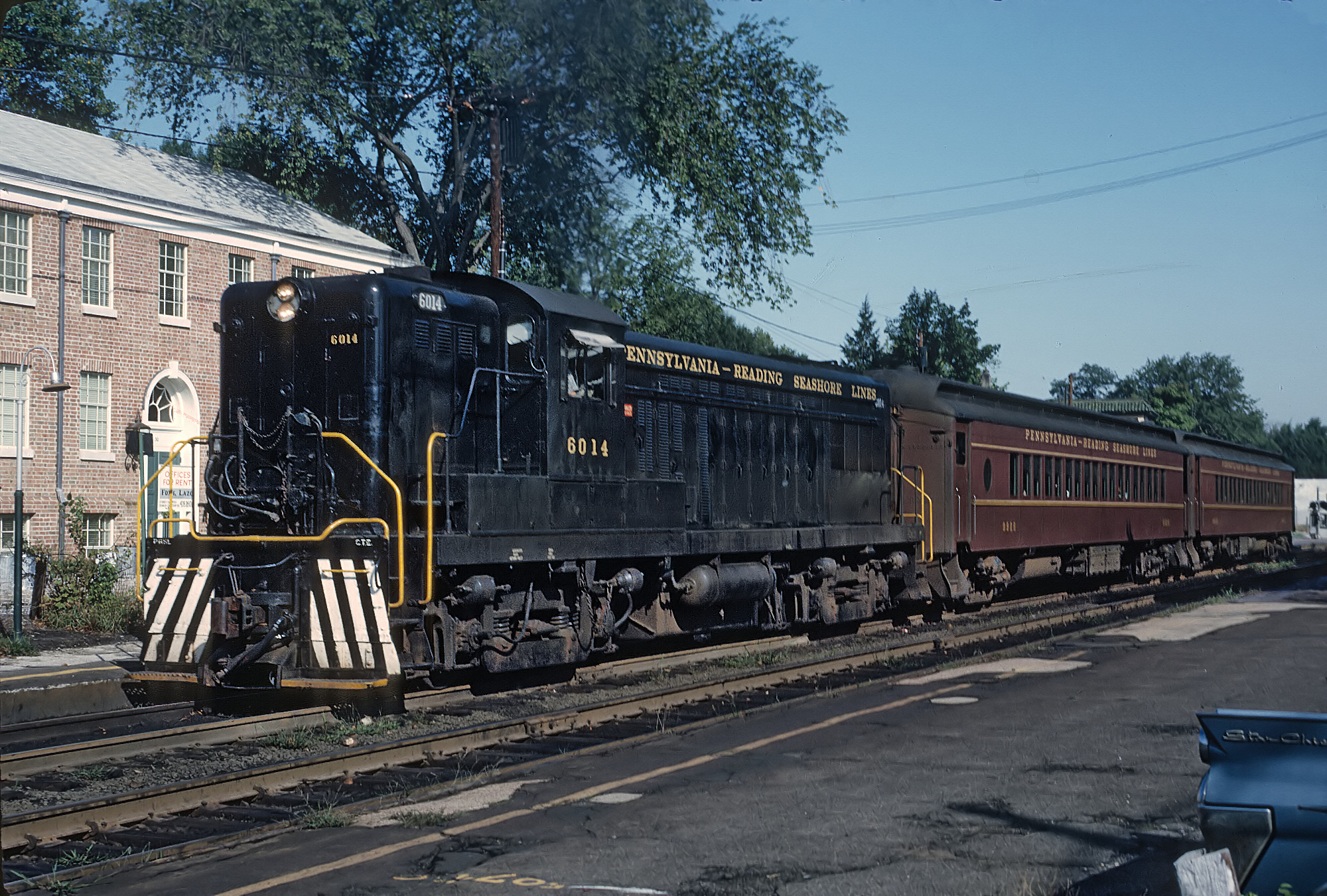
A PRSL passenger train at Haddonfield, September 1965

==== Gas-electric car (Doodlebug) ====
Road Number	PRR Class	Builder	Builder Model	Built month/year	Power output	Note
400	OEW250A	Brill	250A	9/1926	250	†
401	OEG350B	Pullman/Brill	350B	4/1929	350 2x175	‡

==== RDC ====
Model	Note	Built month/year	Total owned	Road Numbers
RDC-1	#	9/1950 - 6/1951	12	M-402 - M-413

PRSL inherited the following from the WJ&S:

- 71 PRR-Type P-70 passenger cars No.'s 9865-9936 (steel, 44 seats)
- 21 PRR-Type PB-70 passenger-combines Cars No.'s 9938-9958 (steel, 40 seats) 9959-9962 (steel, 40 seats)
- 17 various PRR-Type mail and baggage cars No.'s 25 (steel underfame), 6403 (steel), 6428-6438 (steel), 9963-9966 (steel)

Additional passenger cars were leased as needed from PRSL's parent companies, PRR and RDG, and sometimes from the Central Railroad of New Jersey (CNJ).

The PRSL did not own any of the P70s that carried its name. They were leased from the WJ&S. The passenger cars of the PRSL were painted Tuscan Red. This is a brick-colored shade of red.

=== Cabooses ===
Class	Built month/year	Total owned	Road Numbers
ND	??	21	203 - 224
N-5	3/17 - 11/29	22	200 - 202, 225-242
N-11E	9/69	3	250 - 252

== Successor railroads ==
- Cape May Seashore Lines (CMSL)
- Conrail Shared Assets Operations (CSAO)
- New Jersey Transit Rail Operations (NJT) (Atlantic City Line)
- PATCO Speedline (DRPA)
- SMS Rail Service (SMS)
- Southern Railroad of New Jersey (SRNJ)
- Winchester and Western Railroad (WW)

== See also ==
- List of Pennsylvania-Reading Seashore Lines passenger trains
- Atlantic City Railroad
- Atlantic City Express Service
- Central Railroad of New Jersey
- Delair Bridge
- New Jersey Southern Railroad
- PATCO Speedline
- Pennsylvania Railroad
- Reading Company
- Shore Fast Line
- 1922 Winslow Junction Train Derailment
- 1896 Atlantic City rail crash
