= Cloquet Terminal Railroad =

Shortline railroad in Minnesota, U.S.

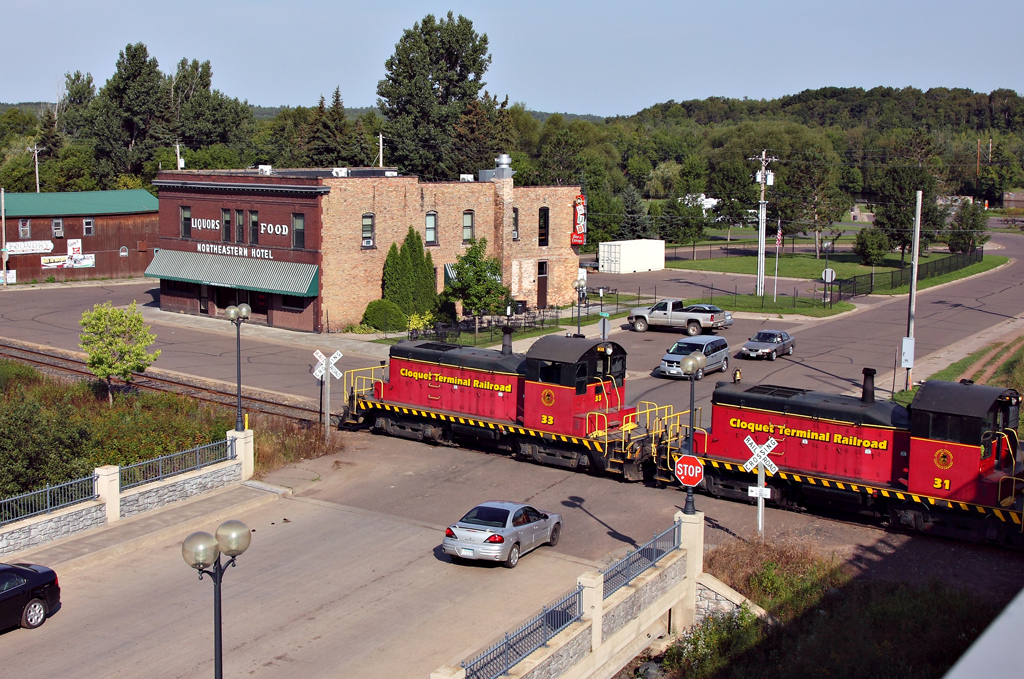
- Cloquet Terminal Railroad in Cloquet, Minnesota

Overview
- Headquarters: Cloquet, Minnesota
- Reporting mark: CTRR
- Locale: Minnesota
- Dates of operation: 2002–

Technical
- Track gauge: 4 ft 8 1/2 in (1,435 mm) standard gauge

Cloquet Terminal Railroad (reporting mark CTRR) is a small Class 3 terminal railroad operating 6 miles (9.7 km) of track in Cloquet, Minnesota. The railroad interchanges with the BNSF Railway and CPKC Railway railroads in Cloquet and services the Sappi Paper Mill, a USG Ceiling Tile plant and a SMI Plant on the mill site. The railroad's shop and offices are located on Dunlap Island in the St. Louis River.

The railroad owns 160 freight cars. In 2004, the railroad handled 6,000 railroad cars.

Cloquet Terminal Railroad is owned by the Sappi Paper Mill and took over the operations of the Duluth and Northeastern Railroad on May 13, 2002. The Duluth & Northeastern, while the last operating logging railroad in Minnesota, had abandoned most of its route in the 1940s and the line between Cloquet and Saginaw, Minnesota in the 1990s.

The Cloquet Terminal Railroad began a cosmetic restoration of Duluth and Northeastern 28 (originally Duluth, Missabe and Iron Range Railway 332), a 2-8-0 steam locomotive, in December 2011. This locomotive previously operated on the Duluth and Northeastern until its retirement in 1964. The railroad determined that the locomotive was in good enough condition for a full restoration, and it was rebuilt at the behest of the Cloquet Terminal's general manager at a cost of $750,000. The rebuilt locomotive was given back to the Lake Superior Railroad Museum; it returned to steam in 2017.
