= Baldwin AS-16 =

Model of diesel-electric locomotive

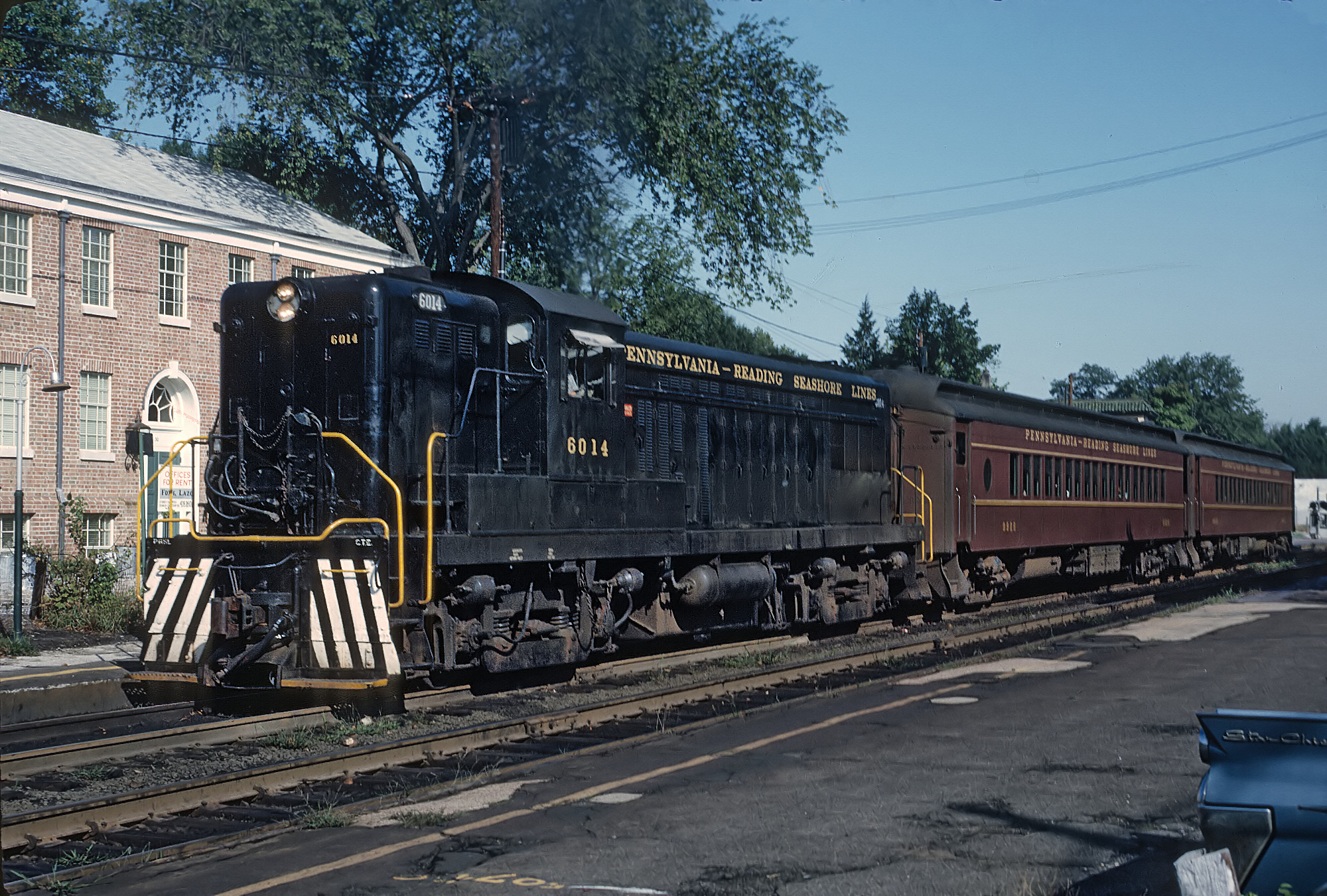
- PRSL AS-16 at Haddonfield station in September 1965
Type and origin
- Power type: Diesel-electric
- Builder: Baldwin Locomotive Works
- Model: AS-16
- Build date: May 1951–February 1956
- Total produced: 127
Specifications
- Configuration
  - AAR: B-B
- Gauge: 4 ft 8 1/2 in (1,435 mm) standard gauge
- Trucks: AAR Type B
- Length
  - Over couplers: 58 ft (18 m)
- Prime mover: 608A
- Aspiration: Turbocharger Elliott Company H704 (125 hp)
- Generator: Westinghouse 471B
- Traction motors: Westinghouse 370DL (4)
- Gear ratio: 15:63, 15:68 (optional) 17:62 (passenger)
- Couplers: AAR Type E knuckle
Performance figures
- Power output: 1,625 hp (1,212 kW) (marketed as 1,600 hp)
Career
- Locale: North America
- Disposition: 1 preserved, remainder scrapped

The BLH AS-16 was a diesel-electric locomotive rated at 1,625 hp (1,212 kW), that rode on two-axle trucks, having a B-B wheel arrangement. It was the successor to Baldwin's DRS-4-4-1500 model, and remained in production until Baldwin-Lima-Hamilton quit the locomotive manufacturing business in 1956.

Nine railroads bought 127 locomotives, with five railroads having bought the previous model. Former Missouri Pacific 4328 was sold to Bethlehem Steel for Iron Mines Co. of Venezuela and was later acquired by Ferrominera Orinoco. Today the locomotive survives on display at the entrance of CVG Ferrominera Orinoco in Guyana City, Venezuela. It is the sole surviving Baldwin AS-16.

== Original buyers ==
Image	Railroad	Quantity	Road numbers	Notes
	Baltimore and Ohio Railroad	16	890–905	Renumbered 6200–6215; renumbered 2241–2239
	Erie Railroad	16	1106–1120, 1140	
	Missouri-Kansas-Texas Railroad	18	1571–1586, 1787–1788	Renumbered
	Missouri Pacific Railroad (International-Great Northern Railroad)	2	4195–4196	
	Missouri Pacific Railroad (St. Louis, Brownsville and Mexico Railway)	6	4326–4331	No. 4328 is sole surviving example. Currently on Display in Venezuela.
	New York, Chicago & St. Louis Railroad ("Nickel Plate Road")	4	320–323	
	Pennsylvania-Reading Seashore Lines	16	6007–6016, 6022–6027	6022–6027 were a cancelled order by the Reading Co., The 6 were built in 1953 with dynamic brakes and conventional mu (as opposed to BLW's air-controlled design). In 1956 the P-RSL acquired the units and had the dynamic brakes removed, BLW air-controlled mu installed, only №'s 6024 to 6027 had steam boilers installed.
	Minneapolis, St. Paul and Sault Ste. Marie Railroad ("Soo Line")	2	379–380	
	Reading Company	43	530–554, 560–563, 576–589	
	Western Maryland Railway	4	173–176	
	Total	127		

== Usage ==
The AS-16 was designed as an all-around useful locomotive, capable of freight or passenger service. The engine had optional benefits such as a steam generator or dynamic brakes. The AAR Type B truck warranted higher speed than its siblings, the AS-416 and AS-616, with their three axle trucks.
