= Soo Line B-4 class =

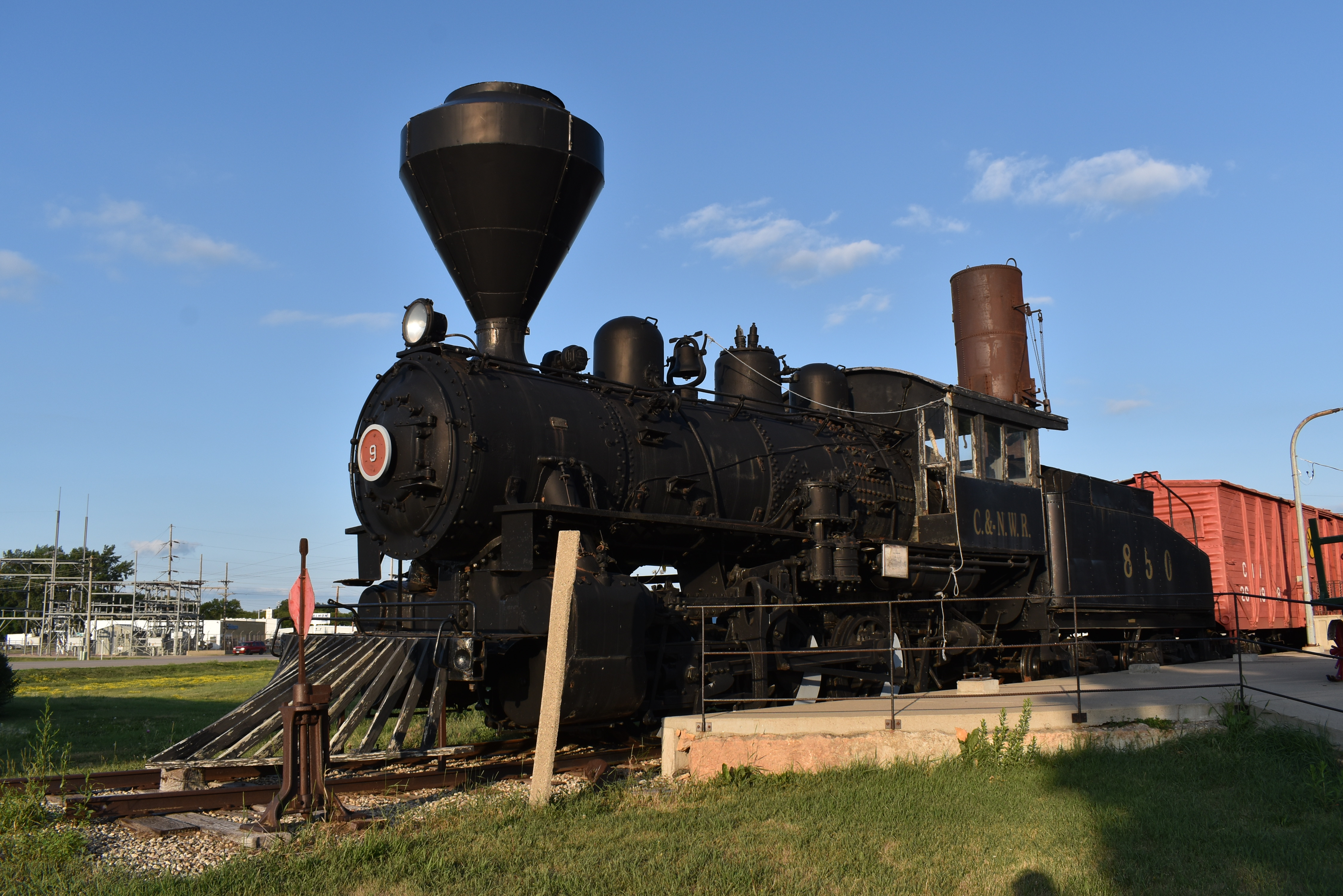
- Soo Line No. 346 locomotive in Tracy, MN
Type and origin
- Power type: Steam
- Builder: American Locomotive Company
- Build date: 1915 (6), 1920 (5)
Specifications
- Configuration
  - Whyte: 0-6-0
  - UIC: C h2
- Gauge: 4 ft 8 1/2 in (1,435 mm)
- Driver dia.: 51 in (1,295 mm)
- Wheelbase: Loco: 11 ft 6 in (3.51 m)
- Length: 58 ft 10 3/8 in (17.94 m)
- Width: 10 ft 5 in (3.18 m)
- Height: 15 ft 3 1/2 in (4.66 m)
- Axle load: 51,500 lb (23.4 tonnes)
- Loco weight: 151,000 lb (68.5 tonnes)
- Tender weight: 102,900 lb (46.7 tonnes)
- Fuel type: Coal
- Fuel capacity: 16,000 lb (7.3 tonnes)
- Water cap.: 5,000 US gal (19,000 L; 4,200 imp gal)
- Boiler pressure: 180 lbf/in^{2} (1.24 MPa)
- Cylinders: Two, outside
- Cylinder size: 20 in × 26 in (508 mm × 660 mm)
- Valve gear: Walschaerts
Performance figures
- Tractive effort: 31,200 lbf (138.78 kN)
Career
- Operators: Minneapolis, St. Paul and Sault Ste. Marie Railway (Soo Line)
- Class: B-4
- Number in class: 11
- Numbers: 344–354
- Preserved: #346; #353
- Disposition: Two preserved, of which one is operational

The Soo Line B-4 class were 0-6-0 steam locomotives constructed for the Minneapolis, St. Paul and Sault Ste. Marie Railway (Soo Line) by the American Locomotive Company. Six (#344–349) were built at their Schenectady plant in 1915, with a further five (#350–354) being constructed by their Brooks plant in Dunkirk, New York, in 1920.

They were the last, and largest design of purpose-built switch engines that the Soo Line owned, any heavier switching duties were performed by down-graded 2-8-0 freight engines. All were still on the active roster in May 1953, but all had been retired by the end December 1954 when the railroad completed its dieselization.

Two are preserved - #346 from the first batch, which is displayed at the Wheels Across the Prairie Museum at Tracy, Minnesota, as Dakota, Minnesota and Eastern #9, and #353 from the second batch, which is operational and gives free rides annually at the Western Minnesota Steam Thresher's Reunion, Rollag, Minnesota.
