= Duluth and Northeastern Railroad =

Logging railroad in Minnesota, U.S.

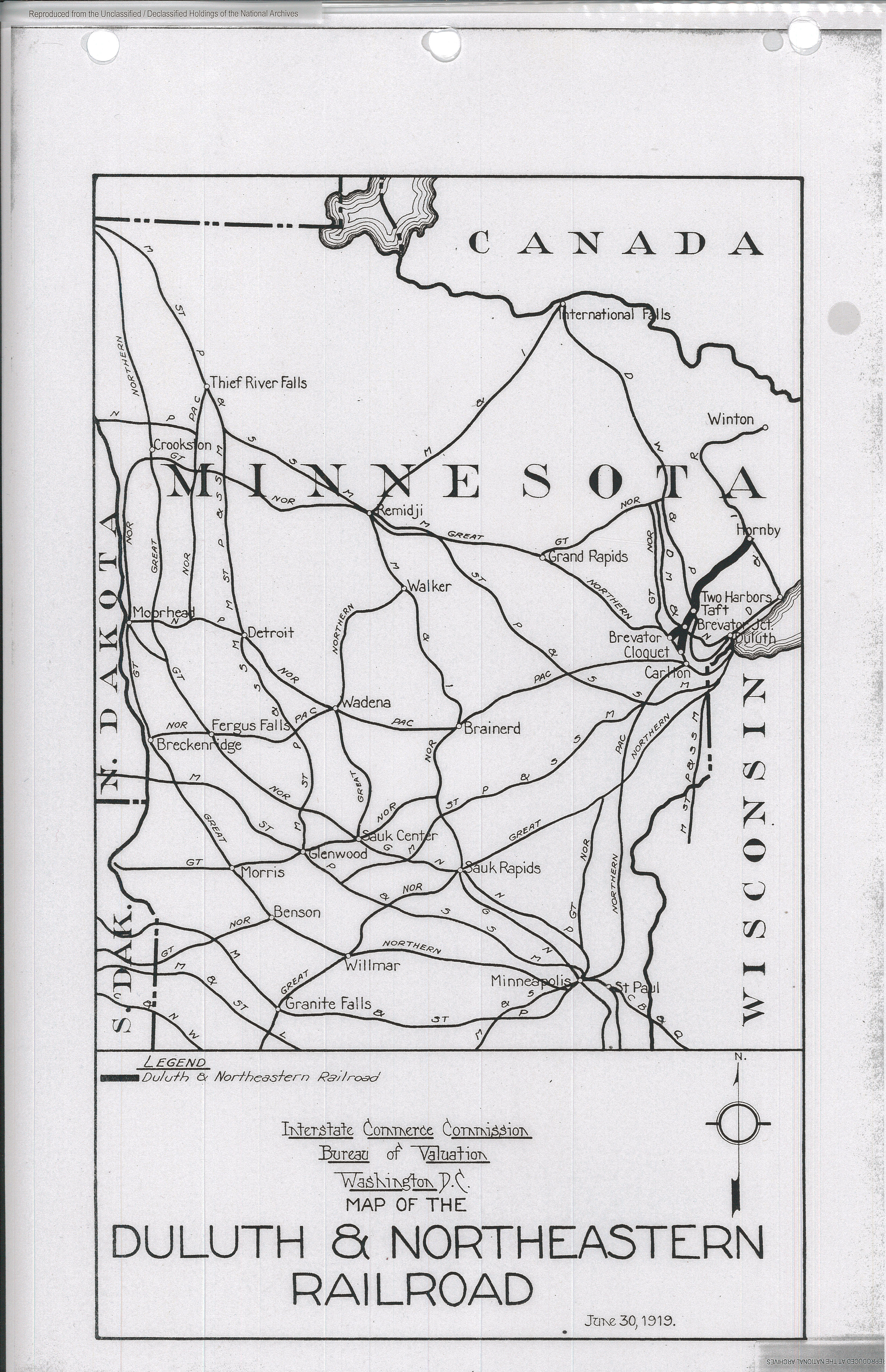
1919 map of the railroad

The Duluth and Northeastern Railroad (DNE) was a logging railroad headquartered in Cloquet, Minnesota. Incorporated on September 30, 1898, the railroad was built through the forests of northeastern Minnesota, eventually reaching its zenith with 75 miles (121 km) of track, including branches extending from Cloquet to Hornby, Minnesota, near today's settlement of Brimson, Minnesota. The railroad interchanged with the Duluth, Missabe and Iron Range Railway at Saginaw, Minnesota.

The railroad was one of the last in Minnesota to dieselize, continuing to operate steam locomotives until 1964. Following dieselization, Duluth & Northeastern 28 continued to make special trips until it was donated to the Lake Superior Railroad Museum in 1974.

In 1941, the railroad was cut back to a 10-mile (16 km) line between Cloquet and Saginaw, Minnesota. This 10-mile line continued to operate until 1991, when the line was again cut back to just the trackage in Cloquet serving the then Potlatch Paper Mill and the USG Ceiling Tile Plant. Potlatch Corporation acquired the railroad in 1964.

In the 1990s, traffic consisted of about 5,000 cars of pulpwood, pulp, paper and related products plus chemicals.

On May 13, 2002, the SAPPI paper mill took over operations of the railroad, the Duluth and Northeastern Railroad ceased, and its successor, the Cloquet Terminal Railroad began.
