= USRA Light Mountain =

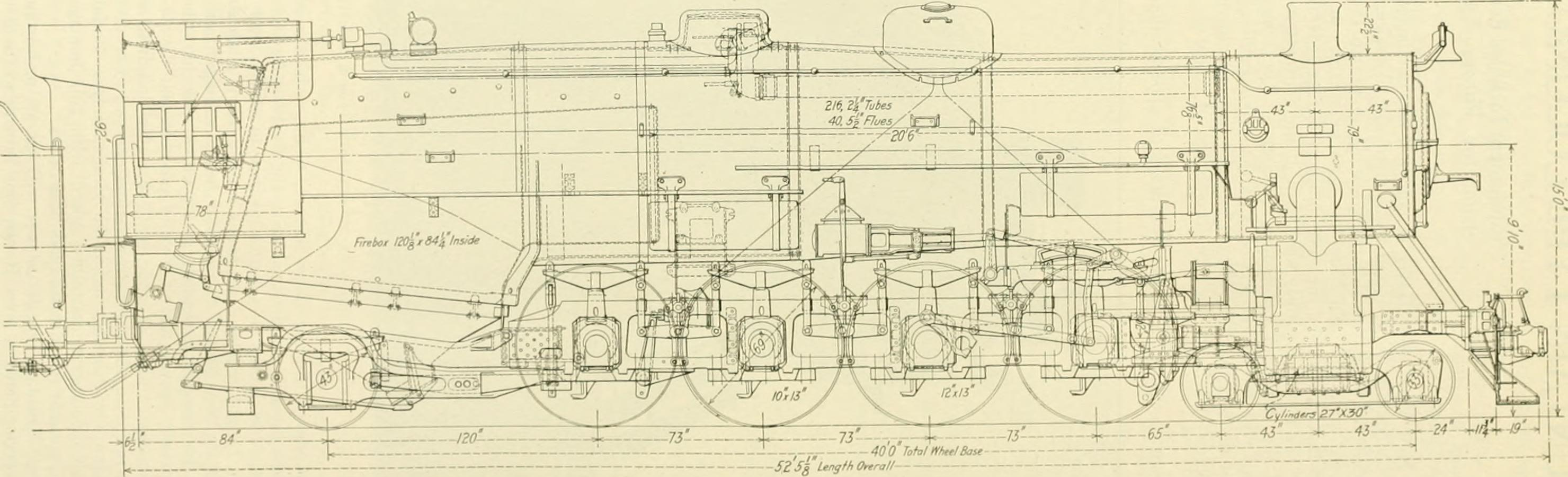
Type and origin
- Power type: Steam
- Builder: American Locomotive Company; Baldwin Locomotive Works
- Build date: 1918-1930
- Total produced: 47 (90 plus copies)
Specifications
- Configuration
  - Whyte: 4-8-2
  - UIC: 2′D1′ h2
- Gauge: 4 ft 8 1/2 in (1,435 mm)
- Driver dia.: 69 in (1,753 mm)
- Wheelbase: Coupled: 18 ft 3 in (5.56 m); Locomotive: 40 ft 0 in (12.19 m); Loco & tender: 75 ft 8 1/2 in (23.08 m)
- Axle load: 55,000 lb (24,900 kg)
- Adhesive weight: 220,000 lb (99,800 kg)
- Loco weight: 320,000 lb (145,100 kg)
- Tender weight: 172,000 lb (78,000 kg)
- Total weight: 492,000 lb (223,200 kg)
- Fuel type: Coal
- Fuel capacity: 32,000 lb (14,500 kg)
- Water cap.: 10,000 US gal (37,900 L; 8,300 imp gal)
- Firebox
  - Grate area: 70.8 sq ft (6.58 m^{2})
- Boiler pressure: 200 psi (1.38 MPa)
- Heating surface
  - Firebox: 329 sq ft (30.6 m^{2})
  - Tubes: 2,598 sq ft (241.4 m^{2})
  - Flues: 1,176 sq ft (109.3 m^{2})
  - Total surface: 4,130 sq ft (384 m^{2})
- Superheater
  - Heating area: 957 sq ft (88.9 m^{2})
- Cylinders: Two
- Cylinder size: 27 in × 30 in (686 mm × 762 mm)
- Valve gear: Baker, then Walschaerts
- Valve type: 14-inch (356 mm) piston valves
Performance figures
- Tractive effort: 53,900 lbf (239.76 kN)
- Factor of adh.: 4.1
Career
- Scrapped: 1943-1959
- Disposition: All scrapped

The USRA Light Mountain was a USRA standard class of steam locomotive designed under the control of the United States Railroad Administration, the nationalized railroad system in the United States during World War I. This was the standard light freight locomotive of the USRA types, and was of 4-8-2 wheel arrangement in the Whyte notation, or 2′D1′ in UIC classification.

A total of 47 locomotives were built under the auspices of the USRA.

== Original owners ==
=== USRA originals ===
Railroad	Quantity	Class	Road numbers	Notes
Missouri Pacific Railroad	7	MT-69	5301–5307	Built 1919 by ALCO. All scrapped, 1943-1947.
Nashville, Chattanooga and St. Louis Railway	5	J1-54	550–554	Built 1919 by ALCO-Richmond. All scrapped, 1945-1949.
New York, New Haven and Hartford Railroad	10	R-1	3300–3309	Built 1919 by ALCO-Schenectady. All scrapped, 1949-1951.
Southern Railway	25	Ts-1	1475–1499	Built 1919 by ALCO. Three to AGS 6692–6694, five to CNOTP 6495–6499. All scrapped, 1950-1955.
Total	47			

=== Copies ===
Railroad	Quantity	Class	Road numbers	Notes
Louisville and Nashville Railroad	22	L-1	400–421	Built 1926-1930 by Baldwin . All Scrapped 1953-1957
Nashville, Chattanooga and St. Louis Railway	8	J1-54	555–562	Built 1922 by Baldwin. All scrapped, 1955-1956.
New York, New Haven and Hartford Railroad	30	R-1-a	3310–3339	Built 1919 by ALCO. All scrapped, 1943-1958.
New York, New Haven and Hartford Railroad	9	R-1-b	3304–3348	Built 1918-1919 by ALCO. All scrapped, 1943-1945.
New York, Ontario and Western Railway				
Minneapolis, St. Paul and Sault Ste. Marie Railroad (Soo Line)	21	N-20	4000–4020	Built 1926-1930 by ALCO and Soo Line. All scrapped, 1944-1959.
Total	90			

None of the originals built by the USRA or any of the subsequent copies were preserved, being scrapped from 1943 to 1959.
