= Baldwin DRS-4-4-1500 =

Type and origin
- Power type: Diesel-electric
- Builder: Baldwin Locomotive Works
- Model: DRS-4-4-1500
- Build date: July 1947–May 1950
- Total produced: 35
Specifications
- Configuration
  - AAR: B-B
  - UIC: Bo′Bo′
- Gauge: 4 ft 8 1/2 in (1,435 mm) standard gauge
- Length: 57 ft 10 3/4 in (17.65 m)
- Height: 14 ft (4.27 m)
- Loco weight: 120 short tons (107 long tons; 109 t)
- Prime mover: Baldwin 608SC
- Engine type: Four-stroke diesel
- Aspiration: Turbocharged
- Displacement: 15,832 cu in (259.44 L)
- Alternator: Westinghouse YG42A
- Generator: Westinghouse 471A
- Traction motors: Westinghouse 370F (4)
- Cylinders: 8
- Cylinder size: 12 3/4 in × 15 1/2 in (324 mm × 394 mm)
- Transmission: Electric
- Loco brake: Straight air
- Train brakes: Air
Performance figures
- Maximum speed: 65 mph (105 km/h)
- Power output: 1,500 hp (1,100 kW)
- Tractive effort: 61,510 lbf (273.61 kN)

The Baldwin DRS-4-4-1500 was a diesel-electric locomotive of the road switcher type rated at 1,500-horsepower (1,100 kW), that rode on two-axle trucks, having a B-B wheel arrangement. It was manufactured by Baldwin Locomotive Works from 1947 until it was replaced in 1950 by the 1,600-horsepower (1,200 kW) AS-16.

Nine railroads bought 35 locomotives, with five railroads later buying the successor model.

Railroad	Quantity	Road numbers	Notes
Erie Railroad	6	1100–1105	
Lehigh Valley Railroad	1	200	
Iron Mines of Venezuela (Bethlehem Steel Company)	3	1–3	
Minneapolis, St. Paul and Sault Ste. Marie Railroad ("Soo Line")	8	360–367	
Missouri Pacific Railroad (St. Louis, Brownsville and Mexico Railway)	4	4112–4115	
New York Central Railroad	2	7300–7301	
Northern Pacific Railway	2	175–176	Renumbered 500–501 to Burlington Northern 405-406
Pennsylvania-Reading Seashore Lines	6	6000–6005	
Western Maryland Railway	3	170–172	
Total	35		
