= Soo Line 353 =

Preserved American 0-6-0 locomotive

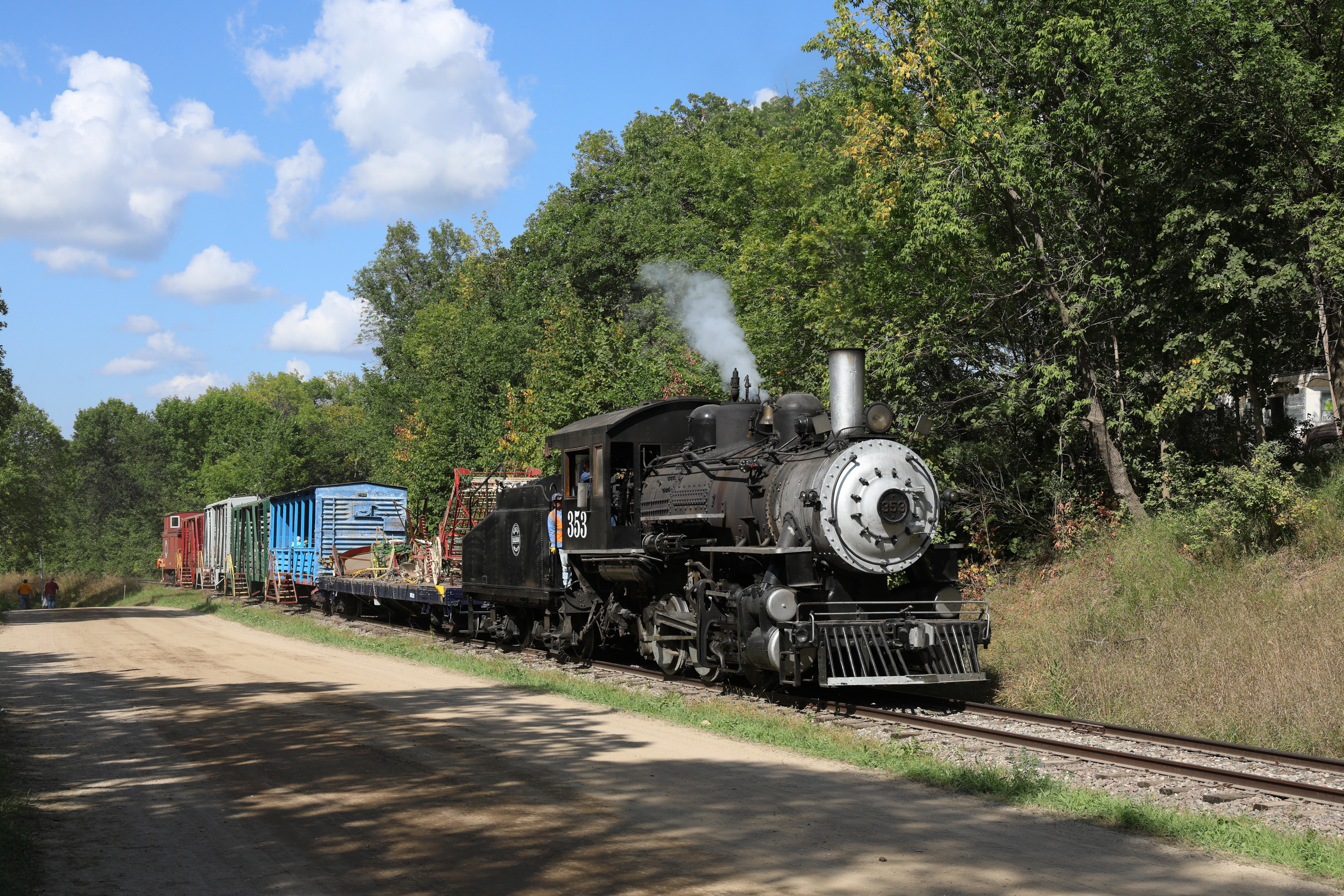
Type and origin
- Power type: Steam
- Builder: American Locomotive Company
- Serial number: 61760
- Build date: August 1920
Specifications
- Configuration
  - Whyte: 0-6-0
  - UIC: C h2
- Gauge: 4 ft 8 1/2 in (1,435 mm)
- Driver dia.: 51 in (1,295 mm)
- Wheelbase: 11 ft 6 in (3.51 m)
- Length: 58 ft 10 3/8 in (17.94 m) (engine and tender)
- Width: 10 ft 0 in (3.05 m)
- Height: 15 ft 3 1/2 in (4.66 m)
- Loco weight: 151,000 lb (68.5 tonnes)
- Total weight: 253,900 lb (115.2 tonnes)
- Fuel type: Coal
- Fuel capacity: 16,000 lb (7.3 tonnes)
- Water cap.: 5,000 US gal (19,000 L; 4,200 imp gal)
- Firebox
  - Grate area: 30.97 sq ft (2.877 m^{2})
- Boiler pressure: 180 lbf/in^{2} (1.24 MPa)
- Heating surface
  - Firebox: 167 sq ft (15.5 m^{2})
  - Flues: 1,382 sq ft (128.4 m^{2})
  - Total surface: 1,644 sq ft (152.7 m^{2})
- Superheater
  - Heating area: 295 sq ft (27.4 m^{2})
- Cylinders: Two, outside
- Cylinder size: 20 in × 26 in (508 mm × 660 mm)
- Valve gear: Walschaerts
Performance figures
- Tractive effort: 31,200 lbf (138.78 kN)
- Factor of adh.: 4.8
Career
- Operators: Minneapolis, St. Paul and Sault Ste. Marie Railway (“Soo Line”); Koppers Coke and Gas Company
- Class: B-4
- Number in class: 10 of 11
- Numbers: 353
- Locale: Wisconsin & Minnesota
- Delivered: August 1920
- Retired: March 1964
- Current owner: WMSTR (Western Minnesota Steam Threshers Reunion)
- Disposition: Operational

Soo Line 353 is a restored 0-6-0 type steam locomotive of the Minneapolis, St. Paul and Sault Ste. Marie Railway (“Soo Line”) B-4 class. It is now owned & operated by WMSTR (Western Minnesota Steam Threshers Reunion) every Labor Day weekend.

== History ==
The locomotive was built by the American Locomotive Company's Brooks Works in 1920 for the Minneapolis, St. Paul and Sault Ste. Marie Railway. It and its other class B-4 locomotives were the last, and largest design of purpose-built switch engines that the Soo Line owned, any heavier switching duties were performed by down-graded 2-8-0 freight engines. By 1954, No. 353 was off the active roster and put on the deadline. In 1955, it and fellow classmate #346 (built by ALCO-Schenectady in 1915) were sold to the Koppers Coke and Gas Company to switch coal hoppers around the coke plant. In March 1964, both the 346 and the 353 were retired from service when the plant bought a second hand Whitcomb 65-ton diesel (formerly owned by the Oliver Iron Mining Company).

In 1965, it was donated to the Minnesota Transportation Museum, where it was stored until 1972 when it was sold to the Western Minnesota Steam Thresher's Reunion, whose volunteers restored it to operation in 1978 for use during their threshing show at Rollag, Minnesota.

== See also ==
- Soo Line 2645
- Duluth and Northeastern 29
- Milwaukee Road 1004
