= List of Pennsylvania-Reading Seashore Lines passenger trains =

The former railroad network Pennsylvania-Reading Seashore Lines operated in New Jersey from 1933, serving Philadelphia, Atlantic City, Camden and Cape May. Timetables were introduced in June 1934 and June 1941.

== Timetables from June 24, 1934 ==
- Boardwalk Flyer - Train #159 (lounge car) dep Camden 3:08 PM, arr Atlantic City 4:05 PM
- Rocket - Train # 165 (lounge car) dep Camden 4:08 PM, arr Atlantic City 5:05 PM
- Quaker City Express - Train # 120 (lounge car) dep Atlantic City 7:10 AM, arr Camden 8:07 AM

== Timetables from June 22, 1941 ==
- Atlantic City Angler – Train # 103 dep Camden 5:23 AM, arr Atlantic City 6:30 AM
- Boardwalk Arrow – Train # 1003 (Buffet Parlor Car) dep Philadelphia 6:45 AM, arr Atlantic City 8:10 AM
- The Flying Eagle – Train # 1007 (Parlor Car) dep Philadelphia 8:50 AM, arr Atlantic City 10:15 AM
- The Flying Cloud – Train # 1009 (Parlor Car) dep Philadelphia 9:50 AM, arr Atlantic City 11:10 AM
- The Sea Lion – Train # 1011 (Parlor Car) dep Philadelphia 10:50 AM, arr Atlantic City 12:15 PM
- The Pilot - Train # 1019 (Parlor Car) dep Philadelphia 11:15 AM, arr Atlantic City 12:35 PM
- The Ozone – Train # 1013 or 1023 (Parlor Car) dep Philadelphia 11:55 AM, arr Atlantic City 1:15 PM
- The Shore Queen – Train # 1015 (Parlor Car) dep Philadelphia 12:55, arr Atlantic City 2:15 PM
- The Jolly Tar – Train # 1017 (Parlor Car) dep Philadelphia 1:50 PM, arr Atlantic City 3:10 PM
- The Boardwalk Flyer – Train # 159 (Lounge Car) dep Camden 3:08 PM, arr Atlantic City 4:00 PM
- Seashore Limited - Train # 1021 dep Philadelphia 3:30 PM, arr Atlantic City 4:55 PM (Parlor Car Daily, Buffet Parlor Car from North Philadelphia weekdays except Fridays and Sats.)
- Barnacle Bill Special – Train # 165 or 167 (Lounge Car) dep Camden 4:08 PM, arr Atlantic City 5:05 PM
- The Cruiser - Train # 1025 (Sleeper as parlor) dep Philadelphia 4:25 PM, arr Atlantic City 5:50 PM
- The Sea Hawk – Train # 1027 (Parlor Car) dep Philadelphia 6:50 PM, arr Atlantic City 8:10 PM
- The Twilight - Train # 1031 (Parlor Car) dep Philadelphia 8:45, arr Atlantic City 10:05 PM
- The Honeymooner – Train # 1033 (Parlor Car) dep Philadelphia 10:45 PM, arr Atlantic City 12:10 AM (night)
- The Skipper – Train # 1002 dep Atlantic City 6:00 AM, arr Philadelphia 7:21 AM
- Barnacle Bill Special – Train # 116 (Lounge Car) dep Atlantic City 6:40 AM, arr Camden 7:37 AM
- The Cruiser – Train # 1004 (Parlor Car) dep Atlantic City 6:45 AM, arr Philadelphia 8:05 AM.
- The Dolphin – Train # 1006 (Parlor Car) dep Atlantic City 7:30 AM, arr Philadelphia 8:53 AM
- The Sea Hawk – Train # 1010 (Parlor Car) dep Atlantic City 8:40 AM, arr Philadelphia 10:00 AM
- The Navigator” – Train # 1012 (Sleeper as Parlor) dep 10:35 AM, arr Philadelphia 12:05 PM
- Seashore Limited – Train # 1016 dep Atlantic City 12:45 PM, arr Philadelphia 2:10 PM (Parlor Car Daily, Buffet Parlor Car to North Philadelphia weekdays)
- The Beach Patrol – Train # 1020 (Parlor Car) dep Atlantic City 3:45 PM, arr Philadelphia 5:10 PM
- The Flying Cloud – Train # 1024 (Parlor Car) dep Atlantic City 4:40 PM, arr Philadelphia 6:05 PM
- The Flying Eagle – Train # 1026 (Parlor Car) dep Atlantic City 5:40 PM, arr Philadelphia 7:03 PM
- The Ocean Wave - Train # 1028 (Parlor Car) dep Atlantic City 6:45 PM, arr Philadelphia 8:09 PM
- The Sea Gull – Train # 1032 (Parlor Car – Buffet service) dep Atlantic City 7:50 PM, arr Philadelphia 9:15 PM
- Boardwalk Arrow – Train # 1034 (Parlor Car) dep Atlantic City 8:40 PM, arr Philadelphia 10:00 PM
- The Sea Lion – Train # 1036 (Parlor Car Sundays and holidays) dep Atlantic City 9:40 PM, arr Philadelphia 11:03
- The Sand Piper – Train # 1038 (Parlor Car) dep 10:40 PM, arr Philadelphia 12:02 AM (night)

=== To/from Cape May County Resorts ===
(Cape May Court House, Wildwood, Cape May Harbor, and Cape May; Stone Harbor and Avalon by connecting bus at Cape May Court House)

- Fishermen's Special – Train # 485 (Sundays & holidays) dep Camden 5:08 AM, arr Cape May Harbor 6:40 AM
- Fishermen's Special – Train # 425 (other days) dep Camden 6:08 AM, arr Cape May Harbor 7:40 AM
- The Resorter – Train # 1053, dep Philadelphia 8:25 AM, arr Wildwood Crest 10:34, arr Cape May 10:32
- The Resorter – Train # 1060, dep Cape May 2:50 PM, dep Wildwood Crest 2:47 PM, arr Philadelphia 4:59 PM
- Fishermen's Special – Train # 486 or 430 dep Cape May Harbor 3:50 PM, arr Camden 5:22 PM
