= Soo Line 1003 =

Preserved American 2-8-2 locomotive

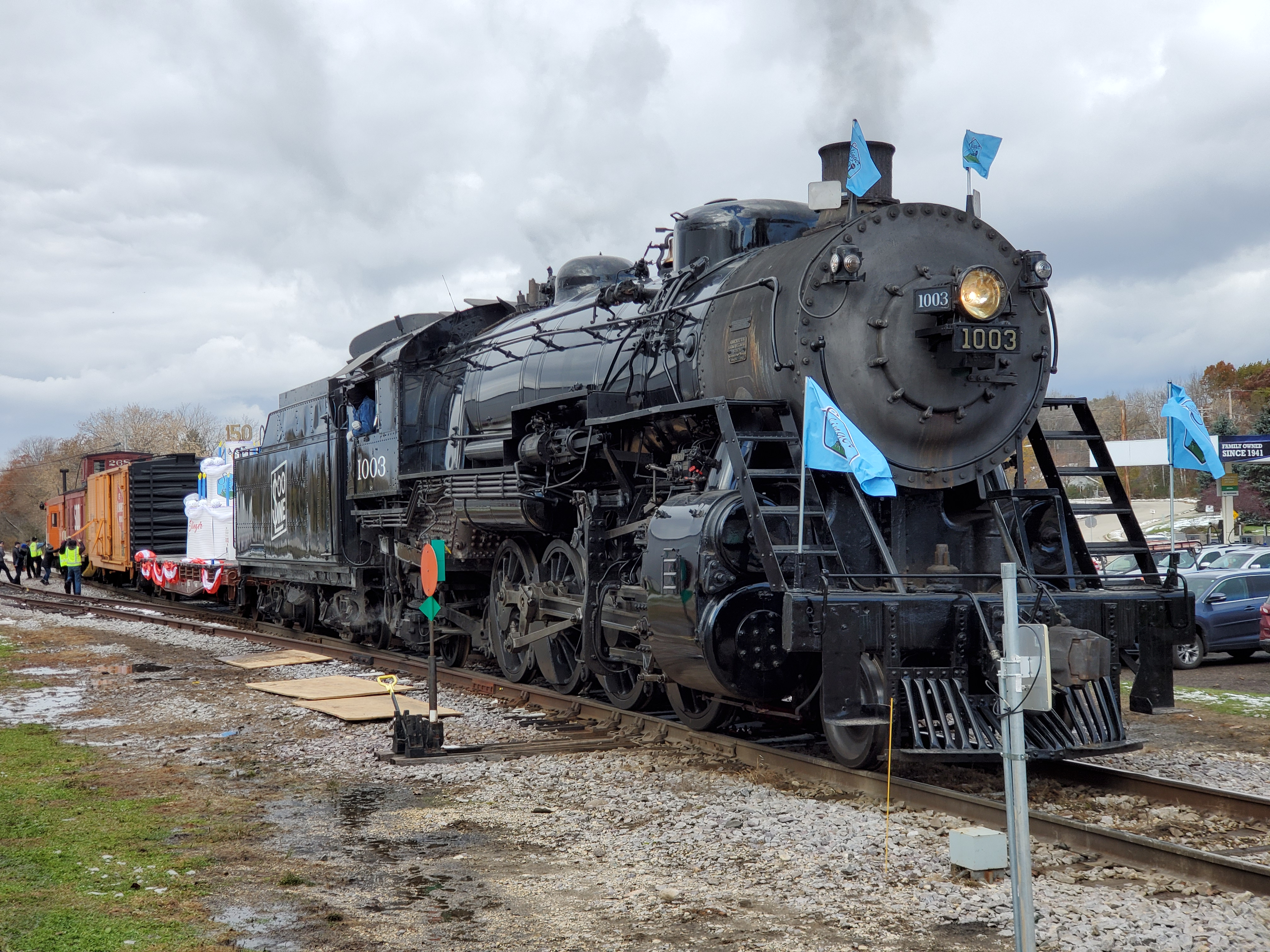
- Soo Line No. 1003 operating in Slinger, Wisconsin, on November 2, 2019.
Type and origin
- Power type: Steam
- Builder: American Locomotive Company
- Serial number: 52826
- Build date: March 1913
- Rebuild date: November 1941
Specifications
- Configuration
  - Whyte: 2-8-2
  - UIC: 1′D1′ h2
- Gauge: 4 ft 8 1/2 in (1,435 mm) standard gauge
- Leading dia.: 33 in (838 mm)
- Driver dia.: 63 in (1,600 mm)
- Trailing dia.: 42 in (1,067 mm)
- Loco weight: 290,000 lb (131,500 kg; 131.5 t)
- Fuel type: Coal
- Fuel capacity: 35,000 lb (15,900 kg; 15.9 t)
- Water cap.: 10,000 US gal (38,000 L; 8,300 imp gal)
- Boiler pressure: 170 lbf/in^{2} (1.17 MPa)
- Cylinders: Two, outside
- Cylinder size: 28 in × 30 in (711 mm × 762 mm)
- Valve gear: Inverted Walschaerts
- Valve type: Piston valves
- Loco brake: Air
- Train brakes: Air
- Couplers: Knuckle
Performance figures
- Maximum speed: 50 mph (80 km/h)
- Tractive effort: 53,947 lbf (239.97 kN)
- Factor of adh.: 4.15
Career
- Operators: Minneapolis, St. Paul and Sault Ste. Marie Railroad; Steam Locomotive Heritage Association
- Class: L-1
- Number in class: 3rd of 10
- Numbers: SOO 1003
- Retired: August 1959
- Preserved: December 30, 1959
- Restored: October 27, 1996
- Current owner: Steam Locomotive Heritage Association
- Disposition: Operational

Soo Line 1003 is a L-1 class 2-8-2 "Mikado" type steam locomotive, built by the American Locomotive Company (ALCO) in March 1913 as a member of the Minneapolis, St. Paul and Sault Ste. Marie Railroad ("Soo Line") L-1 class. It was retired from regular revenue service in August 1959 and restored to operating condition on October 27, 1996. Today, it is occasionally operated on the major railroads of the American Upper Midwest.

== History ==
=== Revenue service ===
The locomotive was built in 1913 by the American Locomotive Company (ALCO) as a L-1 class 2-8-2 “Mikado” type steam locomotive. A very efficient locomotive design, the design enabled the L-1 class to pull passenger and freight trains. In November 1941, some major repairs and replacement parts were carried out on the locomotive. A larger sandbox was installed, the wooden pilot was swapped out with a new boiler tube steel pilot, and the wood and canvas roof was swapped out for steel and the cab became bigger.

The last improvement was that a feed water heater was installed and the superheater itself was replaced with a Elesco type A. No. 1003 was used by the Soo Line mostly to pull freight trains until 1954, when it was placed into standby service at the Gladstone, Michigan roundhouse as part of the railroad's strategic reserve. No. 1003 was retired from revenue service in August 1959 and put in to storage.

On December 30, 1959, the railroad donated the locomotive to the city of Superior, Wisconsin where it was put on public display. In the mid 1970s, Superior Shortline Steam Railroad Ltd. was organized to restore the locomotive to operation, however, the plan of restoring the locomotive to operating condition never came to fruition.

=== Excursion service ===
The locomotive was sold partially disassembled in 1993 to Wisconsin Railway Preservation Trust (WRPT), another organization whose goal was to return the locomotive to operations. WRPT raised $250,000 for the locomotive's restoration. It was originally hoped that the locomotive could be used for excursion trips on the weekend of October 5, 1996, but boiler tests showed the engine to not be ready in time.

No. 1003's first run after restoration under its own power occurred on October 27, 1996, when it steamed up the Duluth, Missabe and Iron Range Railway's Proctor Hill. It performed a few more test runs before its first public excursions on November 10 and 11. In 1998, it ran a triple-header excursion with Northern Pacific 328 and Soo Line 2719, during SteamFest '98.

In 2000 and 2001, No. 1003 pulled excursion trains on the Wisconsin and Southern Railroad (WSOR). In July 2002, No. 1003 lead that year's Circus World Museum (CWM) train on the WSOR from Baraboo to Milwaukee, Wisconsin.

The locomotive made its final journey under its FRA-mandated 15-year boiler certificate on November 13, 2010. But shortly afterwards, the operators raised funds to have the engine overhauled and certified for another 15 years of operation. No. 1003 returned to service in September 2012.

In November 2018, No. 1003 hauled the annual Christmas train for several days.

In August 2022, the engine made a round trip to Chicago for the Metra Family Days event at the commuter operator’s Western Avenue railyard. Several months later in November, the locomotive ran a Trains Magazine photo charter event through central Wisconsin.

On November 11, 2023, the locomotive celebrated its 110th birthday where it ran the Santa Train on a short run from the Wisconsin Automotive Museum to Hartford and placed on display during the Mainstreet’s Christmas Parade; the following day, it ran a private photo freight from Fairwater and return to Hartford, in partnership with Steel Highway Magazine and Brodie Photography.

On November 2–3, 2024, No. 1003 ran a two-day photo charter for Ethan Brodie and Brodie Photography. Six days later on November 9, No. 1003 hauled the annual Santa Train to precede of the Wisconsin's Christmas Parade.

On August 23, 2025, No. 1003 ran a photo charter special from Hartford to Burnett for the 75th anniversary of the Wisconsin Chapter of the National Railway Historical Society. On November 8, Bank Five Nine offered its assistance to No. 1003 for the Santa Train event with a donation of $2,500.

On April 3, 2026, it was announced that new volunteers and crew members had joined the Steam Locomotive Heritage Association to help maintain and operate No. 1003.

In 2027, the locomotive is scheduled to be removed from service for its Federal Railroad Administration (FRA) 1,472-day inspection and overhaul.

== See also ==
- Chicago and North Western 1385
- Soo Line 2713
- Soo Line 2718
- Union Pacific 618

== Bibliography ==
- Suprey, Leslie V. (1962). Steam trains of the Soo. B & W Printers & Publishers. ISBN 978-1-1121-2962-9.
- Gilchinski, Steve (February 1997). "Soo Line 2-8-2 back in steam". Trains magazine. Vol. 57, no. 2. pp. 24–25.
- Nelson, Bruce (2013). America's Greatest Circus Train (1st ed.). Heimburger House Publishing Company. ISBN 978-0-911581-64-5.
