= Soo Line L-1 class =

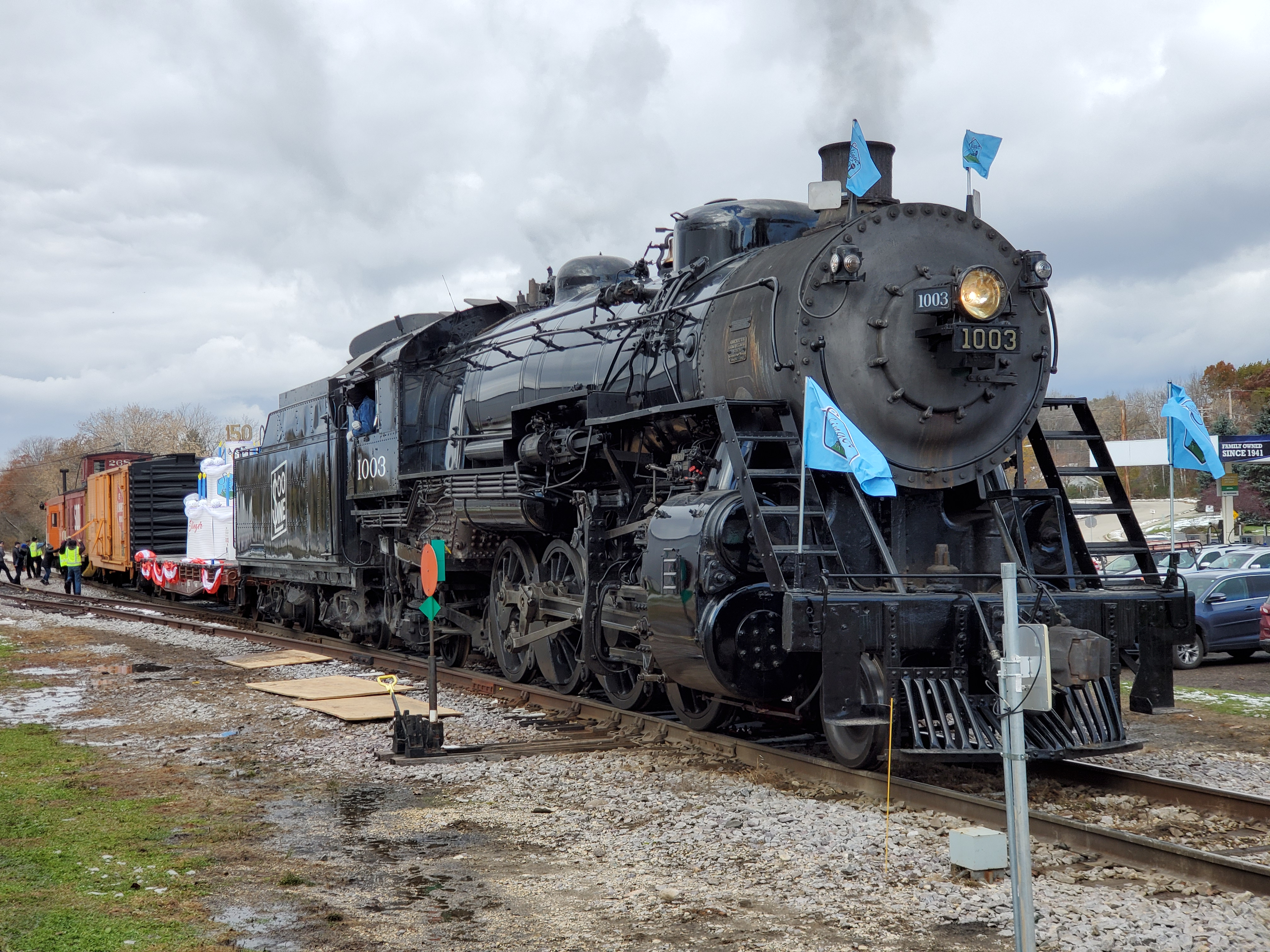
- Soo Line 1003, a restored L-1 class 2-8-2, operating in Slinger, Wisconsin, on November 2, 2019
Type and origin
- Power type: Steam
- Builder: American Locomotive Company, Schenectady, New York
- Order number: Alco: S-934
- Serial number: 52824–52833
- Build date: 1913
- Total produced: 10
Specifications
- Configuration
  - Whyte: 2-8-2
  - UIC: 1′D1′ h2
- Gauge: 4 ft 8 1/2 in (1,435 mm)
- Leading dia.: 33 in (838 mm)
- Driver dia.: 63 in (1,600 mm)
- Trailing dia.: 42 in (1,067 mm)
- Wheelbase: Loco: 35 ft 10 in (10.92 m); Loco & tender: 71 ft 3.5 in (21.73 m)
- Length: 82 ft 6 in (25.15 m)
- Width: 10 ft 5 in (3.18 m)
- Height: 15 ft 5.375 in (4.71 m)
- Axle load: 58,200 lb (26.4 metric tons)
- Adhesive weight: 223,800 lb (101.5 metric tons)
- Loco weight: 297,600 lb (135.0 metric tons)
- Tender weight: 195,500 lb (88.7 metric tons)
- Fuel type: Coal
- Fuel capacity: 35,000 lb (15.9 metric tons)
- Water cap.: 10,000 US gal (38,000 L; 8,300 imp gal)
- Boiler pressure: 170 lbf/in^{2} (1.17 MPa)
- Cylinders: Two, outside
- Cylinder size: 28 in × 30 in (711 mm × 762 mm)
- Valve gear: Walschaerts
Performance figures
- Tractive effort: 53,940 lbf (239.94 kN)
Career
- Operators: Minneapolis, St. Paul and Sault Ste. Marie Railway (“Soo Line”)
- Class: L-1
- Numbers: 1001–1010
- Preserved: #1003
- Disposition: One preserved, remainder scrapped

The Soo Line L-1 class was a class of ten 2-8-2 (Mikado) steam locomotives built by the American Locomotive Company in 1913 for the Minneapolis, St. Paul and Sault Ste. Marie Railway (“Soo Line”).

== Background ==
Having acquired America's first Mikado (2-8-2) type when it merged the Bismarck, Great Falls and Washburn Railway in 1904, it was eight years before the Soo Line ordered a 2-8-2 of its own. Ten locomotives were ordered from the American Locomotive Company, and built by their Schenectady, New York plant in 1913.

== Service ==
The L-1 class were used for powering time freights system wide on both the Minneapolis, St. Paul and Sault Ste. Marie, and Wisconsin Central. They were assisted in that role by the 1920 arrival of the 25 L-2 and L-20 class Mikados in 1920, but were bumped into lesser roles with the arrival of the 21 N-20 class 4-8-2 Mountains in 1926–1930. The 1938 delivery of four O-20 class 4-8-4 Northern made little difference to the L-1 class since the former were restricted to the Chicago–Twin Cities route.

They were a long-lived class, with only one, the 1004, being retired prior to May 1953. By December 1954, however, the Soo Line was effectively dieselized. One locomotive, the 1003, was placed in the strategic reserve, and stored serviceable in the Gladstone, Michigan roundhouse. The other eight remaining L-1s were sold for scrap.

The reserve was never called into action, and the 1003 was donated to the City of Superior, Wisconsin, in December 1959. It was later restored to steam in 1996. No. 1003 has run steam excursions in Duluth, Minnesota, on The Osceola and St. Croix Valley Railroad with cousin Soo Line 2719 and Northern Pacific 328 in 1998, the Wisconsin Central before merging with the Canadian National in 2001, also making an excursions in the early 2000s on the Wisconsin Southern Railroad. On August 11 to 13th, 2017, No. 1003 made a rare, first-time trek to Chicago, Illinois, via the Canadian National, Wisconsin Southern, Metra, and Canadian Pacific lines, making a special appearance at Galewood Metra station to benefit the Shriners Hospital for Children.
