= Ashland station (Soo Line) =

Historic rail station

Ashland
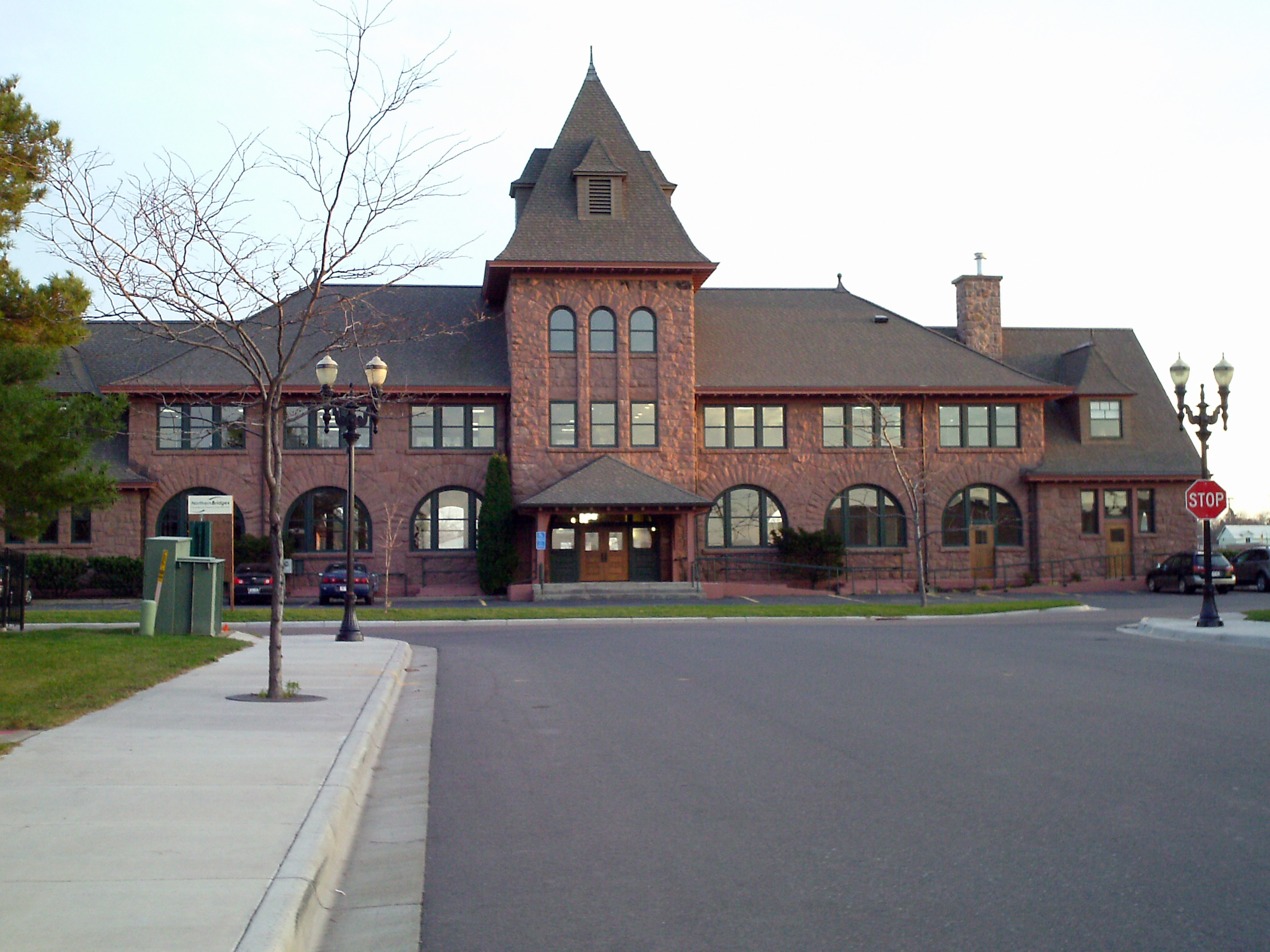
- Soo Line Depot in Ashland

General information
- Location: 320 Depot Dr, Ashland, Wisconsin 54806
- System: Former Soo Line passenger rail station

History
- Opened: 1889
- Closed: January 6, 1959

Services
Preceding station	Soo Line	Following station
Terminus	Spencer – Ashland	Marengo toward Spencer
- Soo Line Depot
- U.S. National Register of Historic Places
- Location within Wisconsin Location within the United States
- Location: 3rd Ave., W., at 4th St., Ashland, Wisconsin
- Coordinates: 46°35′20″N 90°53′03″W
- Area: less than one acre
- Built: 1889
- Architect: Wisconsin Central Railroad
- Architectural style: Richardsonian Romanesque
- NRHP reference No.: 88002177
- Added to NRHP: November 3, 1988
Location

The Ashland station or Soo Line Depot in Ashland, Wisconsin, United States, was listed on the National Register of Historic Places in 1988. It is a brownstone building and was used by the Wisconsin Central and later by the Soo Line Railroad.

Passenger train service to the Soo Line Depot ended on January 6, 1959, when trains 117 and 118 were discontinued from Ashland to Spencer.
