= Milwaukee Road 261 =

Preserved American 4-8-4 locomotive

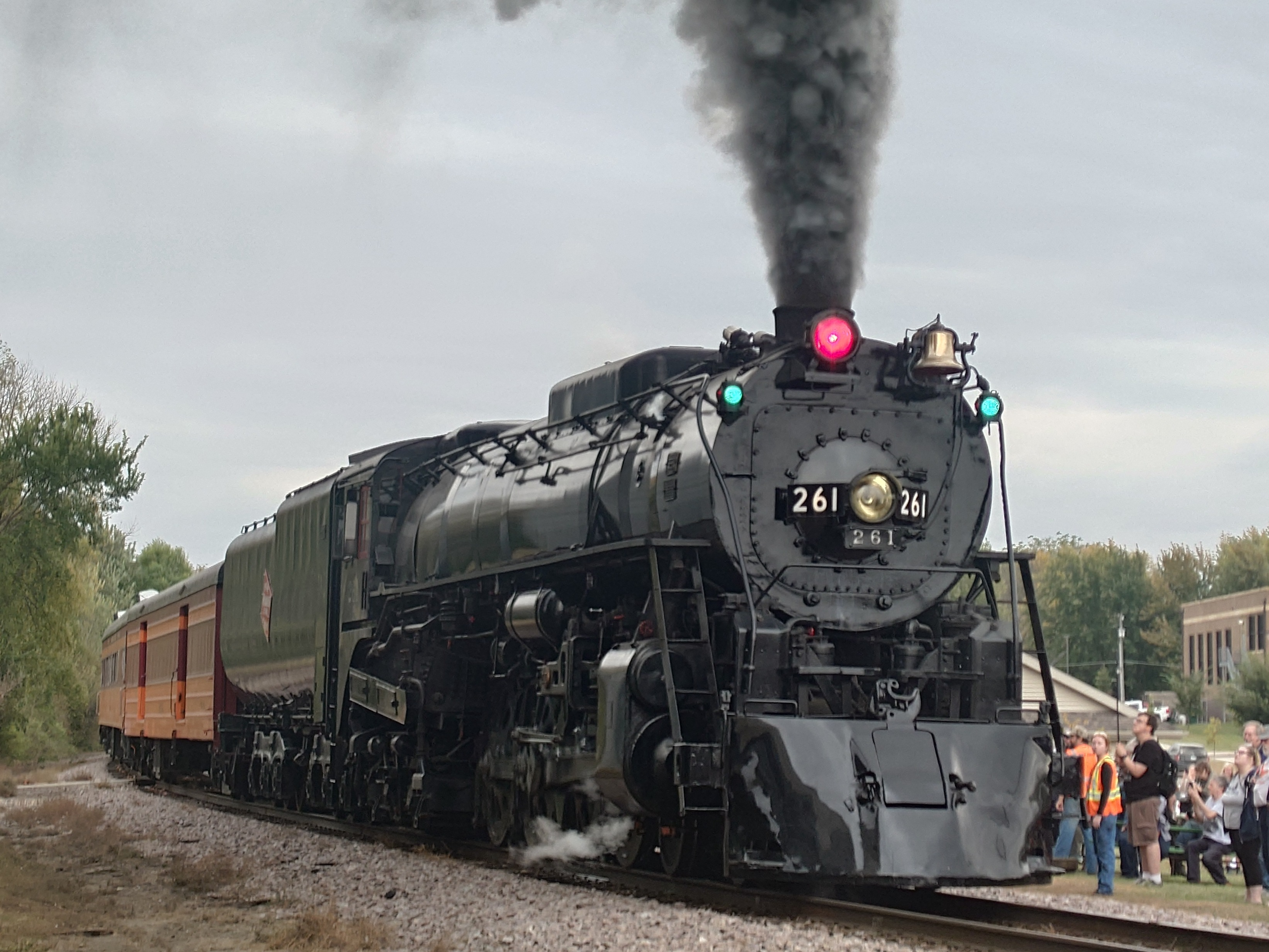
- Milwaukee Road No. 261 in Glencoe, Minnesota on October 5, 2025
Type and origin
- Power type: Steam
- Builder: American Locomotive Company (Schenectady Works)
- Serial number: 71974
- Build date: July 1944
Specifications
- Configuration
  - Whyte: 4-8-4
  - UIC: 2′D2′ h2
- Gauge: 4 ft 8 1/2 in (1,435 mm) standard gauge
- Leading dia.: 36 in (914 mm)
- Driver dia.: 74 in (1,880 mm)
- Trailing dia.: 38 in (965 mm) (lead axle); 44 in (1,118 mm) (trail axle)
- Wheelbase: with tender: 95.54 ft (29.12 m)
- Length: 109 ft 7 3/4 in (33.42 m)
- Height: 15 ft 6 in (4.72 m)
- Axle load: 64,825 lb (32.413 short tons)
- Adhesive weight: 259,300 lb (129.7 short tons)
- Loco weight: 460,000 lb (230 short tons)
- Tender weight: 364,100 lb (182.1 short tons)
- Total weight: 824,100 lb (412.1 short tons)
- Fuel type: Coal
- Fuel capacity: 50,000 lb (25 short tons)
- Water cap.: 20,000 US gal (76,000 L; 17,000 imp gal)
- Boiler pressure: 250 lbf/in^{2} (1.72 MPa)
- Cylinders: Two, outside
- Cylinder size: 26 in × 32 in (660 mm × 813 mm)
- Valve gear: Walschaerts
- Valve type: Piston valves
- Loco brake: Air
- Train brakes: Air
- Couplers: Knuckle
Performance figures
- Maximum speed: 100 mph (160 km/h)
- Power output: 4,500 hp (3,400 kW)
- Tractive effort: 62,119 lbf (276.32 kN)
- Factor of adh.: 4.17
Career
- Operators: Milwaukee Road; Friends of the 261
- Class: S3
- Number in class: 2nd of 10
- Numbers: MILW 261; DLW 1661
- Retired: August 1956
- Preserved: 1958
- Restored: September 14, 1993
- Current owner: Friends of the 261
- Disposition: Operational

Milwaukee Road 261 is a S3 class 4-8-4 "Northern" type steam locomotive, built by the American Locomotive Company (ALCO) in Schenectady, New York, in July 1944 for the Milwaukee Road (MILW). It was used for heavy mainline freight and passenger work until being retired by the MILW in 1956. Instead of being dismantled for scrap, No. 261 was preserved and moved to the National Railroad Museum in Green Bay, Wisconsin, in 1958.

As of 2026, the locomotive is owned, operated and maintained by the Minneapolis-based nonprofit organization Friends of the 261, which runs occasional and seasonal excursion trains using the locomotive. The steam engine, restored in 1993, has logged more than 25,000 miles (40,000 km) under its own power since that time.

== History ==
=== Revenue service and retirement ===
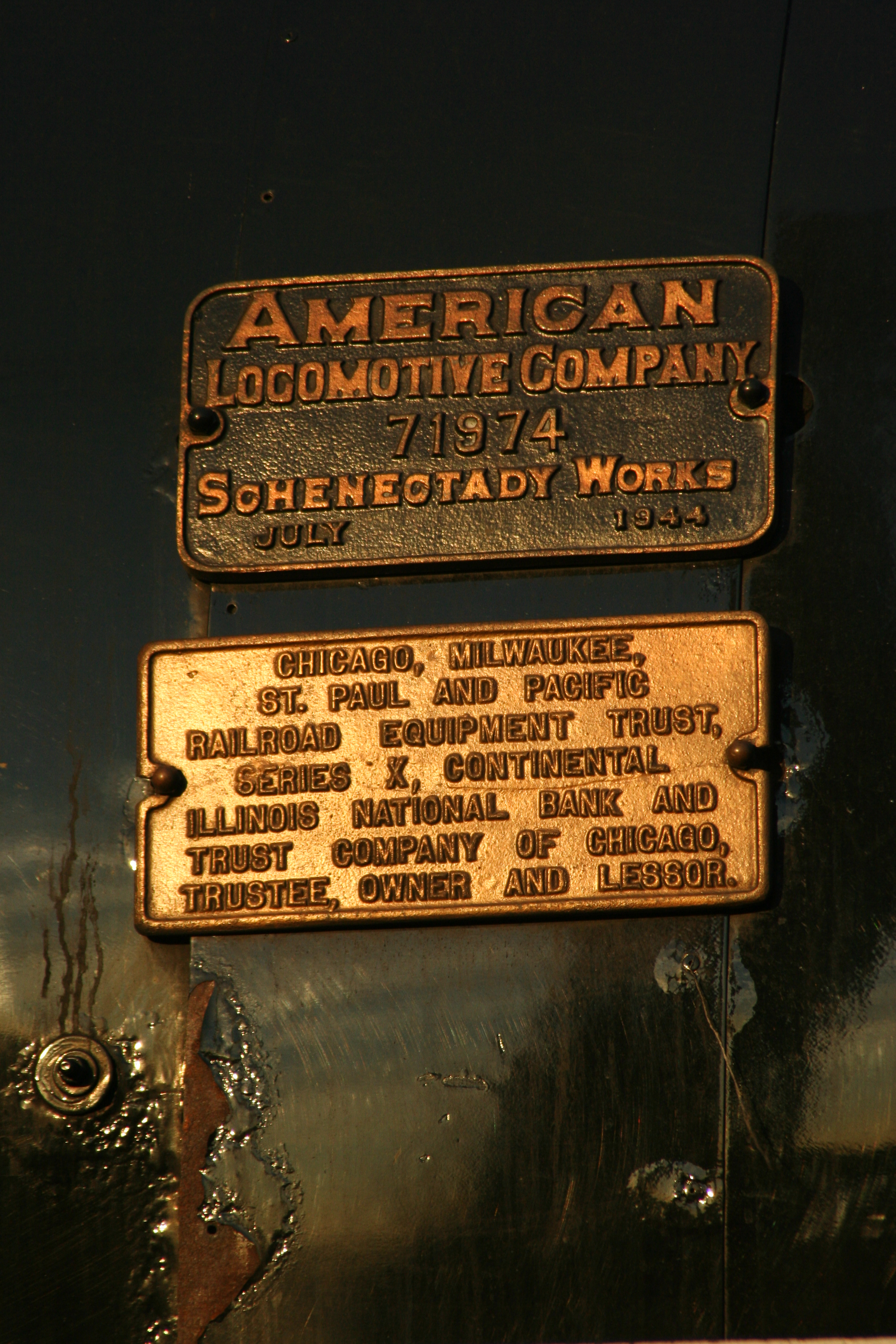
No. 261's builder's plate and equipment trust plate

In 1944, amidst a motive power shortage for wartime traffic, the Milwaukee Road received ten S3 class 4-8-4s from the American Locomotive Company (ALCO). The S3s, which were step-ups of the Milwaukee Road's Baldwin-built S2s, abided by wartime restrictions by opting against new design features and instead reused those from other 4-8-4s from the Union Pacific, Rock Island, and Delaware and Hudson. S3 No. 261, built and delivered in July 1944, is a coal-fueled 460,000-pound (210,000 kg) locomotive rated at a maximum of power output of 4,500 horsepower (3,400 kW), and a maximum speed of 100 mph (160 km/h).

No. 261 was initially assigned by the Milwaukee Road as a dual-service locomotive, pulling heavy freight and passenger trains between Chicago, Illinois and Omaha, Nebraska, and on occasion, it would haul eastern portions of transcontinental trains connecting to the railroad's Pacific Extension. Sometime later, No. 261, along with the other S3s, were modified with cab signals and automatic train stop systems to haul passenger trains between Chicago and Minneapolis, Minnesota. By March 1954, as the Milwaukee Road dieselized, No. 261 was mainly reassigned to freight and mail services in eastern portions of the Milwaukee Division.

By December 1954, No. 261 and the rest of the S3s made their final revenue runs, and the Milwaukee Road withdrew nearly all of their other remaining steam locomotives from service by December the following year; one locomotive (4-6-0 No. 1004) was retained as a switcher and weed-scalder until March 1957. The railroad had to wait until the S3s' equipment trusts expired before disposing of them, and when No. 261's trust expired, it was formally retired from the roster in August 1956.

At that time, its tender's roller bearing trucks were removed and swapped for friction bearing trucks, so the former would be used for a work train tender the railroad retained. Shortly thereafter, No. 261 was donated to the newly-established National Railroad Museum of Green Bay, Wisconsin, being personally presented by Milwaukee Road chairman Leo T. Crowley, and the locomotive became the first part of the museum's collection. In March 1958, No. 261, along with Soo Line 2718, were maneuvered by a Green Bay and Western (GB&W) diesel over a temporarily-laid spur into the museum's site in W. D. Cooke Park of Ashwaubenon, where they became the museum's first exhibits. They would be joined by other display locomotives within the ensuing years.

=== First excursion service ===
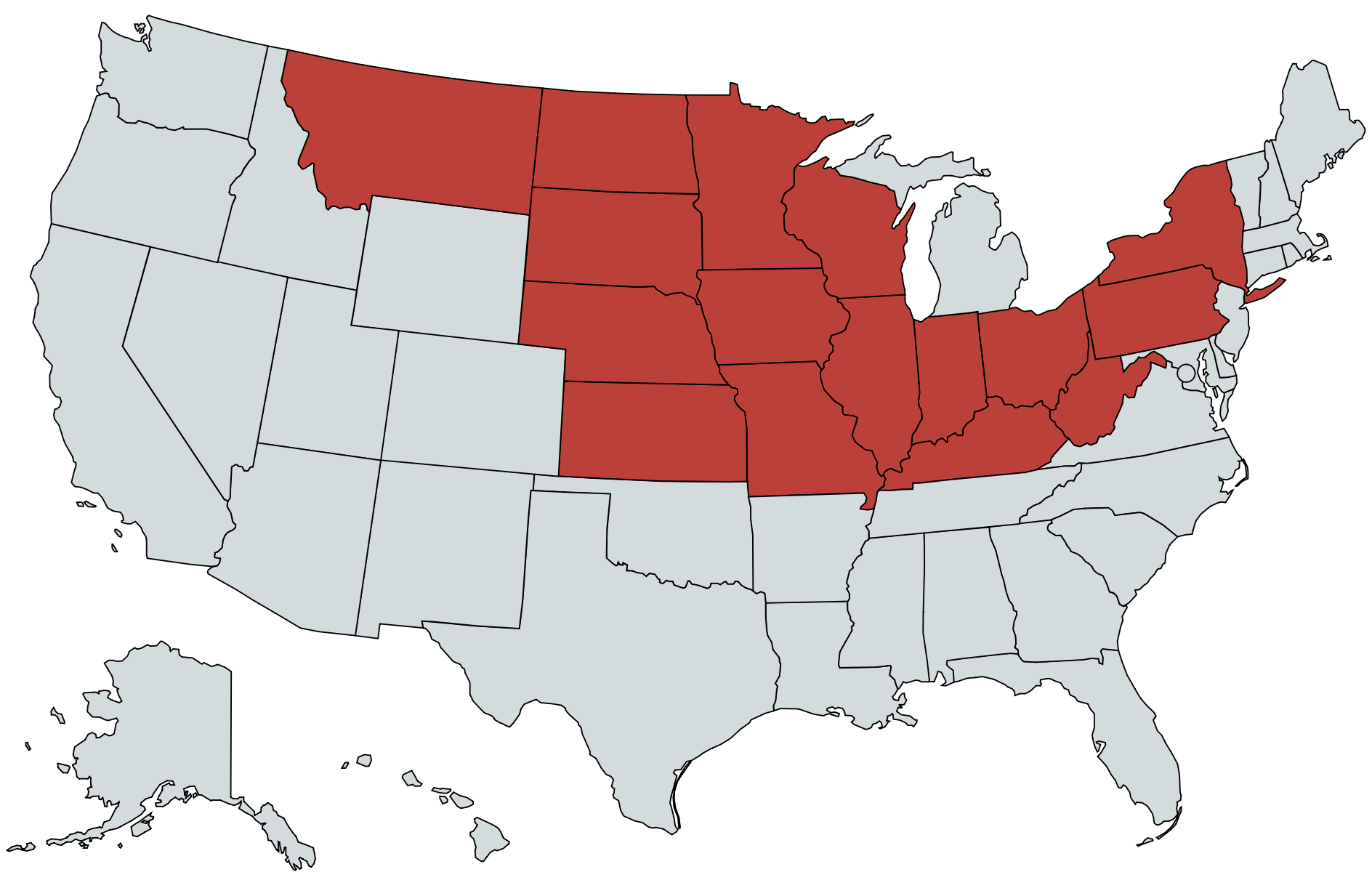
US states visited by No. 261 in excursion service

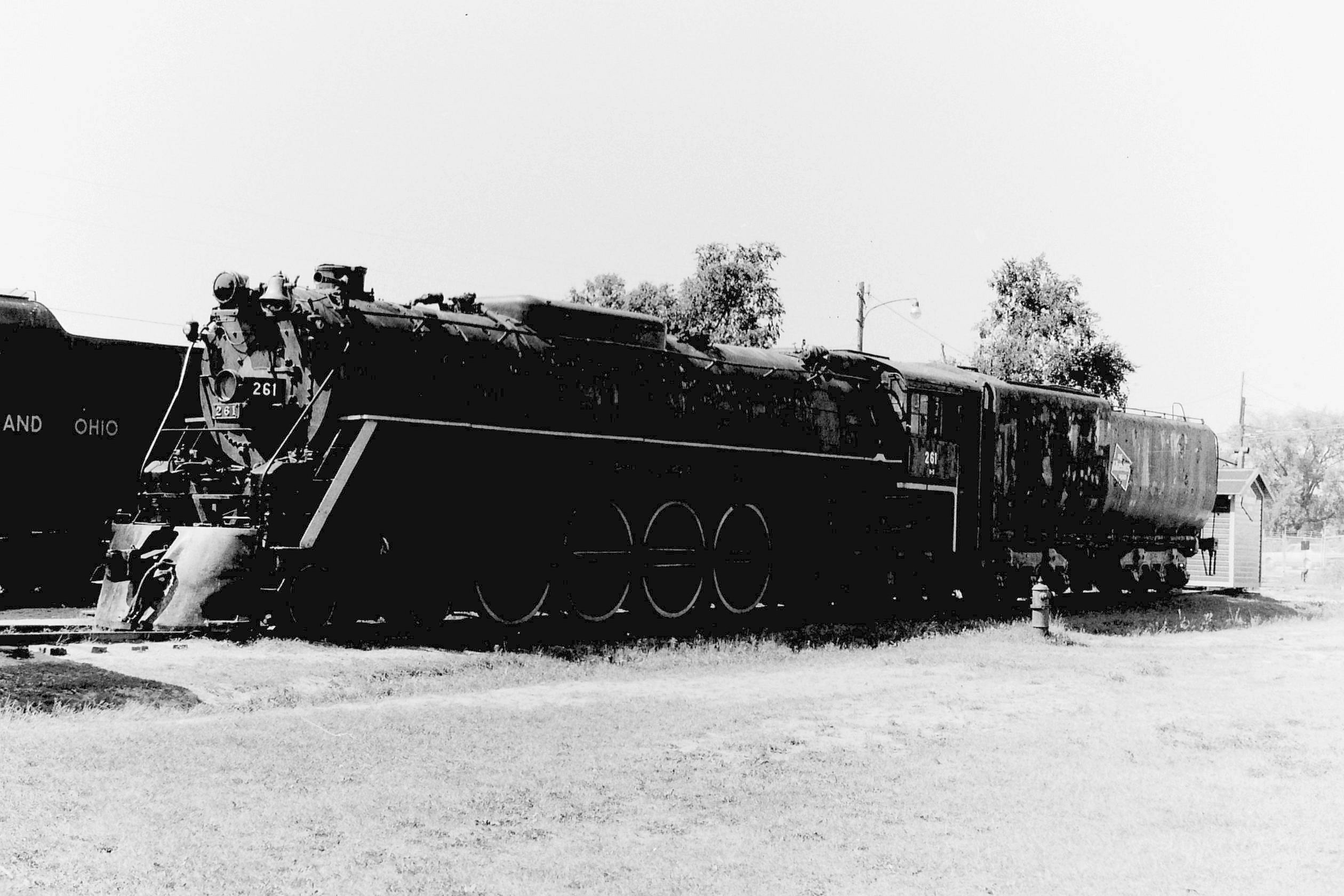
No. 261 on display at the National Railroad Museum in Green Bay, Wisconsin in August 1970

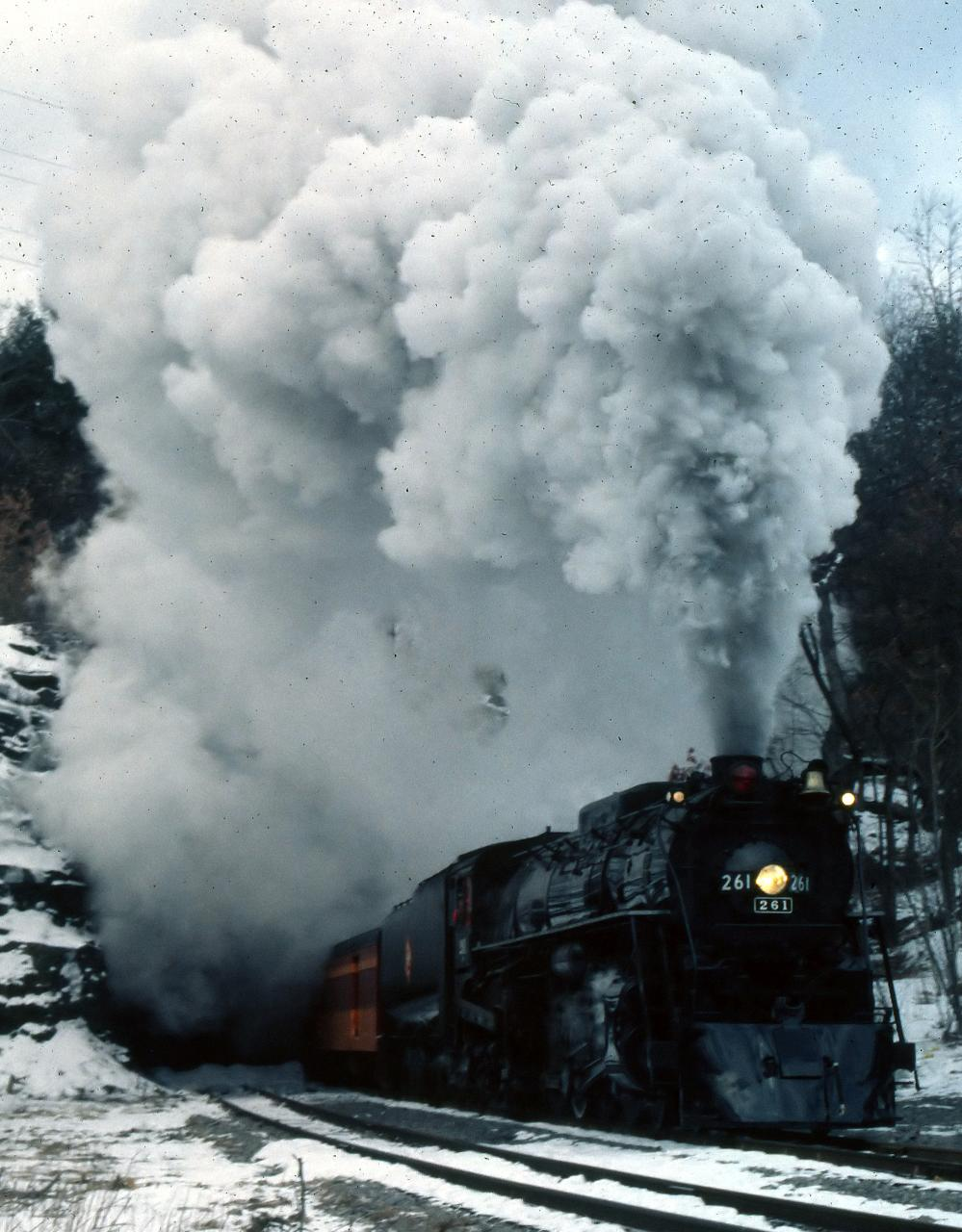
No. 261 exiting a tunnel in Scranton, Pennsylvania in February 1996

In 1991, North Star Rail, Inc., a for-profit organization founded by Mike Adams and Steve Sandberg, expressed interest in restoring and operating No. 261 for excursion service, having previously been contracted to maintain and operate Northern Pacific 328 for the Minnesota Transportation Museum. One reason No. 261 was chosen for restoration was because Sandberg's grandfather had served as the S3's engineer in revenue service, and Sandberg, who would become North Star Rail's chief operating officer, wanted to commit to the locomotive out of sentimentality. Other reasons for No. 261's selection: the 4-8-4 had become a common wheel arrangement for American steam locomotives used in mainline excursion service, since they could handle long consists at track speed; No. 261 had several modern features for a steam locomotive, including roller bearings; it already had its boiler jacketing removed, which contained asbestos and, therefore, would be expensive to remove for environmental and safety reasons; and the museum had kept No. 261 on display inside a newly-built car barn to reduce corrosion.

North Star Rail, with financial backing by twelve investors, reached an agreement with the National Railroad Museum in November 1991 for a ten-year lease, which was later renewed in 2001. In March 1992, No. 261 was moved out of the museum and to the Wisconsin Central's nearby car shop, where it was worked on by a full-time staff to prepare it for shipment to Minneapolis, with its tender rebuilt with roller bearing trucks, its running gear repaired, and its boiler prepped for rebuilding. Help was provided by a volunteer support group, the Friends of the 261, with members including Gary Bensman, Dave Redding, Jim French, and Steve Pahl Sr. In late September 1992, No. 261 was towed from Green Bay to the General Electric (GE) shops at Humboldt Yard in Minneapolis, where the rest of its rebuild took place.

Since North Star Rail already had the required funding in place, and with the Friends of the 261's support, work was able to quickly progress, allowing for a hydrostatic test in June 1993, a test fire in July, and eventual restoration completion in September. North Star Rail also hired former railroad executive Chuck Wiesner as their director of operations and development to help arrange No. 261's operations and excursion runs, and he had previously worked with the Mid-Continent Railway Museum. After passing its FRA inspection on September 14, 1993, No. 261, becoming the first Milwaukee Road steam locomotive to operate since 1957, deadheaded over the Wisconsin Central in time for its first public excursions on September 18–19. The S3 subsequently arrived at its new home at the leased Burlington Northern Minneapolis Junction facility.

Throughout 1994, No. 261 had an extensive season, consisting of numerous excursions on the Wisconsin Central and the Twin Cities and Western Railroad (TC&W). In May, as part of the Chocolate City Days festival hosted by Nestlé in Burlington, Wisconsin, No. 261 lead the Chocolate City Express excursion between Des Plaines, Illinois and Burlington. On the weekend of June 11–12, the National Railroad Museum hosted some No. 261-lead roundtrip excursions between Green Bay and Neenah, Wisconsin. In October, North Star Rail temporarily lent No. 261 to the Fort Wayne Railroad Historical Society (FWRHS), who in absence of their then-out of service Nickel Plate Road 765, ferried No. 261 over the CSX mainline to West Virginia, where the S3 lead that year's "New River Train". That same month, No. 261 was repainted as Delaware, Lackawanna and Western (DLW) No. 1661 for filming of Steam and Steel, a documentary film scheduled for showing at Steamtown National Historic Site. The 1994 season was wrapped up with an excursion that celebrated the 50th anniversary of No. 261's 1944 construction date. In 1995, North Star Rail, Inc. dissolved, and the non-profit Friends of the 261 took over the lease and operations of No. 261, with North Star Rail's management being carried over.

In June 1995, No. 261 hauled a one-way excursion, sponsored by Trains Magazine, over five days from Minneapolis to Scranton, Pennsylvania, where it participated in Steamtown National Historic Site's formal grand opening celebrations the following month. The S3 was originally scheduled to doublehead with Pere Marquette 1225 from Michigan through Canada and into New York state, before continuing south, but the route had to be eschewed at the last moment, upon concerns with clearance of No. 1225's cylinders inside the Detroit River Tunnel. No. 261 instead traveled over CSX from Chicago to New Castle, Pennsylvania, and the Buffalo and Pittsburgh to Buffalo, before proceeding to Scranton. No. 1225 remained in Michigan, since its owners requested ferry funds that were not instantly available. The 4-8-4 subsequently stayed for one year in Scranton, pulling numerous excursions, including rare-mileage trips, a rare snowplow run, and a doubleheader excursion with New York, Susquehanna and Western 142 between Scranton and Syracuse, New York. A Hancock 3-chime whistle was temporarily added to the locomotive and then replaced with an AT&SF 6-chime whistle, which continues to remain on it as of 2026, but still also keeping its original non-Hancock 3 chime whistle and Leslie A-125 air horn. No. 261 returned to the Midwest in early 1996, and upon arrival, the locomotive made its first runs over the newly-formed BNSF Railway. It pulled a few sets of excursions in 1997 and 1998 over BNSF and TC&W trackage.

The year of 1998 presented No. 261 with its biggest assignment yet, as it was the first steam engine to pull BNSF's Employee Appreciation Special. The engine led a BNSF locomotive and a dozen of BNSF's business-car fleet around the upper Midwest portion of BNSF's route. This brought the engine back to Chicago before heading north to North Dakota and Montana, then through Minneapolis into Iowa before the EAS concluded at Topeka Railroad Days. 261 ended the 1998 operating season after a few more days on BNSF tracks.

The 1999 season was short, with a weekend excursion in May from Minneapolis to Duluth along with runs on the Lake Superior Railroad Museum's tracks and another excursion in September. The year 2000 saw No. 261 leading excursions out of places such as Chicago, Omaha, and Kansas City. The engine also led an AAPRCO private-car special on August 29 to Duluth. The engine then led a long circle-trip over the Duluth, Missabe and Iron Range Railway as well as the North Shore Railroad System before heading back home. The 2001 season had excursions out of Minneapolis and Montevideo over BNSF and TC&W tracks during June and July, with a complete set of Hiawatha passenger cars. The next year, 261 pulled an almost-matching consist between Minneapolis and Chicago. At this point, insurance rates were skyrocketing due to outside events, as well as new FRA guidelines. The Friends of the 261 had an insurance policy to run through 2002, making these trips among the last time that the group could afford to have 261 run solo.

2003–2008

In the following months, some major changes were made to the Friends of the 261's operations. With insurance being too high to charge reasonable ticket prices, the group decided to team up with Amtrak. Amtrak is self-insured, so the added cost of excursion insurance was much less, but all equipment was required to meet Amtrak certification. No. 261 became the second steam locomotive to become Amtrak-certified, and the Friends of the 261 began to purchase or rebuild coaches that would meet Amtrak specifications. The first team-up with Amtrak occurred in October 2003, with the engine's return to old Milwaukee Road tracks between Minneapolis and Winona, Minnesota. These trips were repeated each year until 2008.

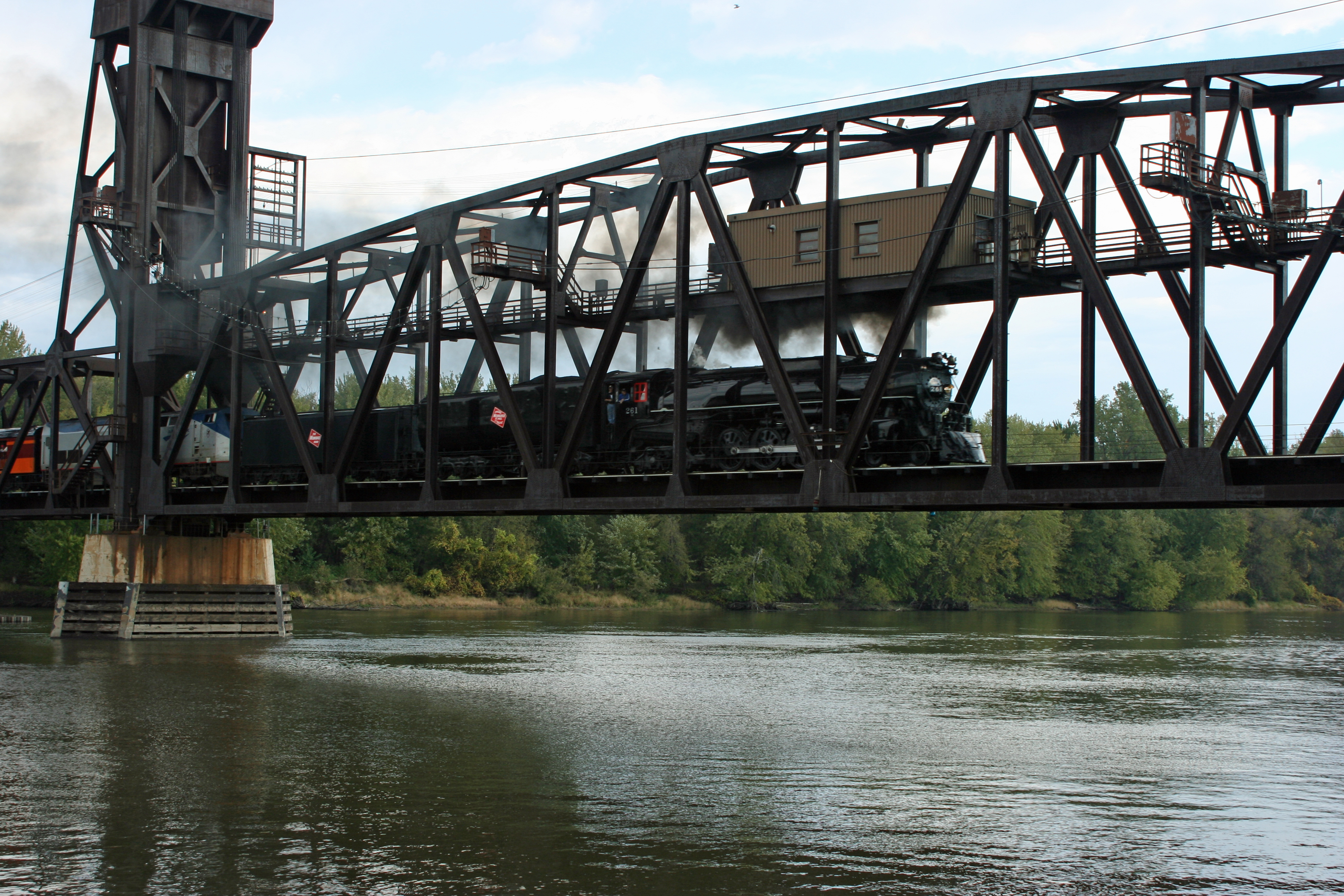
261 crossing the Mississippi River at Hastings, Minnesota, in October 2007

In June 2004, No. 261 made its first return visit to Milwaukee since being restored, and then it travelled to Chicago to participate in the Grand Excursion: an approximate reenactment of the original 1854 celebration train of the same name. It departed from Chicago, arriving in Rock Island, Illinois, to celebrate the 150th anniversary of the Chicago and Rock Island Railroad, which was the first to reach the Mississippi River. During the Grand Excursion, No. 261 made day trips to Savanna, Illinois, over the Iowa, Chicago and Eastern Railroad (IC&E), and to Bureau Junction, Illinois, on the Iowa Interstate Railroad (IAIS), current owner/operator of the first railroad line to the Mississippi River. The train then traveled north along IC&E rails near the river, making overnight stops at Dubuque, Iowa, and La Crosse, Wisconsin. The final leg up to the Twin Cities operated in Wisconsin on BNSF trackage. On July 3, No. 261 performed a doubleheader run with visiting locomotive Canadian Pacific 2816 from St. Paul to La Crescent and return.

No. 261 ran excursions from Minneapolis to Duluth via BNSF trackage in both 2005 and 2007.

Three June 2006 excursions were launched from Milwaukee: a dinner train in Friday, June 23 to Sturtevant, Wisconsin, and Saturday and Sunday excursions (24th and 25th) to Wisconsin Dells. For these runs, the train was turned at New Lisbon. These excursions would be repeated in August 2008.

In September 2006, No. 261 and its train visited Rock Island, Illinois, as part of RiverWay 2006, a Quad Cities celebration of the 150th anniversary of the first railroad bridge across the Mississippi River in 1856. As part of the festivities, No. 261's train was coupled to a pair of Chinese-built QJ 2-10-2 consisting of IAIS steam locomotives 6988 and 7081 for a trip to Homestead, Iowa, on September 15, 2006. The next day, No. 261 was added to run a triple-header from Rock Island to Bureau Junction, Illinois; then, on the following day, the QJs pulled the train, without 261, to Muscatine, Iowa, and back. Diesels were not used on any of these excursions.

In September 2007, No. 261 reunited with No. 2816 for another doubleheader between Minneapolis and La Crosse. The Friends of the 261 had helped the Canadian Pacific Railway plan No. 2816's return of that year, as well as providing half of the consist the locomotive led.

In May 2008, No. 261 was featured on a photo charter on the Twin Cities and Western Railroad. Following this, the locomotive travelled to Chicago, where it was filmed for Public Enemies, a film based on the life of John Dillinger and starred Johnny Depp and Christian Bale. Though No. 261 was built ten years after Dillinger died, the S3 did fit the bill for a steam engine that could be filmed at Chicago Union Station. No. 261 hauled its final excursion of 2008 in September on Canadian Pacific's ex-Milwaukee Road line from Minneapolis to Winona, with a return on BNSF's ex-Burlington Northern line from La Crosse to Minneapolis. No. 261 was then pulled from service for an FRA-mandated 15-year inspection, and the Friends of the 261 quickly initiated a rebuild of the locomotive.

=== Acquisition from the National Railroad Museum ===
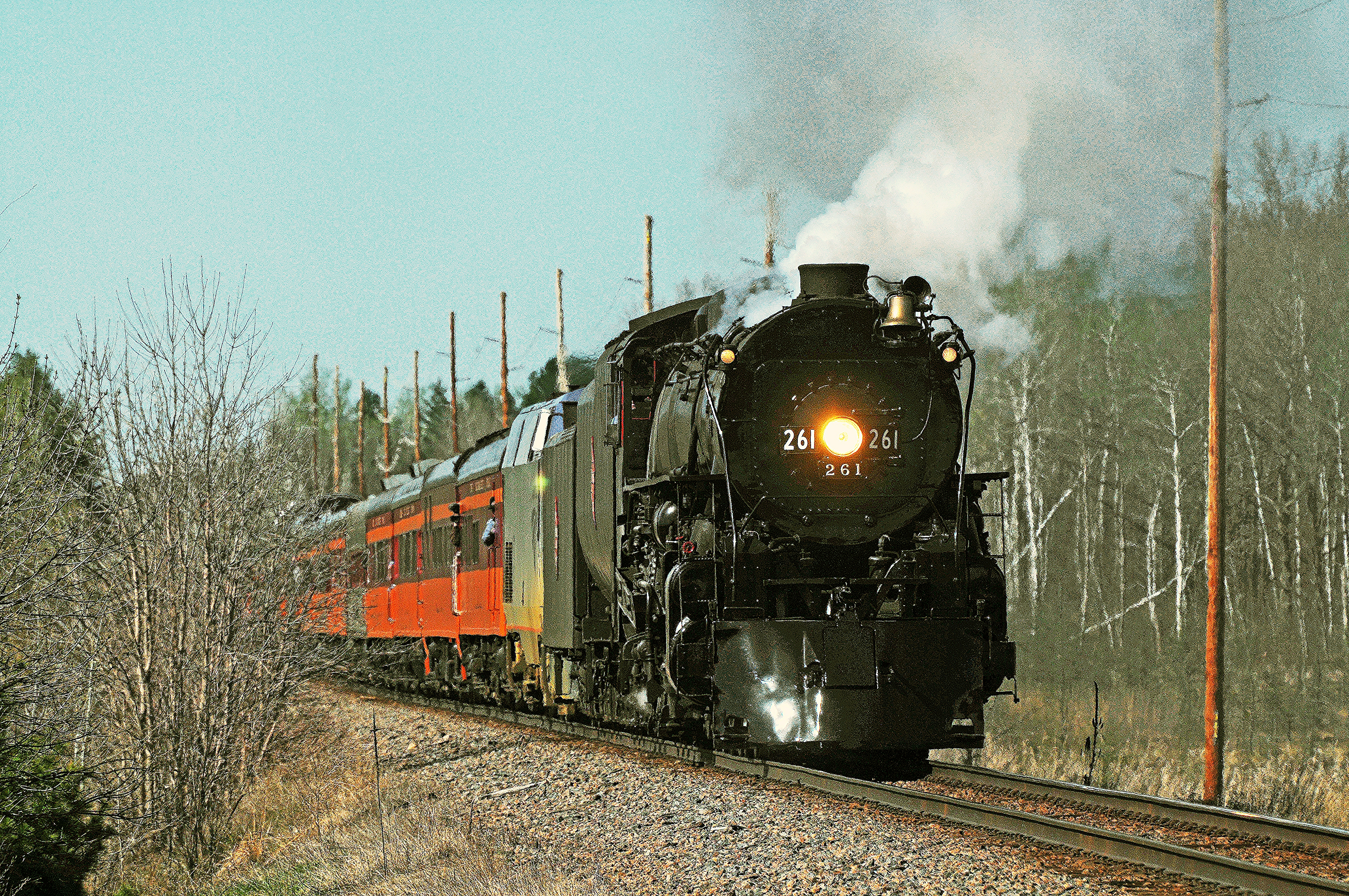
No. 261 operating an excursion to St. Paul, Minnesota, on May 12, 2013

In 2009, the work on 261 was halted to concentrate on Southern Pacific 4449, which was arranged by the Friends of the 4449 organization, the Steam Railroading Institute, and Amtrak to participate in Train Festival 2009, and the Friends of the 261 played a major part in sending the locomotive to the event. The group provided several passenger cars for No. 4449's long-distance excursion from Portland, Oregon, to Owosso, Michigan, that started on July 3, 2009, as well as Train Festival 2009. After being away for three months, the No. 4449 returned to Portland on October 20, 2009.

In November 2009, the Friends of the 261 and the National Railroad Museum had problems with negotiations over lease agreements. The museum was asking too much for the Friends to pay, especially while in the middle of a large overhaul. Per the terms of their agreement, the Friends of the 261 would be responsible for returning the locomotive to the Museum. The Friends of the 261 decided to end the lease with the National Railroad Museum, citing the high costs. In an email dated November 17, 2009, Steve Sandberg, the Friends' chief operating officer, informed the museum that his organization had decided to discontinue operating No. 261, according to Michael E. Telzrow, executive director of the museum. The Friends made plans to return No. 261 to Green Bay for permanent display, while they began searching for another steam locomotive to restore and operate.

While the negotiations fell off, No. 261 was listed for sale at $225,000 on the website of Sterling Rail, a rail equipment broker. In January 2010, an unnamed California-based collector and businessman entered talks with the National Railroad Museum with interest in acquiring No. 261, and he claimed to be interested in allowing the Friends to overhaul and operate it. At the time of the announcement, Sandberg said to Trains magazine that he was still in talks with other organizations about leasing and operating a different locomotive, but he would not rule out the possibility of cooperating with the collector. In early March 2010, Michael Telzrow left the National Railroad Museum to become executive director of the Wisconsin Veterans Museum, and later that same month, the former's deal with the California-based collector fell through. The museum's acting executive director, Bob Young, quickly entered negotiations with Sandberg for a purchasing deal. In May, the Friends of the 261 announced that they finalized an agreement with the museum and bought No. 261, securing hope that it would return to service, but the money used for the transaction had been saved for the rebuild, and the organization then asked for donations to recoup the loss.

=== Second excursion service ===
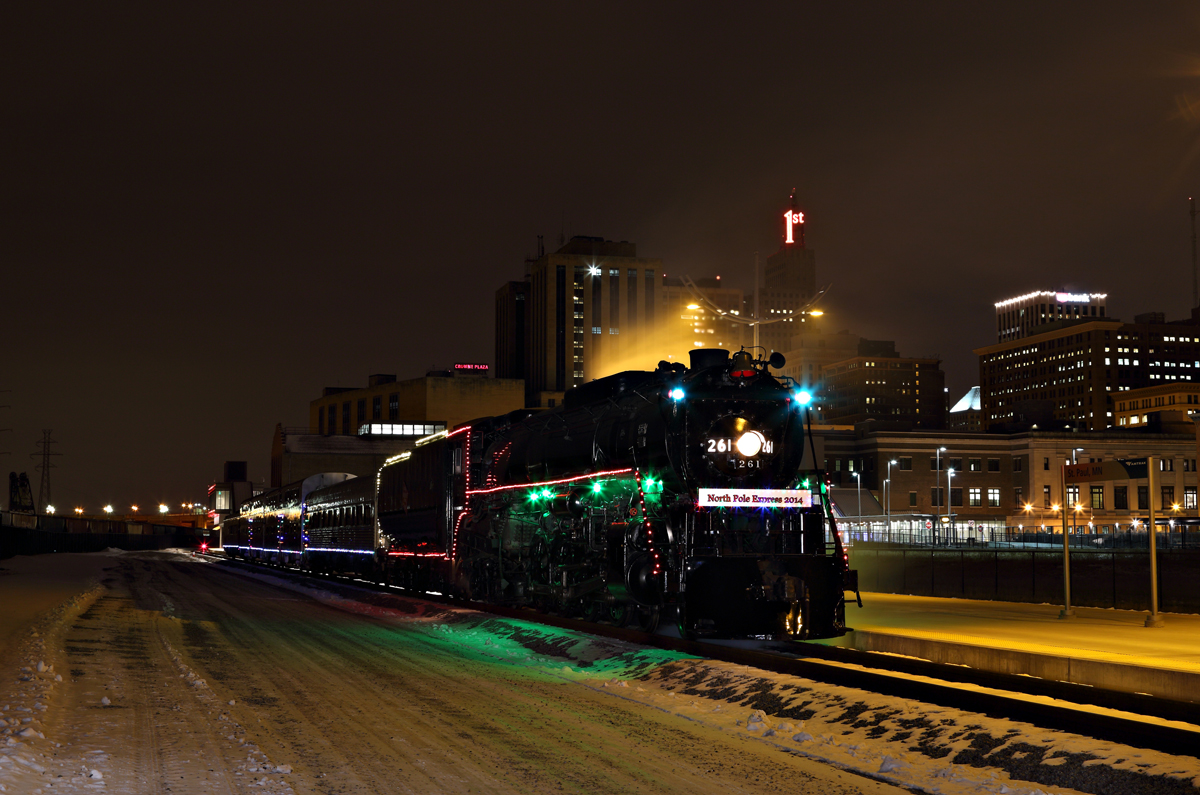
No. 261 decorated as the North Pole Express at the St. Paul Union Depot in 2014

In 2013, No. 261's four-year rebuild was successfully completed. On May 11 (National Train Day), No. 261 hauled its first post-rebuild excursion northbound from Minneapolis to the Lake Superior Railroad Museum in Duluth, where it met Soo Line 2719 for the first time. No. 261 stayed in Duluth overnight and was featured in a night photo session with No. 2719. On May 12, No. 261 returned to Minneapolis, accompanied by Amtrak P42DC No. 17.

On October 12, 2013, No. 261 made a round-trip fall-color excursion to Willmar, Minnesota. On October 13, 2013, No. 261 made a second round-trip excursion to Boylston, Wisconsin. Amtrak P40DC No. 824 joined 261 for these trips.

On September 27, 2014, No. 261 ran on a round-trip Fall Colors Excursion to Duluth, returning to Minneapolis on September 28. The excursion traveled on BNSF's Hinckley Subdivision. Amtrak P42DC No. 174 joined No. 261 for this trip.

In 2014, No. 261 operated the Inaugural North Pole Express in St. Paul. For two weekends, No. 261 operated out of St. Paul Union Depot and lead short-distance trips decorated for this excursion. The train consisted of four coaches and operated on a one mile (1.6 km) long line on the Depot grounds. No. 261 even posed next to Canadian Pacific's Holiday Train when it also visited the depot. It reprised its role as the locomotive for the North Pole Express at St. Paul Union Depot from 2015 to 2022, operating over two weekends each December. During the 2022 run, the locomotive only operated the first weekend; the 32A operated trains the second.

In October 2015, No. 261 attended the 2015 Railway Interchange Show in Minneapolis on October 4–7. On October 10, 261 pulled a daytime round-trip excursion to Boylston, Wisconsin, where it was wyed and returned to Minneapolis. The next day, No. 261 did the same to Willmar, Minnesota, but used a turntable to face forward for the return to Minneapolis. Amtrak's Phase IV heritage unit No. 184 joined No. 261 for both trips.

No. 261 traveled to St. Paul Union Depot under steam to be displayed along other equipment for "Union Depot Train Days", celebrating the 90th anniversary of the building. It was featured in a night photo shoot with Soo Line 2500, an EMD FP7.

On June 4, 2016, No. 261 ran a round-trip to Duluth, Minnesota, returning to Minneapolis on June 5. Amtrak had been power short, so No. 261 performed this trip on its own. In September 2016, 261 operated on Twin Cities and Western Railroad and Minnesota Prairie Line trackage. The Minnesota Prairie Line is former Chicago and North Western Railway trackage that originally belonged to the Minneapolis and St. Louis Railway. No. 261 operated as far west as Winthrop, Minnesota. It was the first time in 60 years that a steam engine had operated on the Minnesota Prairie Line. The same route was operated in the fall of 2017.

In October 2016, No. 261 operated three round-trips from Minneapolis on the Twin Cities and Western, running on former Milwaukee Road tracks. 261 operated without a diesel helper except to be pulled back to Minneapolis, as there were no places to turn the train around.

In June 2017, No. 261 operated on the Red River Valley and Western Railroad in North Dakota.

In June 2018, No. 261 was scheduled to make another visit to the Lake Superior Railroad Museum in Duluth while hauling an excursion over BNSF to fundraise a planned Positive train control (PTC) installation on the S3, but in May, after tickets had already been sold, the Friends of the 261 was abruptly forced to cancel the excursion, since Amtrak CEO Richard Anderson imposed heavy restrictions on private charter trips, disregarding the Friends' long-time partnership with Amtrak.

On September 8 and 9, 2018, No. 261 hauled two fall excursions on the Twin Cities and Western from Minneapolis to Glencoe, Minnesota, with a stop near Norwood Young America, Minnesota, for Gourmet Food and Wine tours and a photo runby.

On September 22, 2018, for the 25th anniversary of No. 261's first excursions in 1993, the locomotive pulled a special train for the annual convention of the American Association of Private Railroad Car Owners (AAPRCO).

In May 2019, after an agreement made in January, the Friends of the 261 acquired former Milwaukee Road EMD E9 No. 32A from the Wisconsin and Southern Railroad (WSOR), a subsidiary of Watco. First showcased at Union Depot Day from May 31 to June 2, it pulled its first excursion on June 22, still painted in Wisconsin and Southern colors minus the former lettering. The E9 locomotive has since been repainted into Milwaukee colors and debuted in its new paint scheme on May 12, 2021.

In June 2019, No. 261 lead two excursions for the Milwaukee Road Historical Association convention being held in Minneapolis, called the 261 Hiawatha. On June 22, 2019, the train operated from Minneapolis to Brownton, Minnesota, on the Twin Cities and Western. On June 23, 2019, the train traveled between Minneapolis and Norwood/Young America on TC&W, then from Norwood to Winthrop on TC&W subsidiary Minnesota Prairie Line: a rare-mileage trip for No. 261. On September 21–22, 2019, there were two excursions for the Gourmet Express.

On March 11, 2021, a $200,000 proposal was made to convert No. 261's firebox from burning coal to oil. This would not be the first time an S3 locomotive was converted to oil, as Nos. 262, 263, 267 and 269 were converted to oil during their revenue careers. On October 2 and 3, No. 261 hauled the Gourmet Express through Hopkins, Chanhassen, Norwood and Glencoe. In January 2022, the Railroading Heritage of Midwest America (RRHMA), the parent organization for the Friends of the 261, acquired a large disused Rock Island shop facility in Silvis, Illinois, and in April that same year, the organization received numerous historic locomotives and passenger cars, including steam locomotives Nos. 3985, 5511, and DDA40X No. 6936, as a donation from the Union Pacific Railroad, expanding the organization's operations beyond No. 261's runs.

On October 4–5, 2025, No. 261 lead back-to-back excursions for the bbq harvest Express over the TC&W, making them the locomotive's first extensive excursions since 2022. The locations that 261 went to was in Chanhassen, and went to Glencoe. In March 2026, it was announced that No. 261 would lead a series of extensive USA 250 Hiawatha excursions in July over the TC&W between Chanhassen, Montevideo, Granite Falls, and Appleton, and the excursions would contribute to the United States Semiquincentennial celebrations.

== See also ==
- Chesapeake and Ohio 614
- Chicago, Burlington and Quincy 5632
- Nashville, Chattanooga and St. Louis 576
- Norfolk and Western 611
- Spokane, Portland and Seattle 700
- Union Pacific 844

== Bibliography ==
- Smith, Mark (November–December 1993). "Preservation News — The Big Locomotives". Locomotive & Railway Preservation (L&RP). No. 44. Pentrex. pp. 7–10.
