= Northern Pacific 328 =

Preserved Northern Pacific S-10 steam locomotive

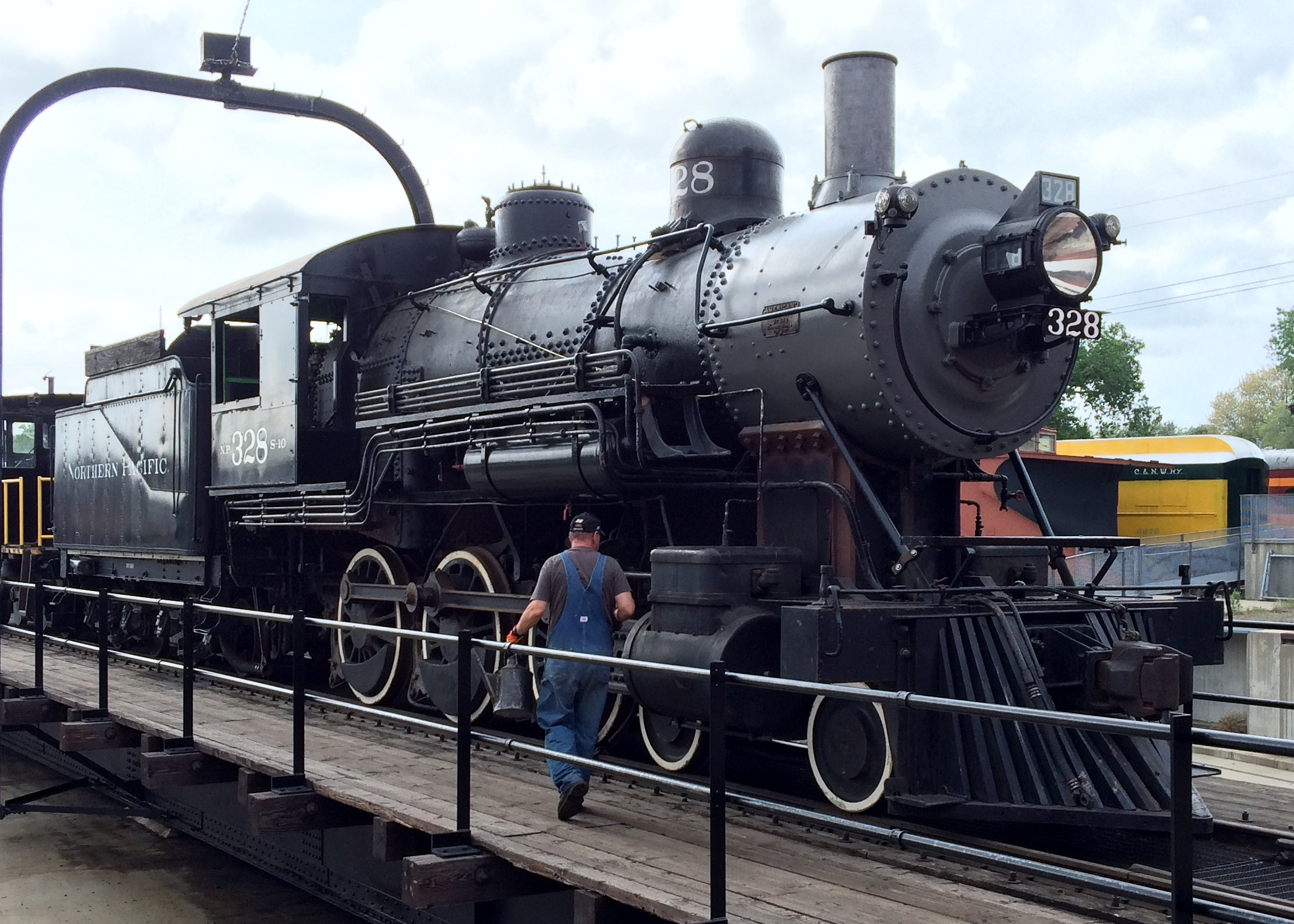
- NP 328 being cleaned on the Turntable at the Minnesota Transportation Museum's Jackson Street Roundhouse
Type and origin
- Power type: Steam
- Builder: American Locomotive Company (Rogers Locomotive and Machine Works)
- Serial number: 37583
- Build date: August 1905
Specifications
- Configuration
  - Whyte: 4-6-0
  - UIC: 2′C
- Gauge: 4 ft 8 1/2 in (1,435 mm)
- Leading dia.: 30 in (762 mm)
- Driver dia.: 57 in (1,448 mm)
- Wheelbase: 21 ft 1 in (6.426 m)
- Length: 58 ft 6 in (17.83 m)
- Height: 14 ft 4 in (4.37 m)
- Adhesive weight: 115,000 lb (52,163 kg)
- Loco weight: 153,000 lb (69,000 kg)
- Tender weight: 104,000 lb (47,000 kg)
- Fuel type: Coal
- Fuel capacity: 8 t (7.9 long tons; 8.8 short tons)
- Water cap.: 5,500 US gal (21,000 L; 4,600 imp gal)
- Firebox
  - Grate area: 38.5 sq ft (3.58 m^{2})
- Boiler pressure: 190 lbf/in^{2} (1.31 MPa)
- Heating surface
  - Tubes and flues: 1,865 sq ft (173.3 m^{2})
  - Total surface: 2,010 sq ft (187 m^{2})
- Cylinders: Two, outside
- Cylinder size: 19 mm × 26 mm (0.75 in × 1.02 in)
- Valve gear: Stephenson
- Valve type: Slide valves
- Loco brake: Air
- Train brakes: Air
- Couplers: Knuckle
Performance figures
- Tractive effort: 26,600 Ibf (118 kN)
Career
- Operators: Northern Pacific Railway; Osceola & St. Croix Valley Railway; Minnesota Transportation Museum
- Class: S-10
- Numbers: NP 328
- Nicknames: The Blueberry Special
- Locale: Montana, North Dakota, Minnesota, Wisconsin
- Retired: August 1950 (revenue service); 1999 (excursion service)
- Restored: May 1981
- Current owner: Minnesota Transportation Museum
- Disposition: On static display

Northern Pacific 328 is a preserved S-10 class (NP S-10) 4-6-0 "Ten Wheeler" type steam locomotive. Built in August 1905 by ALCO's Roger Works, the locomotive hauled passenger trains along the NP system until it was retired in August 1950. After being on display in Stillwater, Minnesota's city park, it was restored to operational condition in 1981, and was retired again in 1999. As of 2026, the locomotive is on static display at the Minnesota Transportation Museum's Jackson street Roundhouse.

== History ==
=== Revenue service ===
No. 328 was built in August 1905 by the American Locomotive Company at their Rogers plant in Patterson, New Jersey. It was originally designed for fast passenger service. In 1940, it was named Blueberry Special, after the train that ran between Rush City, Minnesota and Grantsburg, Wisconsin. No. 328 pulled the last train to Taylors Falls on June 30, 1948. In 1949, L-10 0-6-0 No. 1167 replaced 328 on the Grantsburg branch.

=== First retirement ===
In August 1950, No. 328 was retired and was sold to the Minnesota Railfans Association. It was displayed at the city park in Stillwater, Minnesota, for 26 years.

=== Excursion service ===
In 1976, it was leased by the Minnesota Transportation Museum for an operational restoration. The engine returned to service in May 1981, and ran excursion trips during the 1980s. Between 1987 and 1991, No. 328 returned to the Stillwater Branch and was owned by the Minnesota Transportation Museum and was a “crown jewel” of the historic experience. In 1992 NP served as a regular locomotive on MTM's Osceola & St. Croix, MN and Dresser, WI. In 1998, No. 328 had its most famous trip when it participated in a triple header with Soo Line 1003 and Soo Line 2719 at SteamFest '98 from Wisconsin to Minnesota. In 1999, it traveled a few more miles from the Stillwater and Taylors Falls branches it once frequented and made occasional special trips around the Twin Cities.

=== Second retirement ===
In 1999, No. 328 was retired from service once again and today it is an exhibit at the Jackson Street Roundhouse. There are unknown plans to restore No. 328 back to operation.

== See also ==
- St. Louis-San Francisco 1522
- Milwaukee Road 261
- Nickel Plate Road 587
- Soo Line 1003
- Soo Line 2719
- Southern Pacific 4449
- Union Pacific 844

== Bibliography ==
- Garratt, Collin (2006). Locomotives: A Complete History of the World's Great Locomotives and Fabulous Train Journeys. Lorenz Books. p. 165, 167. ISBN 978-0754816577.
