= Minneapolis, St. Paul and Sault Ste. Marie Railroad =

Defunct American Class I railroad

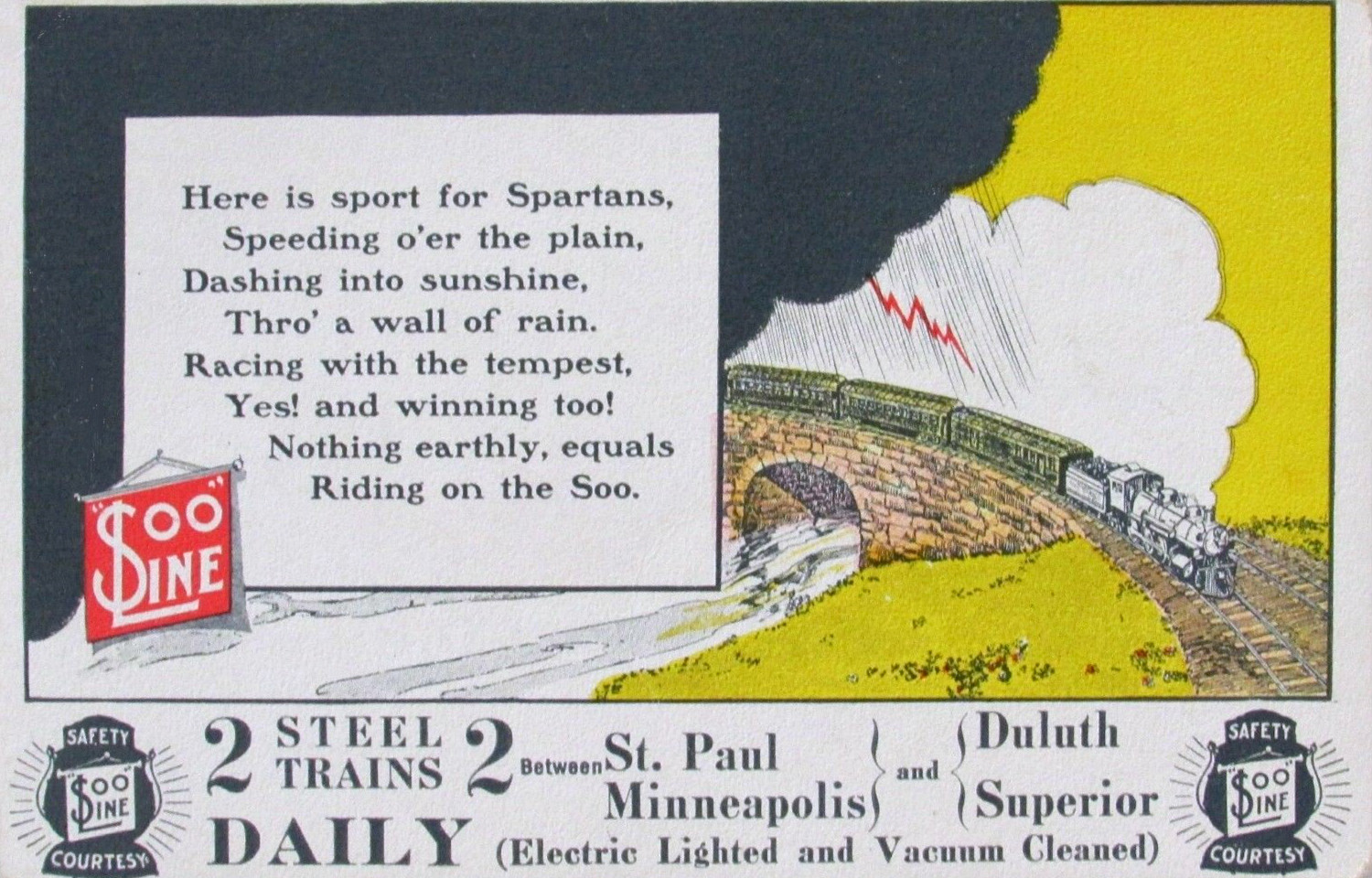
- A postcard advertisement for the railroad's service between Minneapolis/St. Paul and Duluth/Superior, circa 1910

Overview
- Parent company: Canadian Pacific Railway
- Headquarters: Minneapolis, Minnesota
- Reporting mark: SOO
- Locale: North Dakota to Chicago
- Dates of operation: 1883–1961
- Successor: Soo Line Railroad

Technical
- Track gauge: 4 ft 8 1/2 in (1,435 mm) standard gauge
- Length: 4,800 mi (7,700 km)

The Minneapolis, St. Paul and Sault Ste. Marie Railroad (MStP&SSM; reporting mark SOO) is a Class I railroad subsidiary of the Canadian Pacific Railway in the Midwestern United States. Commonly known since its opening in 1884 as the Soo Line after the phonetic spelling of Sault, it was merged with several other major CP subsidiaries on January 1, 1961, to form the Soo Line Railroad.

== Passenger service ==
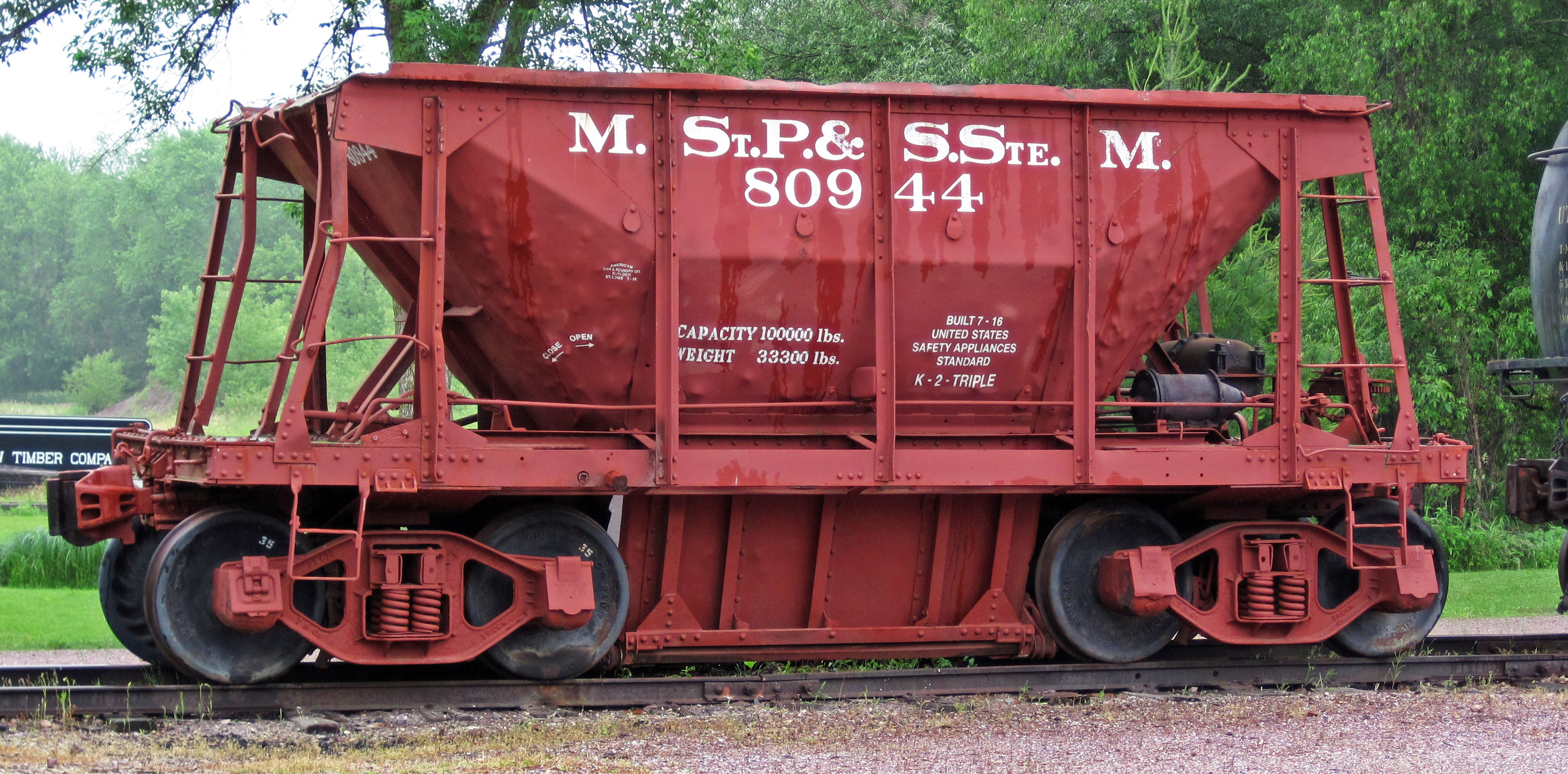
A well-used Soo Line ore car, built in 1916. Hauling iron ore was an important part of the Soo Line's business.

The Soo Line was never a major carrier of passenger traffic since its route between Chicago and Minneapolis was much longer than the competing Chicago, Milwaukee, St. Paul and Pacific Railroad (Milwaukee Road), Chicago and North Western Railway, and Chicago, Burlington and Quincy Railroad (Burlington Route) routes. It also had no direct access to Milwaukee.

The primary trains operated by the Soo Line were:

- The Laker which operated an overnight service from Chicago's Grand Central Station to Duluth–Superior with a portion to Minneapolis–St. Paul. An additional portion served Ashland, Wisconsin, until January 1959. The Laker was discontinued completely on January 15, 1965.
- The Winnipeger which operated overnight between Minneapolis–St. Paul and Winnipeg. It was discontinued in March 1967.
- A Minneapolis–St. Paul to Western Canada service. During the 1920s and 1930s, the Soo Line operated the Soo-Pacific, a summer-only Chicago to Vancouver service with the Canadian Pacific Railway. This later became The Mountaineer, which was then reduced to Minneapolis–St. Paul to Vancouver, before being discontinued in early August 1960. The Mountaineer was a summer-season-only train that carried exclusively sleeping cars but no coaches. During the non-summer months, the train ran as the Soo-Dominion from Minneapolis–St. Paul to Moose Jaw, Saskatchewan, where it was combined into Canadian Pacific's The Dominion transcontinental passenger train. It was cut back to a St. Paul to Portal, North Dakota, run after CP discontinued passenger service to Portal at the end of 1960, before being discontinued entirely in December 1963.
- A Minneapolis–St. Paul to Sault Ste. Marie, Michigan, overnight train, which was discontinued in March 1959.

Additionally, local trains served Chicago to Minneapolis–St. Paul, Duluth–Superior to Minneapolis–St. Paul, Duluth to Thief River Falls, Minnesota, and some summer-only services which relieved The Mountaineer of the local work along its route.

== Presidents ==
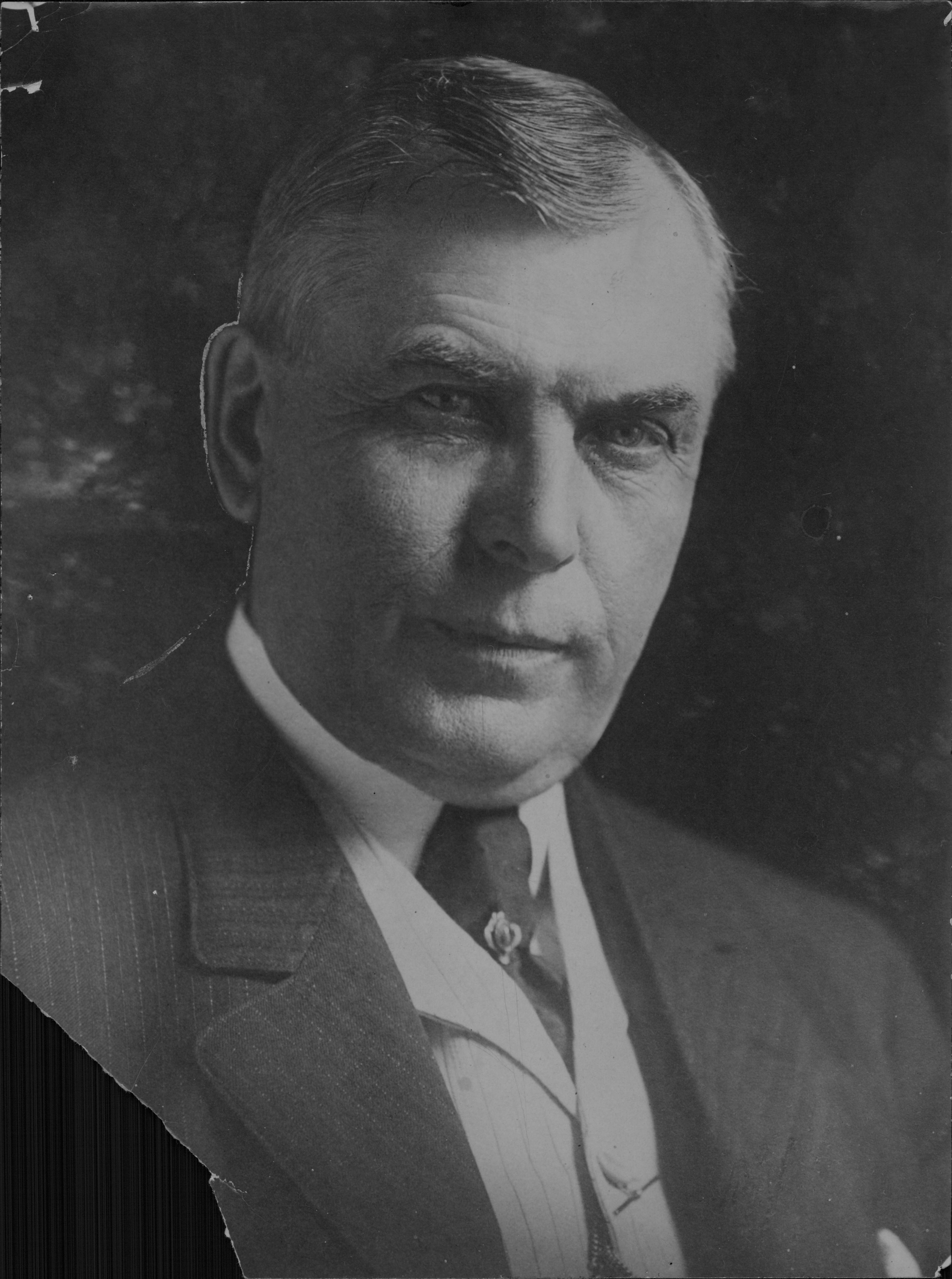
Edmund H. Pennington, president of the Soo Line, c. 1910

The Presidents of the Minneapolis, St. Paul and Sault Ste. Marie Railroad were:

- William D. Washburn, 1883–1889
- Thomas Lowry, 1889–1890, 1892–1909
- F. N. Finney, 1890–1892
- Edmund Pennington, 1909–1922
- George Ray Huntington, 1922–1923
- Clive T. Jaffray, 1924–1937
- George W. Webster, 1937–1944
- H. C. Grout, 1944–1949
- G. Allen MacNamara, 1950–1960

== Timeline ==
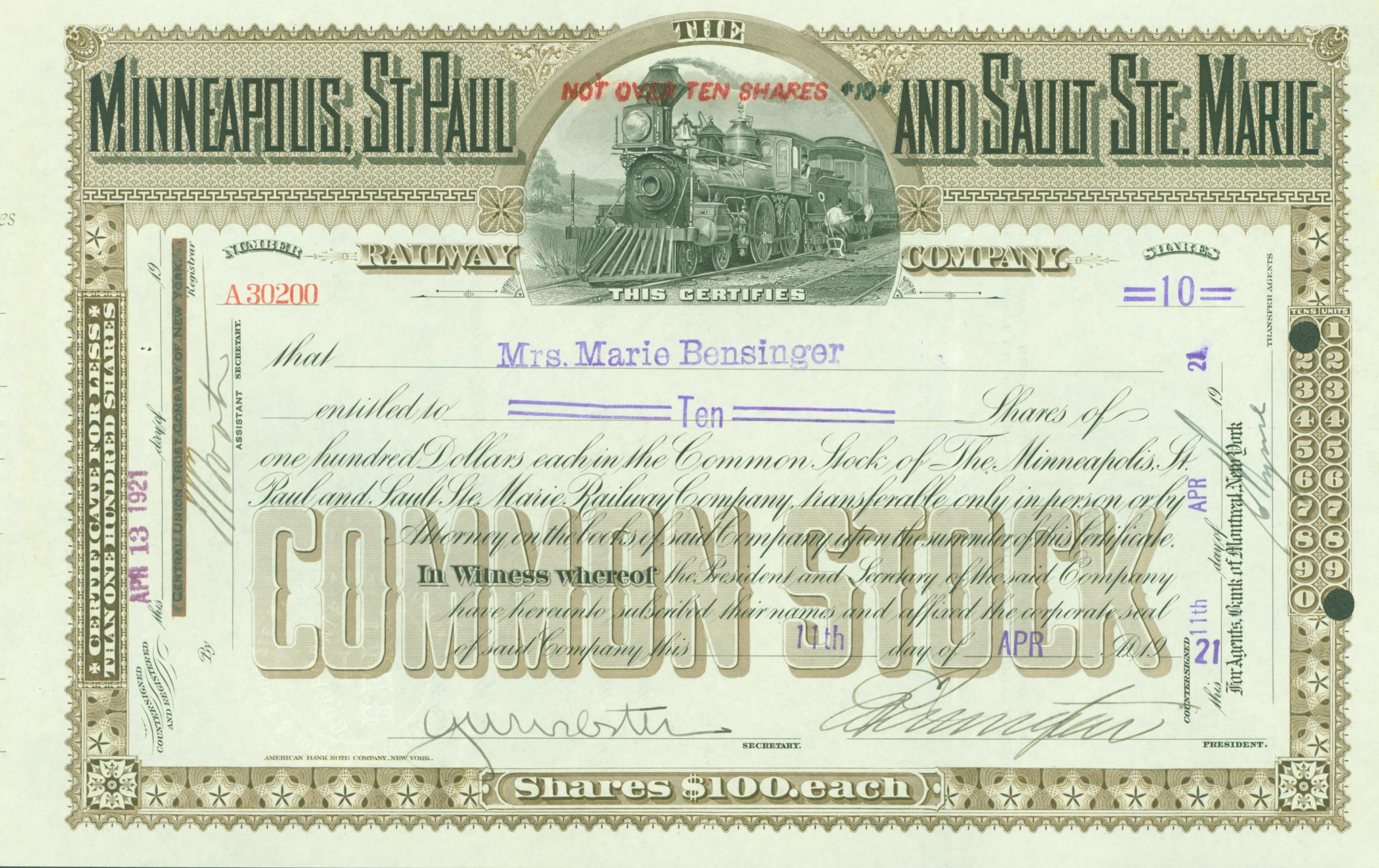
Share of the Minneapolis, St. Paul and Sault Ste. Marie Railway Company, issued 11 April 1921

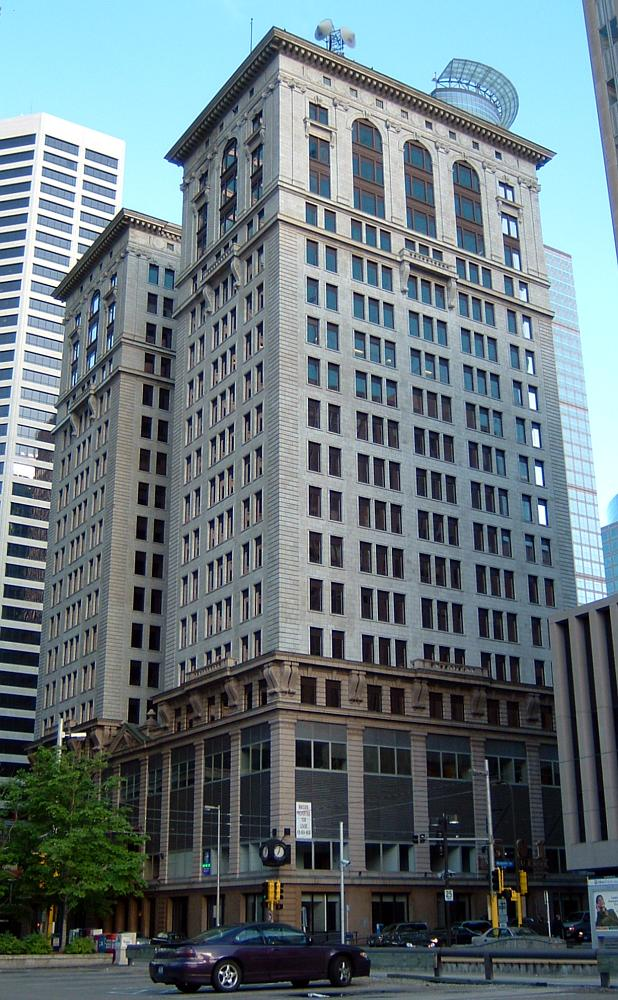
The Soo Line Building in Minneapolis served as company headquarters.

- September 29, 1883: A consortium of flour mill owners in Minneapolis form the Minneapolis, Sault Ste. Marie and Atlantic Railway to build a railroad between its two namesake cities to avoid sending shipments through Chicago.
- February 23, 1884: The presidents of the Minneapolis, Sault Ste. Marie and Atlantic Railway and the Northern Pacific Railway sign an agreement allowing the MSSM&A to use in perpetuity NP track and facilities in Minneapolis and granting an entry to Saint Paul Union Depot. NP's board of directors approved the agreement on March 6.
- March 1884: The first construction contracts are awarded for grading 60 miles (97 km) of line starting from a point near Turtle Lake, Wisconsin. President Washburn receives authorization from the board of directors to place orders for rolling stock.
- November 7, 1884: The ceremonial first train departed Minneapolis to tour from there to Bruce, Wisconsin, the extent of the line that had been constructed so far. On its opening for regular service on November 15, the line measured 46 miles (74 km).
- 1887: Minneapolis is chosen to be the location of the primary repair shops for locomotives and cars. The "Shoreham" Shops were located on a 230-acre (0.93 km^{2}) plot of land at the intersection of Central and 27th Avenues, anchored by a substantial machine and erecting shop capable of overhauling and building locomotives. In 1949 a new diesel shop was built as an addition to the roundhouse, but the shop site was closed in 1990. The other large repair shops were the former Wisconsin Central Railroad (1871–1899) shops at North Fond du Lac, Wisconsin.
- January 5, 1888: The MSSM&A's first train departed Minneapolis with 102 cars of flour divided into five sections for Boston, New York City, Philadelphia, London, England and Glasgow, Scotland.
- June 11, 1888: The Canadian Pacific Railway acquires control of the Minneapolis, Sault Ste. Marie and Atlantic Railway, consolidating it with the Minneapolis and Pacific Railway, Minneapolis and St. Croix Railway, and Aberdeen, Bismarck and North Western Railway to form the Minneapolis, St. Paul and Sault Ste. Marie Railway.
- 1904: The Soo Line acquires the Bismarck, Washburn and Great Falls Railway.
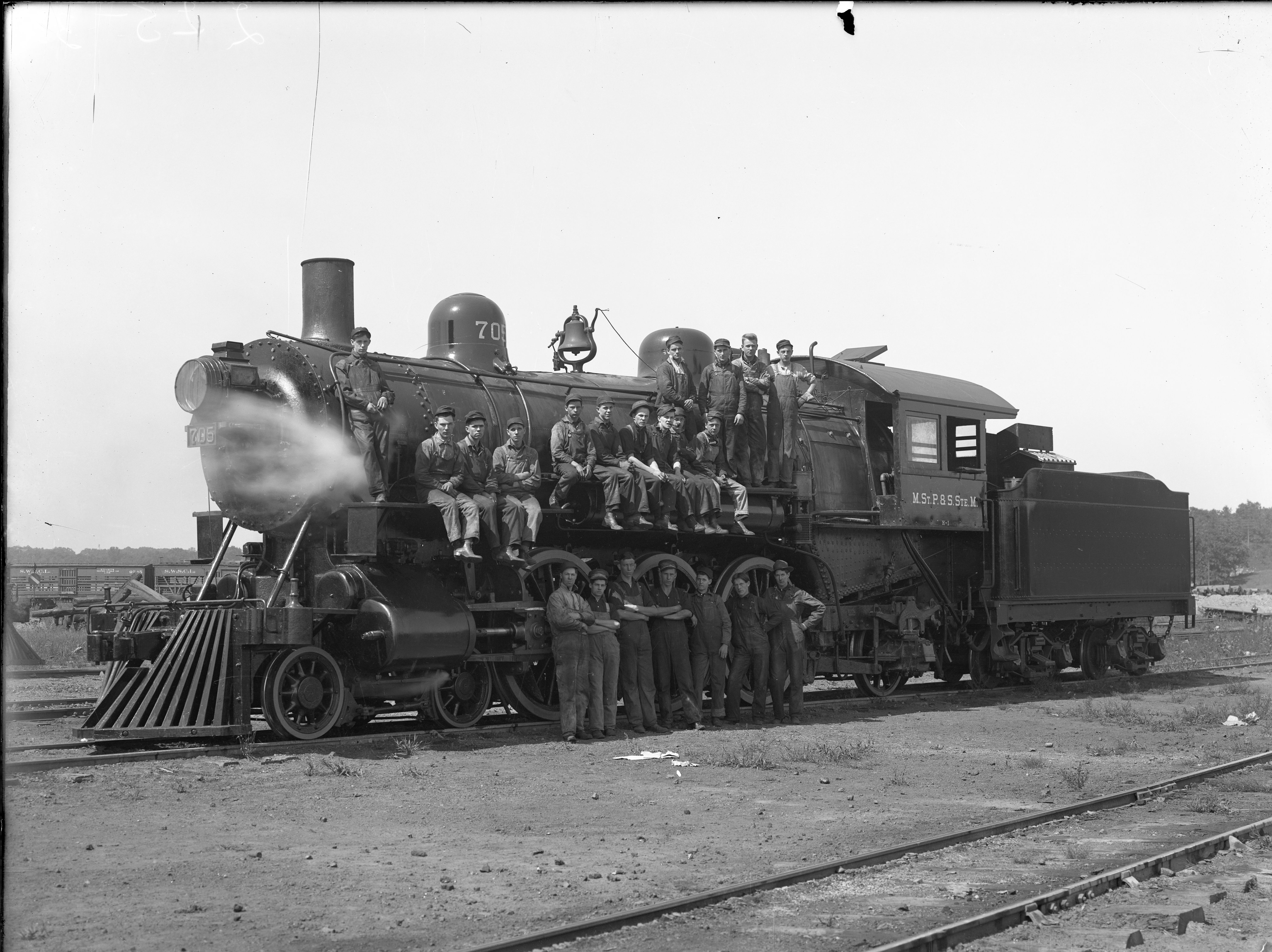
- A New Soo Line Locomotive, Minneapolis, c. 1905
  1908: The Soo Line acquires a majority interest in the Wisconsin Central Railway, and obtains a 99-year lease of the property in 1909.
- 1910: The Soo line acquires the Cuyuna Iron Range Railway.
- 1913: The Soo Line acquires the Minnesota Northwestern Electric Railway and the Fairmount and Veblen Railway.
- 1921: The Soo Line acquires the Wisconsin and Northern Railroad.
- 1932: The Wisconsin Central Railway enters receivership.
- December 31, 1937: The Minneapolis, St. Paul and Sault Ste. Marie Railway files for bankruptcy.
- 1944: The Wisconsin Central Railway enters bankruptcy.
- September 1, 1944: The Soo Line reorganization takes effect, emerging as the Minneapolis, St. Paul and Sault Ste. Marie Railroad.
- 1953: The Valley City Street and Interuban Railway is sold to the Soo Line.
- 1954: The Wisconsin Central emerges from its bankruptcy as the Wisconsin Central Railroad.
- January 1, 1961: The Soo Line Railroad is formed through a merger of the Minneapolis, St. Paul and Sault Ste. Marie Railroad, Wisconsin Central Railroad, and Duluth, South Shore and Atlantic Railroad.

== Preservation ==
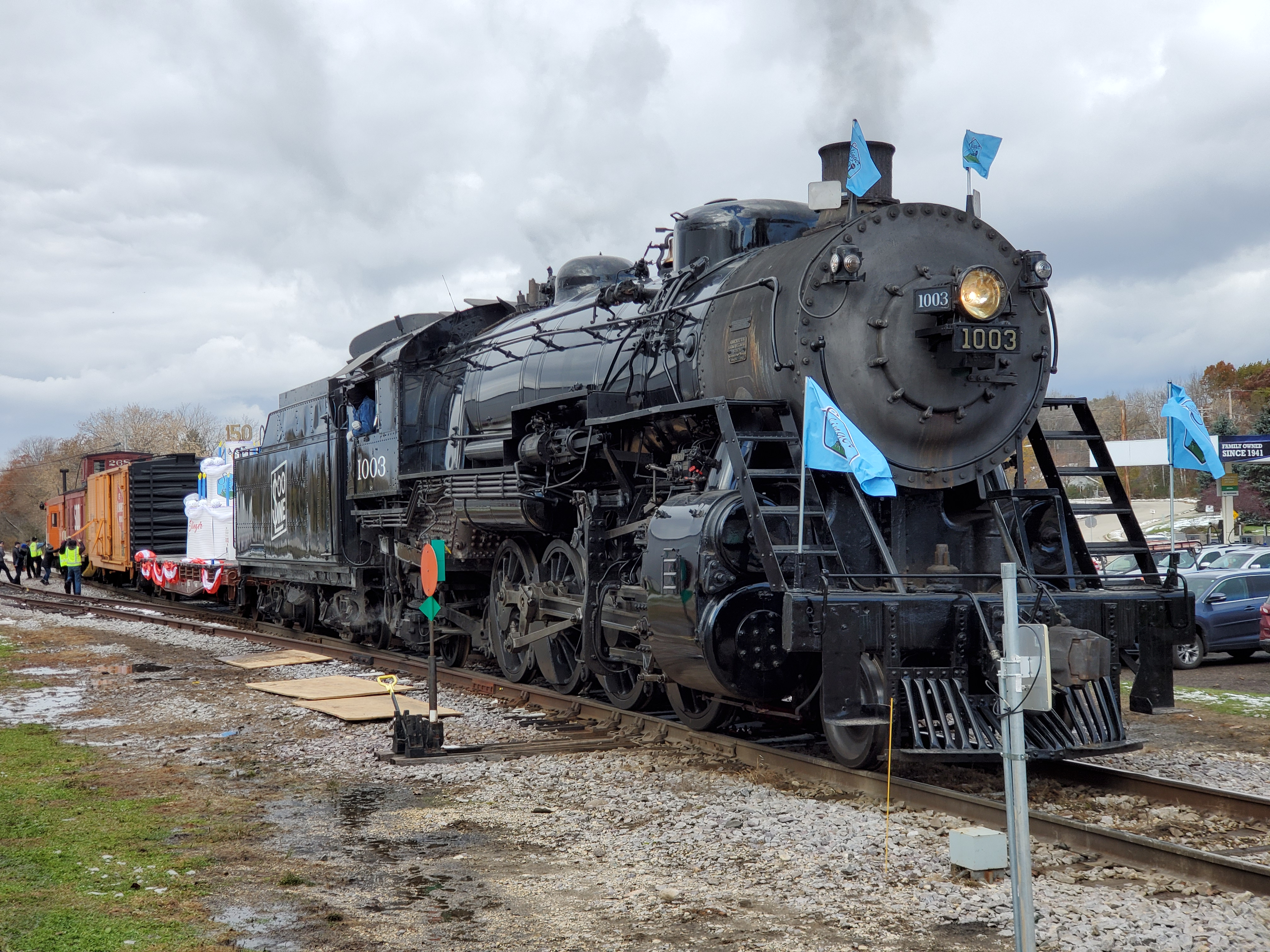
Soo Line 1003, a 2-8-2, in Slinger, Wisconsin, on November 2, 2019.

A number of the railroad's rolling stock have been preserved in museums across the United States, some in operational condition. This list includes some of the more notable equipment.

=== Steam locomotives ===
Steam locomotive No. 2442 is the only example of the Consolidation type 2-8-0 steam locomotive operated by the Soo Line/Wisconsin Central Railroad. It was built in 1911 by the American Locomotive Company in Schenectady, New York. No. 2442 was operated from 1911 to 1954. In 1956 No. 2442 was donated by the Soo Line/Wisconsin Central Railroad to the city of Marshfield, Wisconsin, and relocated to its present site at Wildwood Park

- 321, B class 0-6-0 built in 1887 by the Rhode Island Locomotive Works. Later rebuilt as an 0-6-0 tank engine, numbered X-90 and used as a shop switcher. Rebuilt back to a tender engine in preservation. Static display at Pinecrest Historical Village in Manitowoc, Wisconsin.
- 346, B-4 class 0-6-0 built in 1915 by the American Locomotive Company (ALCO). Static display at Wheels Across the Prairie Museum in Tracy, Minnesota; lettered as Chicago and North Western Railway 850 with a balloon-style stack and cowcatcher-type pilot.
- 353, restored B-4 class 0-6-0 built in 1920 by ALCO. Operational; owned by WMSTR based in Rollag, Minnesota.
- 440, F-8 class 2-8-0 built in 1900 by ALCO; static display at Memorial Park in Harvey, North Dakota.
- 451, F-9 class 2-8-0 built in 1905 by ALCO; static display at the Municipal Court in New Town, North Dakota.
- 730, H-3 class 4-6-2 built in 1911 by ALCO; static display in Gladstone, Michigan.
- 735, H-3 class 4-6-2 built in 1913 by ALCO; static display at the entrance to Roosevelt Park Zoo in Minot, North Dakota.
- 736, H-3 class 4-6-2 built in 1913 by ALCO; static display at Telulah Park in Appleton, Wisconsin.
- 950, G class 2-10-0 built in 1900 by the Baldwin Locomotive Works; the only 2-10-0 owned by Soo Line; static display at the former Soo Line Depot in Ashland, Wisconsin.
- 1003, L-1 class 2-8-2 built in 1913 by ALCO. Operational; owned by Steam Locomotive Heritage Association based in Hartford, Wisconsin.
- 1024, L-4 class 2-8-2 built in 1902 by ALCO. Originally built for the Monon Railroad as J-1 class 504; sold to the Soo Line in 1941 and renumbered 1024. Static display at City Hall in Thief River Falls, Minnesota.
- 2645, E-25 class 4-6-0 built in 1900 by the Brooks Locomotive Works. Originally built for the Wisconsin Central Railway as E-25 Class 247; obtained by the Soo Line in 1909 and renumbered 2645. Static display at the Mid-Continent Railway Museum in North Freedom, Wisconsin.
- 2713, H-21 class 4-6-2 built in 1911 by ALCO; static display at Veterans Memorial Park in Stevens Point, Wisconsin.
- 2714, H-22 class 4-6-2 built in 1914 by ALCO; static display at Lakeside Park in Fond du Lac, Wisconsin.
- 2718, H-23 class 4-6-2 built in 1923 by ALCO; static display at the National Railroad Museum in Green Bay, Wisconsin.
- 2719, H-23 class 4-6-2 built in 1923 by ALCO; pulled the Soo Line's last steam-powered train in excursion service in 1959. Operated in excursion service 1998-2013; static display awaiting overhaul at the Lake Superior Railroad Museum in Duluth, Minnesota.
