= Soo Line 2719 =

Preserved American 4-6-2 steam locomotive

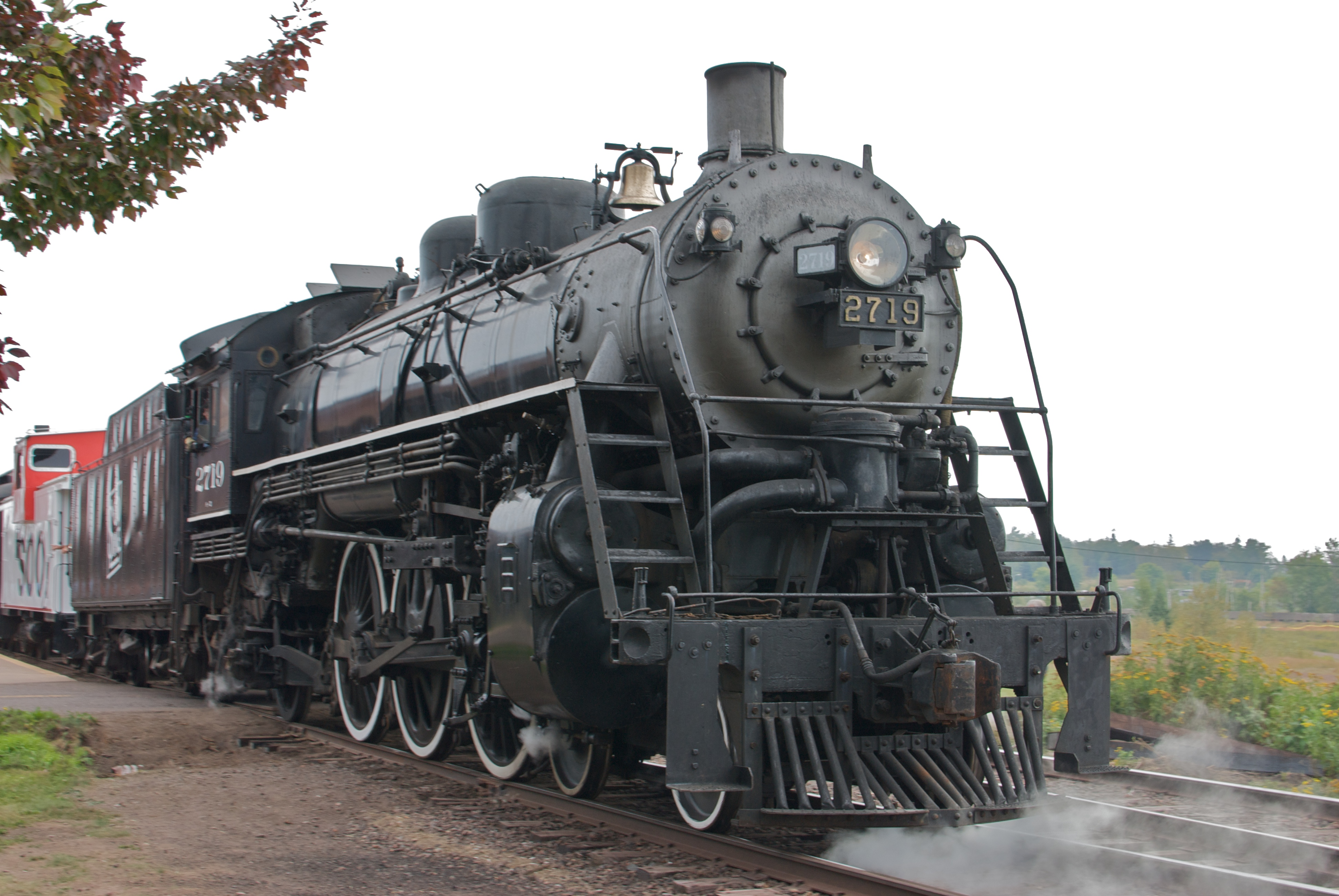
- Soo Line No. 2719 steams into Two Harbors, Minnesota on September 20, 2009
Type and origin
- Power type: Steam
- Builder: American Locomotive Company
- Serial number: 64314
- Model: H-23
- Build date: May 1923
- Rebuild date: 1954–1955
Specifications
- Configuration
  - Whyte: 4-6-2
  - UIC: 2′C1′ h2
- Gauge: 4 ft 8 1/2 in (1,435 mm) standard gauge
- Leading dia.: 36 in (914 mm)
- Driver dia.: 75 in (1,905 mm)
- Trailing dia.: 50 in (1,270 mm)
- Wheelbase: 31 ft 10 in (9.70 m)
- Length: Loco: 46 ft 7 1/2 in (14.21 m), Loco & tender: 82 ft 6 3/4 in (25.17 m)
- Width: 10 ft 5 in (3.18 m)
- Height: 15 ft 3 1/2 in (4.66 m)
- Adhesive weight: 172,400 lb (78,200 kilograms; 78.2 tonnes)
- Loco weight: 281,080 lb (127,500 kilograms; 127.50 tonnes)
- Total weight: 497,080 lb (225,470 kilograms; 225.47 tonnes)
- Fuel type: Coal
- Fuel capacity: 35,000 lb (16,000 kilograms; 16 tonnes)
- Water cap.: 12,000 US gal (45,000 L; 10,000 imp gal)
- Firebox
  - Grate area: 52.75 sq ft (4.901 m^{2})
- Boiler pressure: 200 psi (1.38 MPa)
- Feedwater heater: Worthington SCA-2A
- Heating surface
  - Firebox: 207 sq ft (19.2 m^{2})
  - Flues: 3,172 sq ft (294.7 m^{2})
  - Total surface: 4,639 sq ft (431.0 m^{2})
- Superheater
  - Heating area: 1,260 sq ft (117 m^{2})
- Cylinders: Two, outside
- Cylinder size: 25 in × 26 in (635 mm × 660 mm)
- Valve gear: Walschaerts
- Valve type: Piston valves
- Loco brake: Air
- Train brakes: Air
- Couplers: Knuckle
Performance figures
- Tractive effort: 36,833 lbf (163.84 kN)
- Factor of adh.: 4.68
Career
- Operators: Minneapolis, St. Paul and Sault Ste. Marie Railroad; Locomotive and Tower Preservation Fund, Ltd; Wisconsin Great Northern Railroad; Lake Superior Railroad Museum
- Class: H-23
- Number in class: 2 of 6
- Numbers: SOO 2719
- Locale: Wisconsin and Minnesota, United States
- Delivered: May 1923
- Retired: June 21, 1959
- Preserved: 1960
- Restored: July 27, 1998
- Current owner: Lake Superior Railroad Museum
- Disposition: On temporary static display, awaiting 1,472-day inspection and overhaul
- Soo Line Locomotive 2719
- U.S. National Register of Historic Places
- Location: Duluth, Minnesota
- Built by: American Locomotive Company
- NRHP reference No.: 93001453
- Added to NRHP: January 10, 1994

Soo Line 2719 is a H-23 class 4-6-2 "Pacific" type steam locomotive, built in May 1923 by the American Locomotive Company (ALCO) for use on passenger trains operated by the Minneapolis, St. Paul and Sault Ste. Marie Railway ("Soo Line"). No. 2719 was used to haul the Soo Line's last steam-powered train, a June 21, 1959 round-trip excursion between Minneapolis, Minnesota and Ladysmith, Wisconsin. It was then displayed in Eau Claire, Wisconsin until 1996. It was restored and operated in excursion service from 1998 until 2013 when its boiler certificate expired. Today, the locomotive remains on temporary static display in Duluth, Minnesota where it is currently awaiting an FRA overhaul to return to service.

== History ==
=== Revenue service ===
No. 2719 was built by the American Locomotive Company (ALCO) in May 1923 in Schenectady, New York. It was one of 6 H-23 class 4-6-2 "Pacific" type steam locomotives built for the Minneapolis, St. Paul and Sault Ste. Marie Railroad, better known as the Soo Line Railroad. At some point in the mid-1940s, the locomotive became one of a few H-23 locomotives to be equipped with an experimental Worthington feedwater heater on the pilot deck, and it was ultimately deemed a failure. The locomotive operated until the mid-1950s when it was overhauled and put into storage. It was brought out of storage to haul the very last steam trains on Soo Line's trackage in June 1959.

It is estimated that No. 2719 traveled more than 3 million miles during its time on the Soo Line. The locomotive was officially retired from revenue service on June 21, 1959. It was subsequently donated to the City of Eau Claire, Wisconsin in 1960, where it was placed on static display in Carson Park for the next thirty-seven years.

=== Excursion service ===
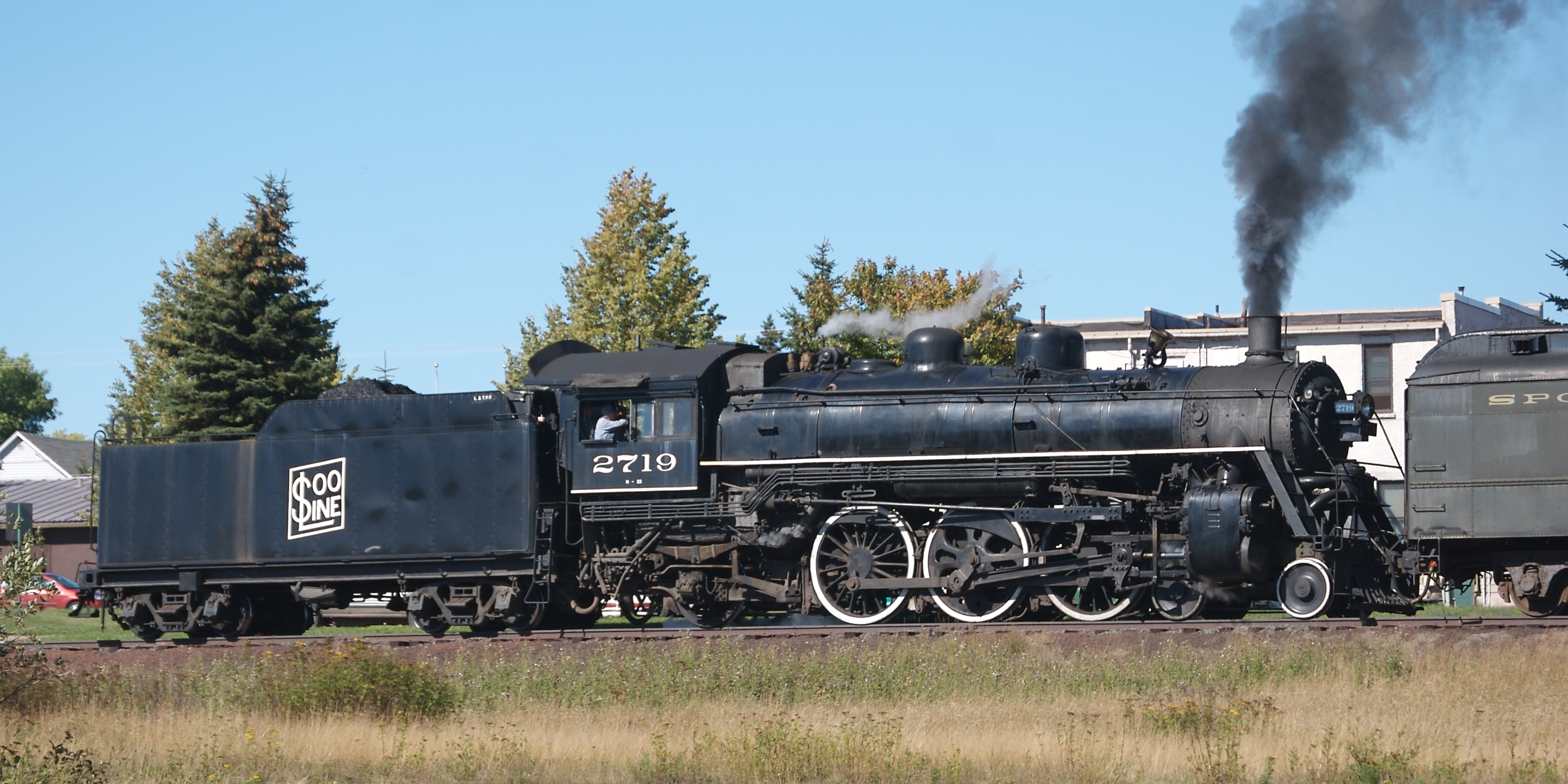
Soo Line hauling a passenger excursion in 2007.

On May 23, 1996, a fundraising dinner, entitled "An Evening in the Club Car", was held at the Holiday Inn Convention Center in Eau Claire to benefit a potential restoration effort on No. 2719. The locomotive was removed from Carson Park, and restoration work was undertaken by the Locomotive and Tower Preservation Fund, Ltd. After a highly aggressive restoration schedule went on, work was completed and the engine made its first test run on July 27, 1998. The engine's first inaugural excursion for the L&TPF took place that same month. At SteamFest '98, it ran a triple-header excursion with Northern Pacific 328 and Soo Line 1003.

In June 2000, No. 2719 was moved to the Wisconsin Great Northern Railroad in Spooner. It operated during the summer months in Spooner, until the Wisconsin Central was bought out by the Canadian National Railway in 2001.

In 2005, discussions were held to move the locomotive to the Lake Superior Railroad Museum (LSRM) in Duluth, Minnesota, which operates the North Shore Scenic Railroad (NSSR). With assistance from the L&TPF, Ltd., the museum moved No. 2719 to the LSRM on December 17, 2006.

On May 11, 2013, No. 2719 along with Milwaukee Road 261, ran several excursion trains for National Train Day at LSRM.

No. 2719's boiler flue time was to expire on July 31, but its flue time was extended so that it could operate into late summer of 2013. It pulled its final excursion on September 14. Afterwards, the locomotive was to have gotten its FRA-required 1,472-day rebuild, however, because of ownership disputes, it was drained to the LSRM for display instead. In June 2015, No. 2719 was officially purchased by the LSRM.

After deciding to restore Duluth & Northeastern 28 back to operating condition, the museum abandoned plans to restore No. 2719 back to operation. This sparked the L&TPF to seek other options for No. 2719. On February 21, 2015, the Locomotive & Tower Preservation Fund approached the City of Eau Claire and offered to sell 2719 back to the city for $1, with the city also covering the cost of the $135,000 shelter to house the locomotive. It came at great surprise to the LSRM, as they were unaware of the talk to move the engine back to permanent outdoor display. The L&TPF weren't interested in renewing the lease with the LSRM, which was to expire in 2015.

The LSRM was originally seeking $305,000 in 2011 to restore it back to operation after its flue time expired in 2013, however, the museum announced it was restoring a different steam locomotive (that the museum owned) to operate in time for the 2016 operating season, postponing hopes of bringing No. 2719 back under steam.

On February 24, 2015, the city decided it wanted up to two months to make its decision on No. 2719. It was likely that the city would buy No. 2719 for $1, then sell it back to the LSRM for $2, as the city council seemed to agree they'd rather have No. 2719 be restored to operation in the future than sitting on permanent static display.

On May 11, the city of Eau Claire held a community meeting to debate what the city's intentions for the locomotive would be, while some community members argued the locomotive should be returned to its home in Eau Claire, while others suggested that the LSRM would make a better home for No. 2719.

The city council discussed No. 2719's fate on May 12, the council could not reach a majority, and another debate was planned for June, however, the council wanted the first right of refusal should No. 2719 be sold by the LSRM at some point in the future.

Eau Claire's "buy-back agreement" lasted three years for the city to find any way to restore and return the locomotive to the city.

In June 2018, the city of Eau Claire voted for an extension to 2019 for the right to repurchase the locomotive and return it to Eau Claire, the city then purchased the locomotive back from Duluth for $4 in August, and explored options to return the locomotive to Eau Claire from Duluth.

However, in April 2019, the City of Eau Claire decided to open leasing and/or purchasing options for the locomotive after realizing the substantial cost to relocate and protect the locomotive. The LSRM in Duluth and city council members began new negotiations to keep the locomotive in Duluth and to alternate operating cycles with D&NE 28.

On October 22, the Eau Claire City Council voted to sell the locomotive back to the LSRM for $8, with the hope that the museum will return it back to service.

== 1999 accident ==
- On May 9, 1999, No. 2719 was being stored after finishing a series of excursions, when the fireman's side was struck by a Wisconsin Central freight consist led by SD45 No. 6623, damaging a number of components, including the air compressor, boiler, and running gear. The locomotive was subsequently repaired and brought back to service.

== Other H-23 class locomotives ==
There were six H-23 class locomotives built in May 1923. 2719 and 2718 are preserved.

- 2718 - On display at the National Railroad Museum in Green Bay, Wisconsin
- 2720 - Scrapped at United States Steel, July 19, 1951
- 2721 - Scrapped at Purdy Company, November 13, 1950
- 2722 - Scrapped at American Iron & Supply, December 28, 1954
- 2723 - Scrapped at Purdy Company, November 13, 1950

== Bibliography ==
- Rice, Kevin L. (1993). "Engineering Report, Soo Line Locomotive #2719". Engineering Report, Soo Line Locomotive #2719. K.L. Rice.
- Glischinski, Steve (February 1997). "Soo Line 2-8-2 back in steam". Trains Magazine. 57 (2): 24–25.
