= Soo Line 2713 =

Preserved American 4-6-2 locomotive

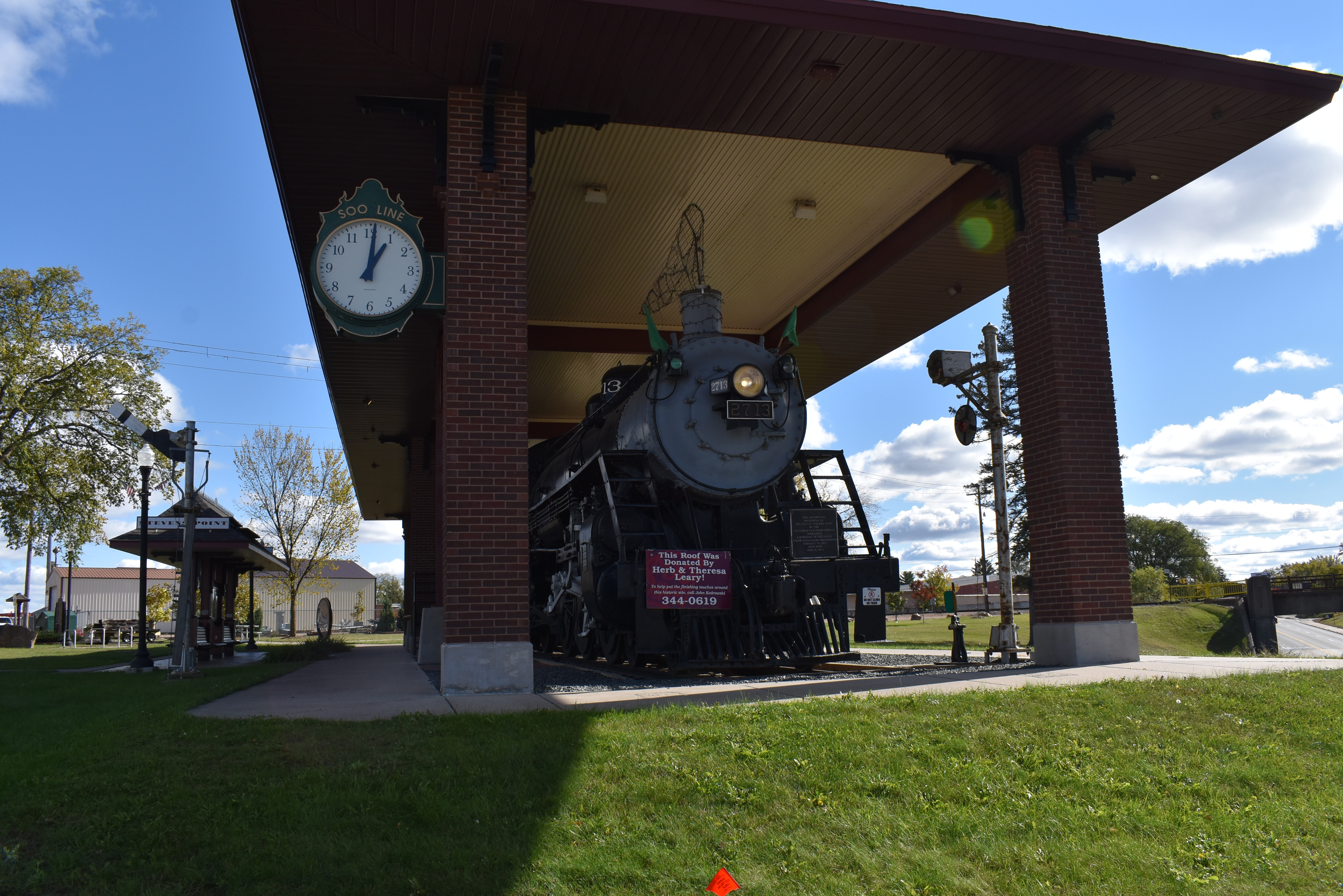
- Soo Line No. 2713 on display at Stevens Point, WI in 2021
Type and origin
- Power type: Steam
- Builder: American Locomotive Company
- Serial number: 49796
- Build date: May 1911
Specifications
- Configuration
  - Whyte: 4-6-2
  - UIC: 2′C1′ h2
- Gauge: 4 ft 8 1/2 in (1,435 mm)
- Driver dia.: 75 in (1,905 mm)
- Loco weight: 258,000 lb (117.0 metric tons)
- Fuel type: Coal
- Boiler pressure: 200 lbf/in^{2} (1.38 MPa)
- Cylinders: Two, outside
- Cylinder size: 25 in × 26 in (635 mm × 660 mm)
- Loco brake: Independent Air
- Train brakes: Automatic Air
Performance figures
- Tractive effort: 36,833 lbf (163.84 kN)
Career
- Operators: Wisconsin Central Railway, Minneapolis, St. Paul and Sault Ste.Marie Railway
- Class: H-21
- Number in class: 10th of 10
- Retired: 1955
- Disposition: On static display

Soo Line 2713 is an H-21 class 4-6-2 "Pacific" type steam locomotive, built for the Wisconsin Central Railway in May 1911. The WC had fallen under the control of the Minneapolis, St. Paul and Sault Ste. Marie Railway (“Soo Line”) in 1909, and the locomotive fleets of both railroads were operated in a single pool.

The 2713 was used to power the Soo Line and Wisconsin Central passenger trains in Wisconsin, Minnesota and North Dakota. It was retired in 1955, and since 1957, has been on display in Veterans Memorial Park in Stevens Point, Wisconsin, United States. With it is Soo Line Caboose 99052, built in 1908 for the Wisconsin Central Railway, their No. 158.
