= Soo Line 2718 =

Preserved American 4-6-2 locomotive

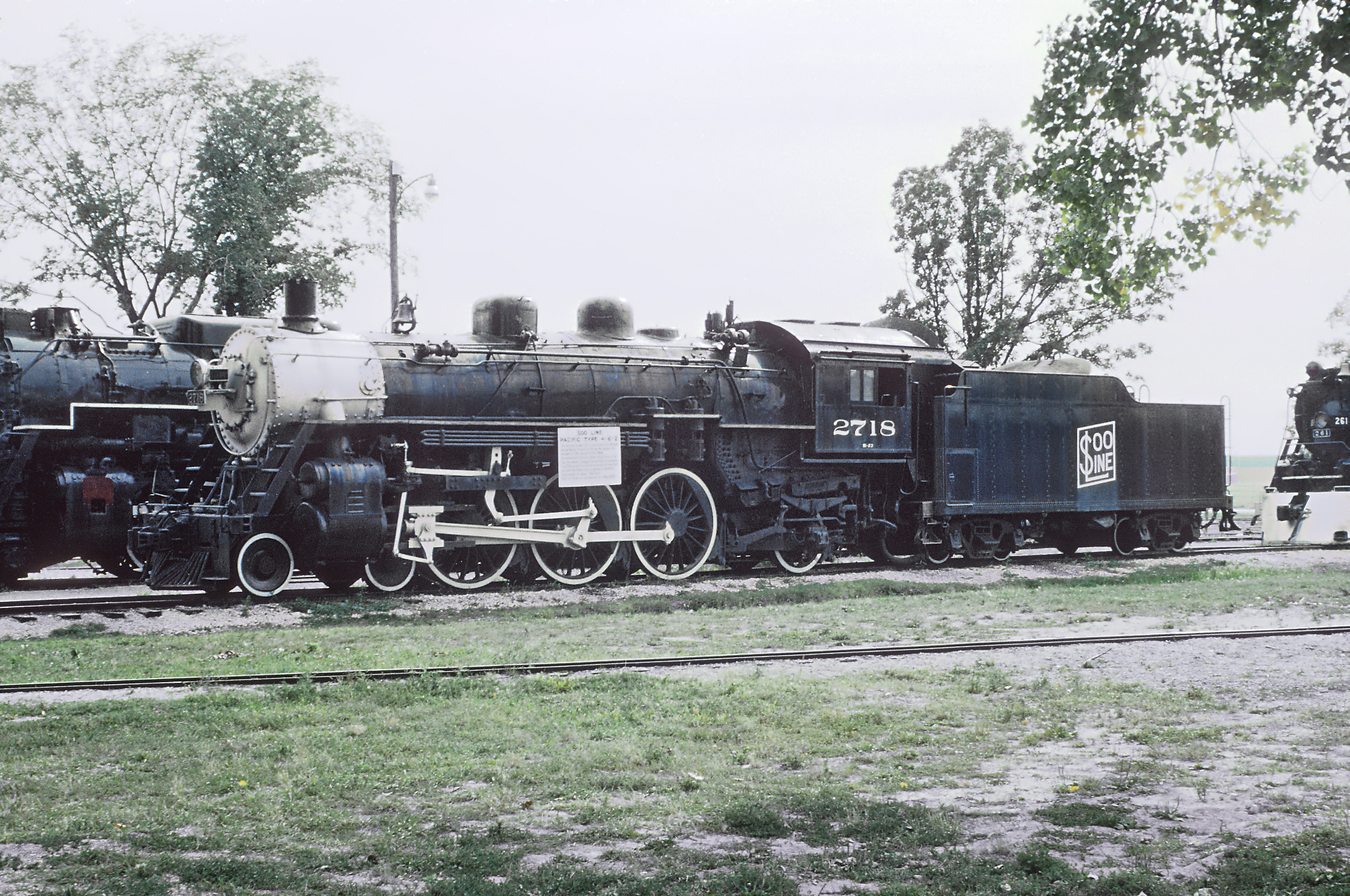
- Soo Line 2718 on display at the National Railroad Museum, September 1963
Type and origin
- Power type: Steam
- Builder: American Locomotive Company
- Serial number: 64313
- Model: H-23
- Build date: May 1923
Specifications
- Configuration
  - Whyte: 4-6-2
  - UIC: 2′C1′ h2
- Gauge: 4 ft 8 1/2 in (1,435 mm)
- Leading dia.: 36 in (914 mm)
- Driver dia.: 75 in (1,905 mm)
- Trailing dia.: 50 in (1,270 mm)
- Wheelbase: 31 ft 10 in (9.70 m)
- Length: Loco only: 46 ft 7 1/2 in (14.21 m); Loco & tender: 82 ft 6 3/4 in (25.17 m)
- Width: 10 ft 5 in (3.18 m)
- Height: 15 ft 3 1/2 in (4.66 m)
- Adhesive weight: 172,400 lb (78.2 tonnes)
- Loco weight: 281,080 lb (127.5 tonnes)
- Total weight: 497,080 lb (225.5 tonnes)
- Fuel type: Coal
- Fuel capacity: 35,000 lb (15.9 tonnes)
- Water cap.: 12,000 US gal (45,000 L; 10,000 imp gal)
- Firebox
  - Grate area: 52.75 sq ft (4.901 m^{2})
- Boiler pressure: 200 lbf/in^{2} (1.38 MPa)
- Feedwater heater: Worthington SCA-2A
- Heating surface
  - Firebox: 207 sq ft (19.2 m^{2})
  - Flues: 3,172 sq ft (294.7 m^{2})
  - Total surface: 4,639 sq ft (431.0 m^{2})
- Superheater
  - Heating area: 1,260 sq ft (117 m^{2})
- Cylinders: Two, outside
- Cylinder size: 25 in × 26 in (635 mm × 660 mm)
- Valve gear: Walschaerts
- Valve type: Piston valves
- Loco brake: Air
- Train brakes: Air
- Couplers: Knuckle
Performance figures
- Tractive effort: 36,833 lbf (163.84 kN)
- Factor of adh.: 4.68
Career
- Operators: Minneapolis, St. Paul and Sault Ste. Marie Railroad; National Railroad Museum
- Class: H-23
- Number in class: 1st of 6
- Numbers: SOO 2718
- Delivered: May 1923
- Retired: February 1958 (revenue service); 1962 (excursion service)
- Preserved: March 1958
- Restored: 1959
- Current owner: National Railroad Museum
- Disposition: On static display

Soo Line 2718 is a H-23 class 4-6-2 "Pacific" type steam locomotive, built in May 1923 by the American Locomotive Company (ALCO) for the Minneapolis, St. Paul and Sault Ste. Marie Railway (the "Soo Line"), but operated by their subsidiary, the Wisconsin Central Railway.

== History ==
No. 2718 was built in May 1923 by the American Locomotive Company (ALCO) in Schenectady, New York. It was one of six H-23 class Pacific steam locomotives built for the Soo Line. In the Soo Line's naming scheme, 'H' indicated the Pacific wheel arrangement. The H-23 were their last Pacific class built. No. 2718 was mostly assigned by the Soo Line to haul passenger trains between Chicago, Illinois, Minneapolis, Minnesota, and Winnipeg, Manitoba.

No. 2718 was retired from revenue service in February 1958, and shortly thereafter, it was donated to the newly-established National Railroad Museum of Green Bay, Wisconsin. The following month, No. 2718, along with Milwaukee Road 261, were maneuvered into the museum's site in W. D. Cooke Park of Ashwaubenon, and they became the museum's first exhibits. Since No. 2718 was still in operating condition, the museum would occasionally use it to move other locomotives, rolling stock, and other equipment around the property until the early 1960s. As of 2026, No. 2718 sits on static display inside of the National Railroad Museum's Victor McCormick Train Pavilion barn.

== Other H-23 class locomotives ==
There were six H-23 class locomotives built in May 1923. One of them is on display.

- 2719 - Preserved at Lake Superior Museum in Duluth, Minnesota
- 2720 - Scrapped at United States Steel, July 19, 1951
- 2721 - Scrapped at Purdy Company, November 13, 1950
- 2722 - Scrapped at American Iron & Supply, December 28, 1954
- 2723 - Scrapped at Purdy Company, November 13, 1950
