= List of preserved EMD GP30 locomotives =

This is a summary, listing every EMD GP30 locomotive in preservation.

== GP30 (EMD-built) ==
Photograph	Works no.	Locomotive	Build date	Former operators	Retire date	Disposition and location	Notes	References
	27114	Reading 5513	March 1962	Reading Company (RDG); Conrail (CR); Blue Mountain and Reading Railroad (BMR)	-	On static display at the Reading Railroad Heritage Museum in Hamburg, Pennsylvania		
	27140	Denver and Rio Grande Western 3006	April 1962	Denver and Rio Grande Western Railroad (DRGW)	-	On static display at the Forney Transportation Museum in Denver, Colorado		
	27222	Denver and Rio Grande Western 3011	May 1962	Denver and Rio Grande Western Railroad (DRGW); OmniTRAX (OMLX)	December 1994	On static display at the Colorado Railroad Museum in Golden, Colorado	Used as the lead unit in the film Runaway!	
	28043	Denver and Rio Grande Western 3014	January 1963	Denver and Rio Grande Western Railroad (DRGW); Cimarron Valley Railroad (CVR); Klarr Locomotive Industries LLC	-	Stored Operational at the Utah Transit Authority's Frontrunner Shops	Owned by the Promontory Chapter of the National Railway Historical Society	
	27355	Norfolk and Western 522	June 1962	Norfolk and Western Railway (N&W); Railroad Passenger Car and Numbering Bureau (RPCX); Cycle Systems, Inc. (CSIX)	August 20, 1991	Operational, Owned by the Roanoke Chapter National Railroad Historical Society in Roanoke, Virginia	First and sole surviving GP30 built for the Norfolk and Western.	
	27369	Norfolk and Western 536	June 1962	Norfolk and Western Railway (N&W)	1991-1993	Static display in derelict condition on the Great Smoky Mountain Railroad.	Used in staged train wreck during filming of The Fugitive.	
	27553	Union Pacific 844	August 1962	Union Pacific Railroad (UP)	January 30, 1989	Operational at the Nevada State Railroad Museum in Boulder City, Nevada		
	27753	Louisville and Nashville 1030	May 1963	Louisville and Nashville Railroad (LN); Seaboard System (SBD); CSX Transportation (CSXT); Waldens Ridge Railroad (WRRX)	-	Operational at the Southern Appalachia Railway Museum in Oak Ridge, Tennessee		
	27894	Nickel Plate Road 900	November 1962	Nickel Plate Road (NKP); Norfolk and Western Railway (N&W)	March 7, 1991	On static display at the Mad River and Nickel Plate Museum in Bellevue, Ohio		
	27895	Nickel Plate Road 901	November 1962	Nickel Plate Road (NKP); Norfolk and Western Railway (N&W); Norfolk Southern Railway (NS); Indiana and Ohio Railway (IORY)	-	Operational at the Lebanon Mason and Monroe Railroad in Lebanon, Ohio		
	27896	Nickel Plate Road 902	November 1962	Nickel Plate Road (NKP); Norfolk and Western Railway (N&W); Norfolk Southern Railway (NS); Great Miami Short Line Railroad (GMRY)	-	Operational at the Cincinnati Scenic Railway in Lebanon, Ohio		
	28053	SPTX 3024	February 1963	Denver and Rio Grande Western Railroad (DRGW); Progress Rail; National Railway Equipment Company (NREX); Cimarron Valley Railroad (CVR); Lambert Rail Equipment Leasing (LREX)	May 27, 1995	Stored at the Midland Railway Historical Association (MRHA) in Baldwin City, Kansas		
	28141	Conrail 2233	April 1963	Pennsylvania Railroad (PRR); Penn Central (PC); Conrail (CR)	1984	On static display at the Railroad Museum of Pennsylvania in Strasburg, Pennsylvania	Previously repainted in PRR livery when owned by a private owner affiliated with West Shore Railroad Corp.	
	28157	Western Maryland Scenic 501	May 1963	Pennsylvania Railroad (PRR); Penn Central (PC); Conrail (CR)	April 11, 1991	Operational at the Western Maryland Scenic Railroad in Cumberland, Maryland		
	28158	New Hope and Ivyland 2198	May 1963	Pennsylvania Railroad (PRR); Penn Central (PC); Conrail (CR)	April 11, 1991	Operational at the New Hope and Ivyland Railroad in New Hope, Pennsylvania		
	28178	Cotton Belt 5006	February 1963	St. Louis Southwestern Railway (SSW)	March 28, 1985	Stored at the Arkansas Railroad Museum in Pine Bluff, Arkansas		
	28335	Wisconsin Central 715	May 1963	Soo Line (SOO); Wisconsin Central (WC)	-	On static display at the National Railroad Museum in Green Bay, Wisconsin		
	28342	Soo Line 700	March 1963	Soo Line (SOO)	-	Operational at the Lake Superior Railroad Museum in Duluth, Minnesota		
	28564	Southern 2594	October 1963	Southern Railway (SOU); Norfolk Southern Railway (NS)	-	Out of service at the Tennessee Valley Railroad Museum in Chattanooga, Tennessee	On loan from the Southeastern Railway Museum.	
	28571	Southern 2601	October 1963	Southern Railway (SOU); Norfolk Southern Railway (NS)	1991	Operational at the North Carolina Transportation Museum in Spencer, North Carolina		

== Rebuilt GP30 (EMD-built) ==
Photograph	Works no.	Locomotive	Build date	Model	Rebuilder	Rebuild date	Former operators	Retire date	Disposition and location	Notes	References
	27640	Baltimore and Ohio 6923	November 1962	GP30M			Baltimore and Ohio Railroad (B&O); Chessie System (B&O/C&O/WM); CSX Transportation (CSX); Nebraska, Kansas & Colorado RailNet (NKCR); Raritan Central Railway (RCRY)	1990s (CSX)	Operational at the Cincinnati Scenic Railway in Lebanon, Ohio	Currently painted in a semiquincentennial livery, to be restored to B&O "Sunburst" livery	
	27672	Chessie 6955	November 1962	GP30M			Baltimore and Ohio Railroad (B&O); Chessie System (B&O/C&O/WM); CSX Transportation (CSX); Eastern Idaho Railroad (EIRR); WATCO Rail Services (WAMX); National Railway Equipment Company (NREX)	-	Under restoration at the Cincinnati Scenic Railway in Lebanon, Ohio		
	27690	Branson Scenic 99	January 1963	GP30M			Baltimore and Ohio Railroad (B&O); Chessie System (B&O/C&O/WM); CSX Transportation (CSX)	-	Operational at the Branson Scenic Railway in Branson, Missouri		
	28092	Great Smoky Mountains 2467	May 1963	GP30u	Atchison, Topeka and Santa Fe Railway (AT&SF)	August 1983	Atchison, Topeka and Santa Fe Railway (AT&SF); Burlington Northern and Santa Fe Railway (BNSF); Larry's Truck and Electric (LTEX)	-	Operational at the Great Smoky Mountains Railroad (GSMR) at Bryson City, North Carolina		
	28499	Horizon Rail 3002	September 1963	GP30m	Chesapeake and Ohio Railway (C&O)	1964	Chesapeake and Ohio Railway (C&O); Chessie System (C&O); CSX Transportation (CSX); Ohio Central Railroad (OHCR); Arizona and California Railroad (ARZC); Scoular Bishop Grain Company (SCOX); Horizon Rail (HLRX); Dieselmotive Company, Inc. (BUGX)	-	Stored at the Midland Railway Historical Association (MRHA) in Baldwin City, Kansas		

== GP30 (GMD-built) ==
Works no.	Locomotive	Build date	Former operators	Retire date	Disposition and location	Notes	References
A2006	Canadian Pacific 5000	March 1963	Canadian Pacific Railway (CP); Canadian Rockies Railroad Museum (CRRM); Canadian Rockies Railroad Museum Foundation (CRRMF); Alberta Railway Museum (ARM)	June 1998	Declared surplus to the Alberta Railway Museum (ARM)'s collection, stored in Edmonton, Alberta		
