= Soo Line 700 =

Diesel Locomotive

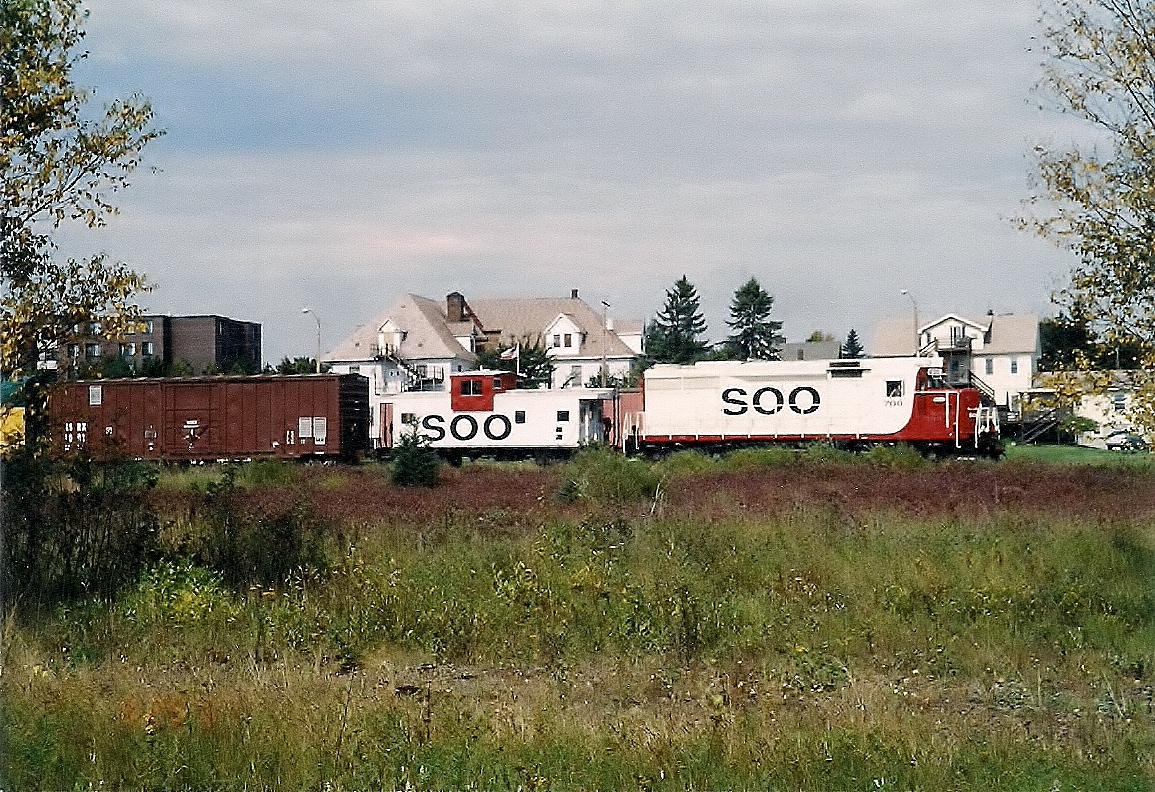
- Soo Line 700 in Two Harbors, Minnesota in 2007
Type and origin
- Power type: Diesel
- Builder: Electro-Motive Diesel (EMD)
- Order number: 7655
- Serial number: 28342
- Model: EMD GP30
- Build date: March 1963
Specifications
- Gauge: 4 ft 8 1/2 in (1,435 mm)
Performance figures
- Power output: 2,250 hp (1,680 kW)
Career
- Operators: Soo Line Railroad
- Numbers: 700 (SOO)
- Locale: Duluth, Minnesota, United States
- Delivered: 1963
- Retired: 2001
- Restored: 2005
- Current owner: Lake Superior Railroad Museum
- Disposition: Operational

Soo Line 700 is a restored EMD GP30 diesel locomotive originally owned by the Soo Line Railroad. It was built in 1963 as a part of the "second generation" diesel power that replaced older locomotives. It is now owned by the Lake Superior Railroad Museum for use on their North Shore Scenic Railroad.

== History ==
Soo Line 700 was built towards the end of the GP30's short production life between 1961 and 1963. It was one of 948 built by Electro-Motive Division (EMD) of General Motors in La Grange, Illinois. GP (General Purpose) was the beginning of the "second generation" of diesel locomotive power to replace older diesels that led to the demise of steam power. GP30s are recognizable with their higher cab roofs, sometimes called "hump roofs".

Soo Line ordered 22 GP30s in 1963, for the cost of $4 million, but were willing to make the investment to replace 33 older locomotives. As part of the deal, the Soo Line traded in 21 of its 22-strong fleet of Alco FA-1 locomotives; it would have traded in 20 of them, but decided to rebuild GP9 2411, rather than trade it in. So it was that a passenger EMD F7b unit (the 500C), which had been written-off after a collision at White Bear, Minnesota in November 1961 was used a trade-in credit against the 700 (The 500C was the first diesel to be retired; the other engine in the consist (GP9 550) was repaired and become the first locomotive to wear the new red and gray color scheme). In order to save money the Alco's trucks with their General Electric traction motors were re-used; in order to maintain conformity, another pair of trucks was obtained from a Chicago scrapyard. This decision would come back to haunt the railroad's conservative management, as it would become a maintenance headache, especially in winter months.

GP30s were highly utilized until higher horsepower locomotives replaced their mainline status in the 1980s. Then, many Soo Line GP30s were used for secondary or local service. In 1987, seventeen of their remaining nineteen GP30s, including 700, were sold to Wisconsin Central. When Wisconsin Central was acquired by the Canadian National Railway in 2001, 700 was donated the Lake Superior Railroad Museum. In 2005, it was restored and repainted and began service on the North Shore Scenic Railroad.

== Historical significance ==
As an early example of "second generation" diesel locomotives, it was the lead locomotive of the second order for new locomotives placed by the railroad after the 3-way merger of 1961; the third new locomotive, and the forth to carry the red and gray scheme. Neither of the ALCO RS-27s that preceded it have been preserved.

== Present-day operations ==
Soo Line 700 is one of four Soo Line locomotives in the Lake Superior Railroad Museum's collection, the others being Soo 320 (SW1, the first diesel purchased by the Soo Line), Soo Line 2500 and Soo Line 2719.

700 occasionally sees freight service, sometimes pulling empty coal hoppers stored during the winter. Often, it pulls short excursions but occasionally travels the full distance of the North Shore Scenic Railroad. Once in a while from 2007–2013, it was a helper locomotive for Soo Line 2719 on steam excursions.

Traction motor issues have led to reduced use of 700 in the last few years, and it is occasionally displayed inside the Lake Superior Railroad Museum.
