= List of preserved Northern Pacific Railway rolling stock =

A large quantity of rolling stock formerly owned and operated by Northern Pacific Railway have been preserved in museums, on tourist railroads, and various other locations all across North America.

== Preserved steam locomotives ==
Photograph	Number	Build date	Builder	Class	Wheel arrangement (Whyte notation)	Disposition	Location	Notes	References
	1 "Minnetonka""	1870	Porter	-	0-4-0ST+T	Static display	Lake Superior Railroad Museum in Duluth, Minnesota		
	21	1872	Baldwin Locomotive Works (BLW)	-	4-4-0	Static display	Winnipeg Railway Museum in Manitoba, Canada		
	328	August 1905	ALCO-Rogers	S-10	4-6-0	Static display	Jackson Street Roundhouse in St. Paul, Minnesota		
	924	September 1899	Rogers	L-5	0-6-0	Operational	Northwest Railway Museum in Snoqualmie, Washington	Originally built as St. Paul and Duluth 74. Became NP 924 when the Northern Pacific bought the St. Paul and Duluth in 1901.	
	1364	1902	Baldwin Locomotive Works (BLW)	S-4	4-6-0	Operational	Northern Pacific Railway Museum in Toppenish, Washington		
	1762	September 1917	ALCO-Brooks	W-3 (Redesignated as O-3 by the SPS)	2-8-2	Static display	Port of Kalama Interpretive Center in Kalama, Washington	Sold off to the Spokane, Portland and Seattle and became their no. 539.	
	2153	1909	Baldwin Locomotive Works (BLW)	Q-3	4-6-2	Undergoing cosmetic restoration	Jackson Street Roundhouse in St. Paul, Minnesota		
	2156	1909	Baldwin Locomotive Works (BLW)	Q-3	4-6-2	Undergoing cosmetic restoration	Jackson Street Roundhouse in St. Paul, Minnesota		
	2435	1907	ALCO-Brooks	T-1	2-6-2	Static display	Lake Superior Railroad Museum in Duluth, Minnesota		

== Preserved diesel locomotives ==
Photograph	Number	Build date	Builder	Model	Wheel arrangement	Disposition	Location	Notes	References
	105	1957	Electro-Motive Division (EMD)	EMD SW1200	B-B	Operational	Jackson Street Roundhouse in St. Paul, Minnesota		
	245	February 1956	Electro-Motive Division (EMD)	EMD GP9	B-B	Operational	Lake Superior Railroad Museum in Duluth, Minnesota		
	3617	May 1967	Electro-Motive Division (EMD)	EMD SD45	C-C	Operational	Lake Superior Railroad Museum		
	7003-D	September 1954	Electro-Motive Division (EMD)	EMD F9	B-B	Operational	Oklahoma Railway Museum in Oklahoma City, Oklahoma		
	7012-A	March 1956	Electro-Motive Division (EMD)	EMD F9	B-B	Operational	Mt. Rainier Railroad and Logging Museum in Mineral, Washington		

== Preserved passenger cars ==
Photograph	Number	Build date	Builder	Type	Disposition and Location	Notes	References
	313	1954	Budd Company	Dome / Sleeper	Operational, owned by Webb Rail		
	328	1959	Budd Company	Slumbercoach	Awaiting restoration, owned by Webb Rail	Named "Loch Ness"	
	549	1957	Budd Company	Dome / Coach	Operational, owned by Webb Rail		
