= Great Northern 400 =

Preserved EMD SD45 locomotive

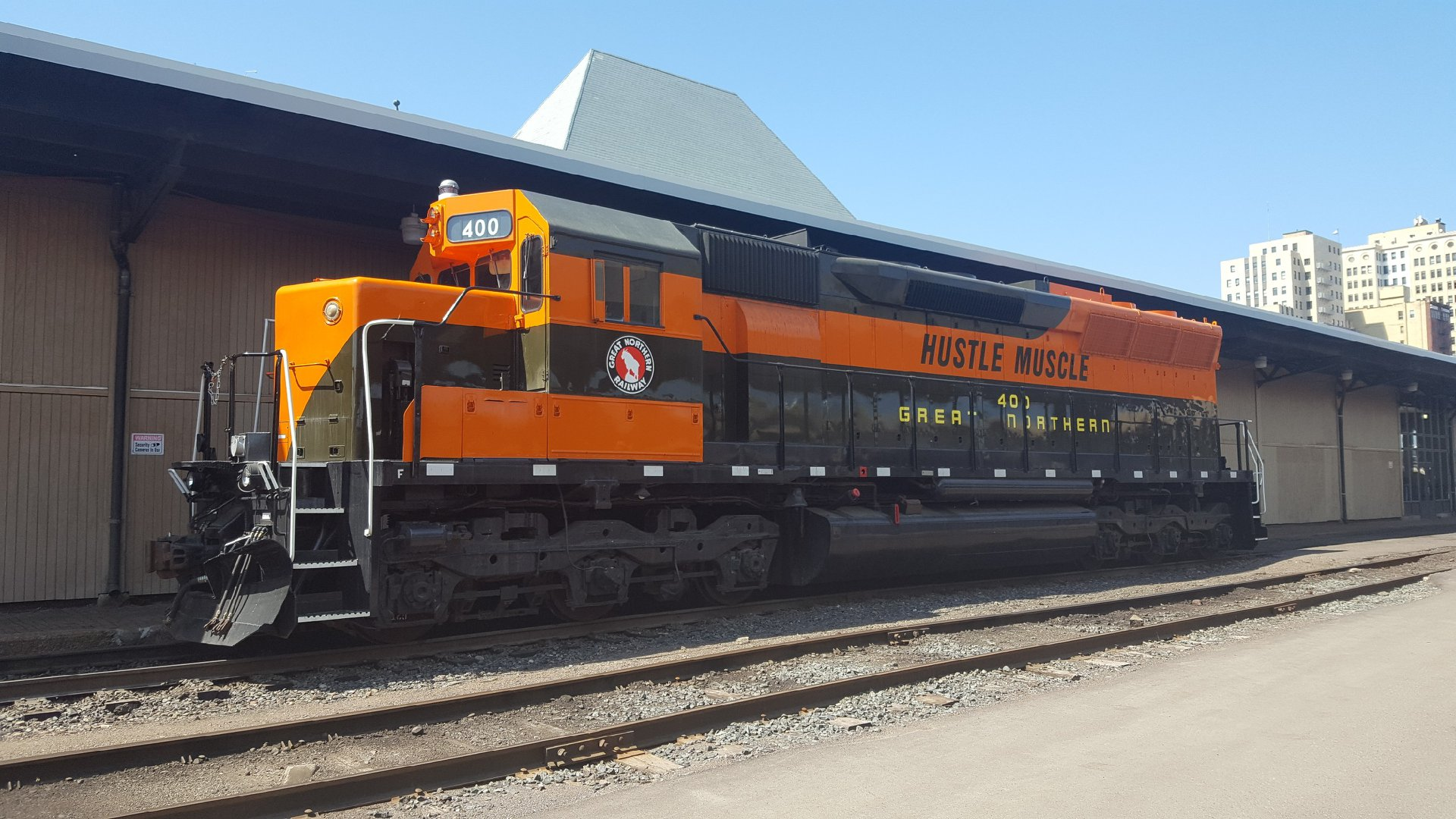
- GN 400 after arriving in Duluth, June 7, 2019.
Type and origin
- Power type: Diesel
- Builder: Electro-Motive Division
- Serial number: 31598
- Model: SD45
- Build date: 1966
Specifications
- Configuration
  - AAR: C-C
  - UIC: Co' Co'
  - Commonwealth: Co-Co
- Gauge: 4 ft 8 1/2 in (1,435 mm) standard gauge
- Trucks: Flexicoil C-C 6 wheel
- Length: 65 feet (20 m)
- Fuel capacity: 4,000 US gallons (15,000 L; 3,300 imp gal)
- Prime mover: EMD 20-645E3
- Engine type: V20 Diesel
- Aspiration: Turbocharged
- Cylinders: 20
Performance figures
- Power output: 3,600 horsepower (2,700 kW)
Career
- Operators: Great Northern Railway; Burlington Northern; Great Northern Railway Historical Society; Lake Superior Railroad Museum (leased)
- Numbers: GN 400; BN 6430
- Nicknames: Hustle Muscle
- Locale: Duluth, Minnesota, United States
- Delivered: May 1966
- Retired: 1986
- Restored: 1989, 2007, 2019
- Current owner: Great Northern Railway Historical Society
- Disposition: Operational

Great Northern 400, nicknamed Hustle Muscle, is a restored SD45 diesel locomotive originally owned by the Great Northern (GN). It was built in 1966 as the first production SD45 by Electro-Motive Division.

== History ==
GN 400 was the first of eight SD45s (400-407) delivered to the Great Northern in May and June 1966. Great Northern was the first railroad company to purchase this model of locomotive. GN 400 was the fourth SD45 built by EMD after the first three demonstrators. Great Northern christened it with its nickname, "Hustle Muscle." All eight SD45s wore Great Northern's simplified orange and green paint scheme, but only 400 wore a nickname. In total, Great Northern owned 27 SD45s built from 1966 through 1968.

In 1970, the GN became part of the Burlington Northern (BN). The locomotive was renumbered to 6430, but through 1972 it still wore its GN paint, with the GN logos removed. In 1973, the locomotive underwent a massive "class-one overhaul", and was painted into BN's cascade green scheme. At the request of railfans, BN kept its nickname painted on both sides of its long hood.

The BN retired 6430 in 1986 and donated the locomotive to the Great Northern Railway Historical Society. In 1989, the locomotive was repainted back into its original GN appearance and renumbered back to 400 in Grand Forks, North Dakota. The locomotive was then kept in Duluth, Minnesota on display and in operation until the early 2000s when it was moved to the former Great Northern Jackson Street Roundhouse in Saint Paul, Minnesota, which houses the Minnesota Transportation Museum. In 2006, the 400 was repainted a second time in Horicon, Wisconsin. The second repaint was completed using the locomotive's original EMD and GN diagrams. The locomotive was housed at the Minnesota Transportation Museum's Jackson Street Roundhouse, where the 400 was serviced while operating for the Great Northern Railway in the 1960s.

== Present-day operations ==
Prior to moving to Duluth for the first time, it was displayed in LaGrange, IL in September 1989 for EMD's 50th Anniversary of the FT diesel, along with other EMD power. The locomotive then operated on the North Shore Scenic Railroad, usually for special events. After moving from Duluth to St. Paul, the locomotive was called into duty for special excursions, including operating with Milwaukee Road 261 and pulling Great Northern Railway Historical Society and National Railway Historical Society charters. In 2001, it operated on a circle tour with the 261 from the Twin Cities to Superior, then west through Brainerd then south through Staples, and east back to the Twin Cities through St. Cloud.

It was featured in the 2002 "Railroad Days" in Galesburg, IL. It pulled a National Railway Historical Society excursion from the Twin Cities to Duluth in 2009 and running some excursions and photo trips on the North Shore Scenic Railroad. Otherwise, 400 was often displayed inside MTM's roundhouse. It was ferried in 2006 to the Wisconsin Southern for a repaint and returned to the Minnesota Transportation Museum in 2007.

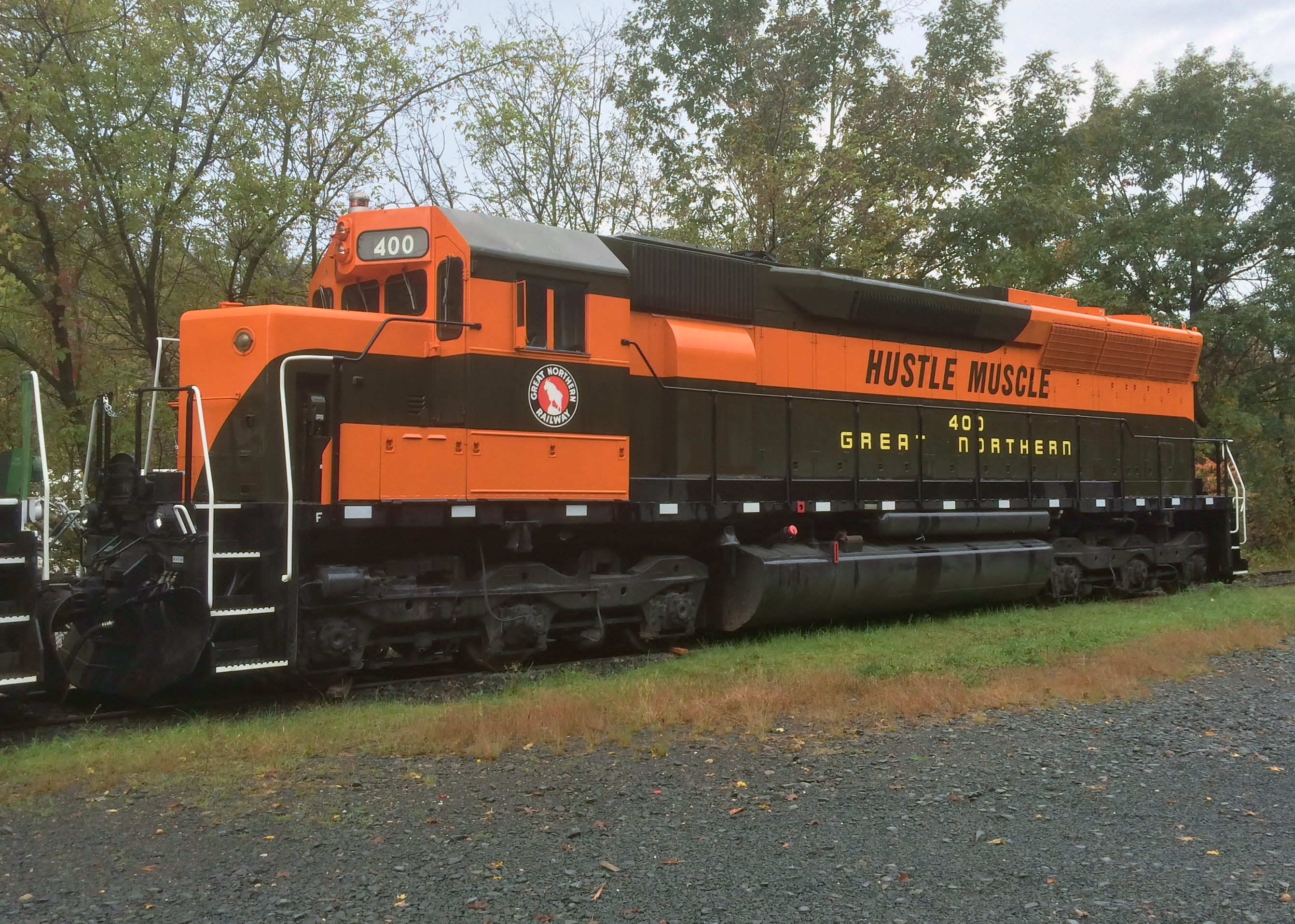
GN 400 Hustle Muscle on the Minnesota Transportation Museum's Osceola and St. Croix Valley Railway in 2016.

In 2015 the Minnesota Transportation Museum and the Great Northern Railway Historical Society signed a two-year operating lease to have the 400 operate on MTM's Osceola and St. Croix Valley Railway in Osceola, WI.

GN 400 operated during the 2015 and 2016 excursion seasons, including a special for the 2015 Great Northern Convention. It was often set aside just for special runs.

In 2019, following its third restoration, the GNRHS and Lake Superior Railroad Museum agreed to have the locomotive returned to Duluth, MN for display and operation. It was displayed in Dilworth, MN during the 2019 Great Northern Convention in Fargo, ND, before returning to Duluth for operation. The locomotive is currently displayed at the Lake Superior Railroad Museum, operating usually just for special events.

In 2014, 2015, and 2022 the locomotive was displayed for "Train Days" events at Saint Paul Union Depot.

=== Engine failure and replacement ===
In May 2017, while undergoing routine maintenance in preparation for the 2017 Osceola excursion season, the 400 suffered a crankshaft failure in its original 20-645E engine requiring a replacement engine to be installed. BNSF Railway overhauled a 20-645E engine from a retired former Santa Fe SD45-2 and donated and installed the new engine in January 2019 at no cost to the museum or historical society. The 400's engine replacement was completed in April 2019 and the locomotive operated under its own power for the first time with its new engine.
