= Copper Country Limited =

Passenger train

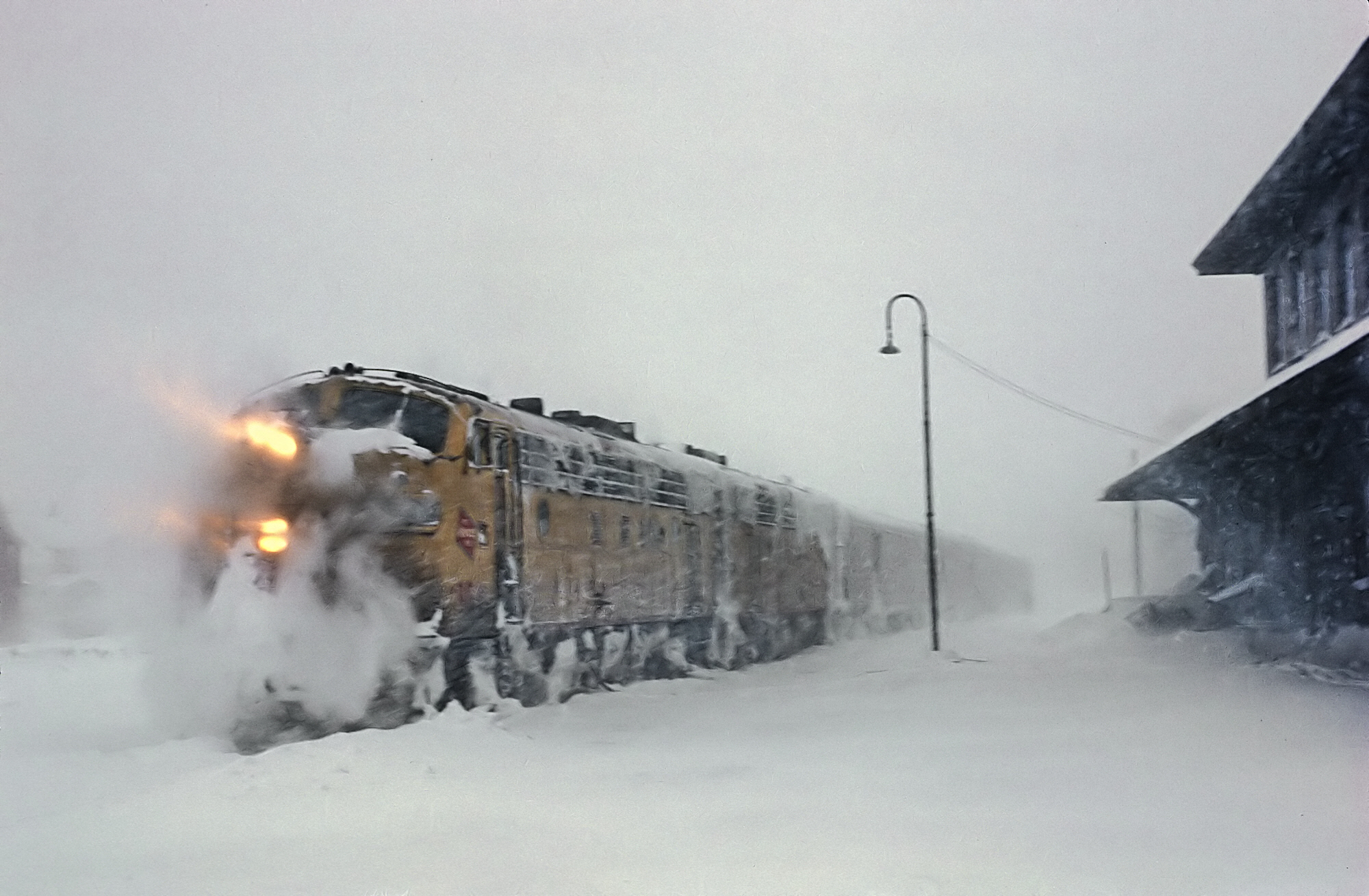
- The Copper Country Limited in Calumet, Michigan, during a snowstorm in 1967

Overview
- First service: March 1907
- Last service: March 7, 1968
- Former operators: Chicago, Milwaukee, St. Paul and Pacific Railroad and Duluth, South Shore and Atlantic Railway

Route
- Termini: Chicago, Illinois; Calumet, Michigan
- Stops: 36
- Distance travelled: 424 miles (682 km)
- Service frequency: Daily

Technical
- Timetable number: 9/10

The Copper Country Limited was a passenger train operated by the Chicago, Milwaukee, St. Paul and Pacific Railroad (the "Milwaukee Road") and the Duluth, South Shore and Atlantic Railway (DSS&A) between Chicago, Illinois and Calumet, Michigan, in Michigan's Upper Peninsula. It operated from 1907 to 1968.

== History ==
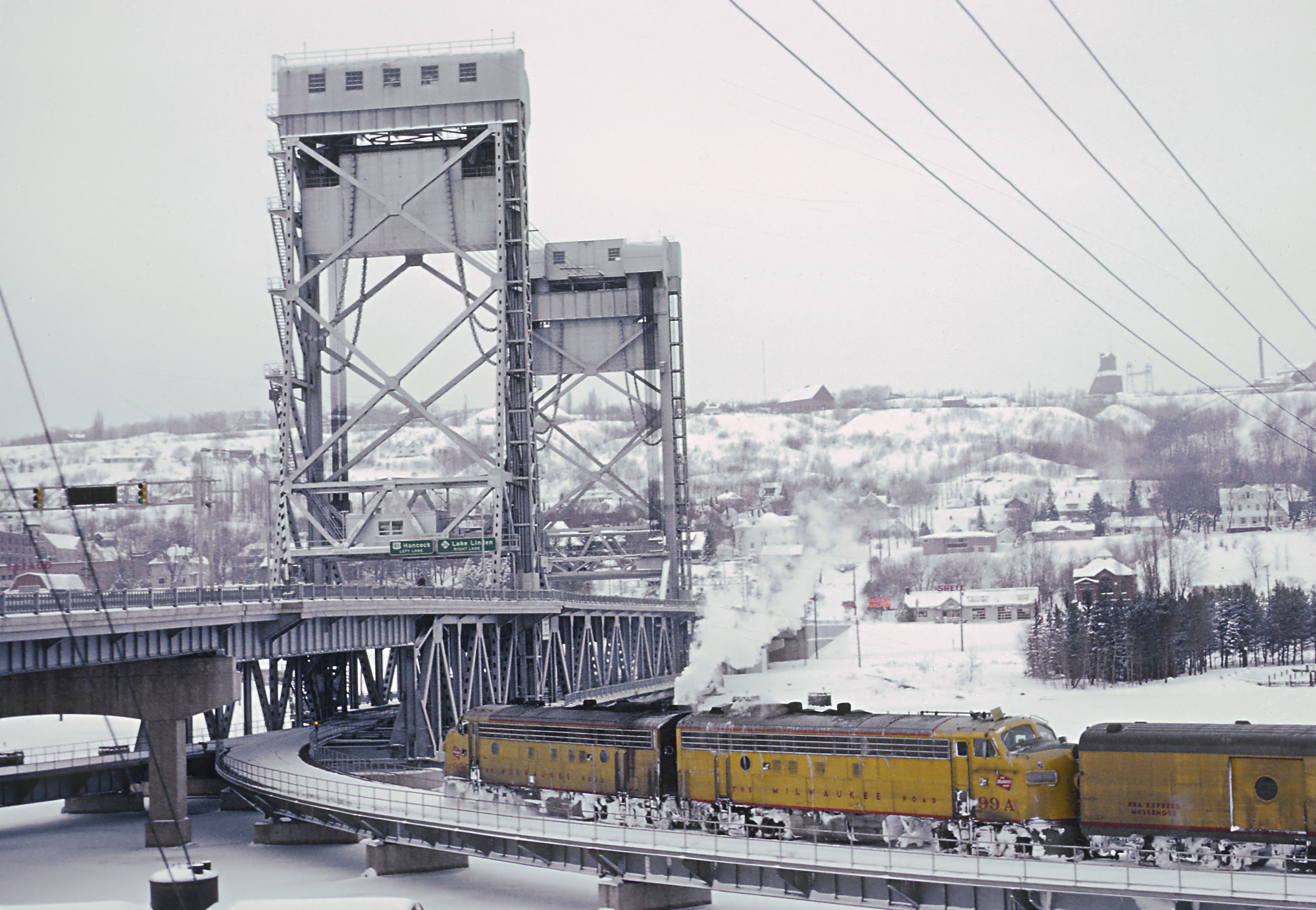
The Copper Country Limited crossing the Portage Lake Lift Bridge in 1967

According to historian Jim Scribbins the name "Copper Country Limited" was first used in March 1907 to describe an existing Chicago–Champion, Michigan–Calumet service which had run since 1899. The DSS&A handled the train north of Champion. The train operated overnight in both directions.

With the arrival of the Chippewa-Hiawatha on the Milwaukee Division during May 1938, the Copper Country Limited took a back seat on the Milwaukee Road's trains to Upper Michigan. During 1958, the through Sault Ste. Marie sleeper was discontinued entirely after several cutbacks leaving only the sleeper to Calumet. As ridership continued to slide the Milwaukee offered the sleeper only three days a week beginning in the spring of 1964. During its final years, the Copper Country carried only a few cars. Its existence persisted almost entirely because of the lucrative U.S. mail contracts that kept many similar trains running across the country. The Copper Country Limited lost its mail car in October 1967. With little reason to keep it and few riders remaining, the train made its last runs on March 7, 1968.

== Timetable ==
The summer of 1967 timetable shows the northbound Copper Country Limited leaving Chicago at 7:25 p.m., arriving at Milwaukee at 8:50 p.m., leaving Milwaukee at 9:20 p.m, stopping at Green Bay from 12:20 a.m. to 12:55 a.m. and arriving at Champion, Michigan at 6:45 a.m. On Soo Line Railroad tracks, the Copper Country Limited left Champion at 7:20 a.m. and arrived in Calumet, Mich. at 10:05 a.m. The train made 31 stops in the 424 miles between Chicago and Calumet. The southbound Copper Country Limited left Calumet at 5 p.m., stopped at Champion from 7:40 to 7:50 p.m., Green Bay from 1:15 to 1:45 a.m., Milwaukee from 5:15 to 6:05 a.m. and arrived at Chicago at 7:45 a.m. The route had 31 stops between Calumet and Chicago.

== Equipment ==
In steam days, the Copper Country Limited was hauled by non-streamlined Pacific 4-6-2 steam locomotives. In 1952, diesel locomotives took over and classes included EMD FP7, EMD E7A and EMD E9.
