= Northland (railcar) =

- U.S. National Register of Historic Places
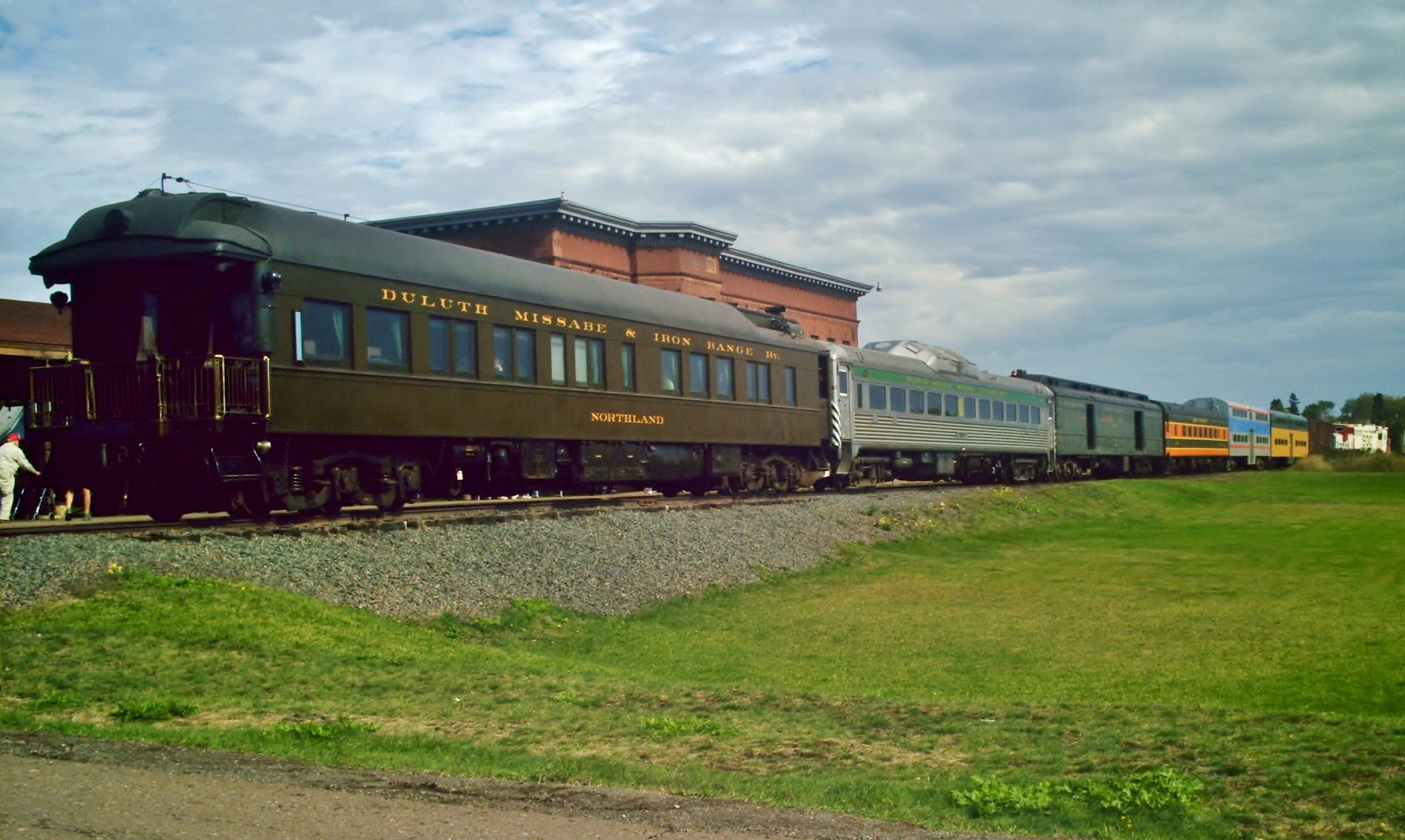
- Northland (left) connected to other railcars
- Location: Based at the Duluth Depot, Duluth, Minnesota
- Area: Less than one acre
- Built: 1916
- Built by: Pullman Company
- NRHP reference No.: 78003129
- Added to NRHP: July 31, 1978

Northland is a historic railroad passenger car built in 1916 for the Duluth, Missabe and Northern Railway to transport managers and important guests. The car was listed on the National Register of Historic Places in 1978 for its state-level significance in the theme of transportation. It was nominated for being one of the last operating examples of a private business railcar.

In 2003, Northland was acquired by the Lake Superior Railroad Museum and moved to the Duluth Depot in Duluth, Minnesota.

== See also ==
- National Register of Historic Places listings in St. Louis County, Minnesota
