= Soo Line Railroad =

American class I railroad

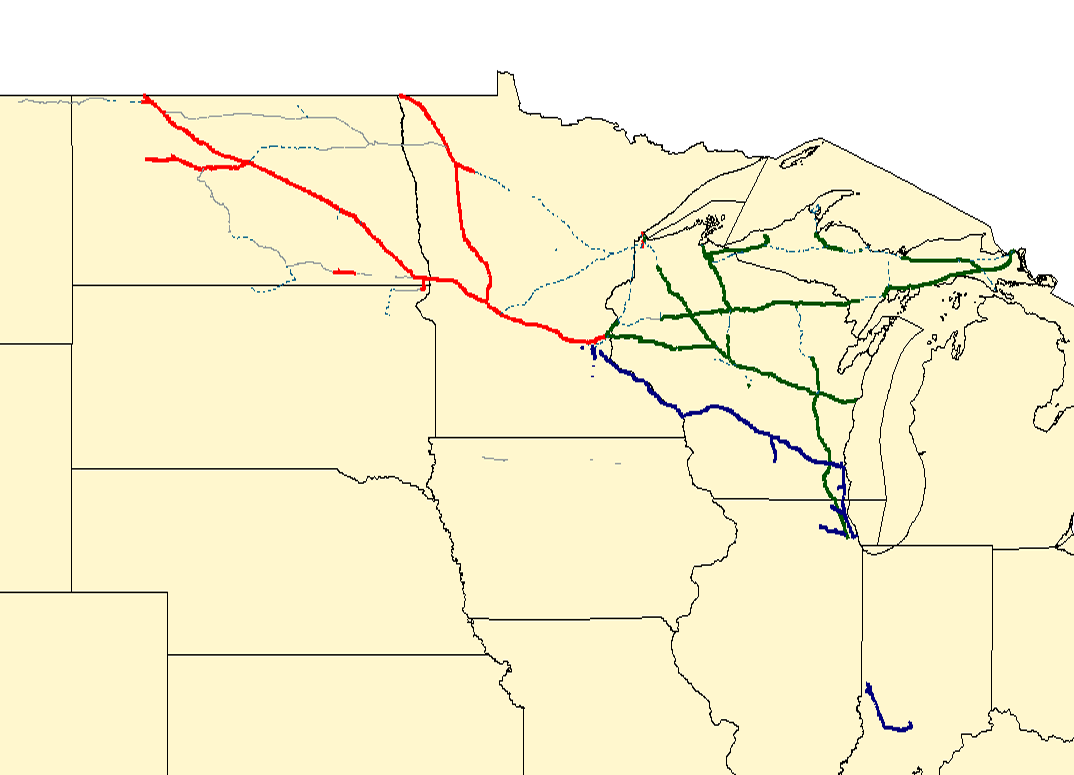
- Map of the Soo Line Railroad. Red lines are former SOO trackage operated by CPKC; dark blue lines are former MILW trackage also now operated by CPKC; green lines are former SOO trackage spun off to WC and now part of CN. Grey lines in North Dakota are operated by Short Lines (DMVW and NPR) and dotted light blue lines are abandoned.

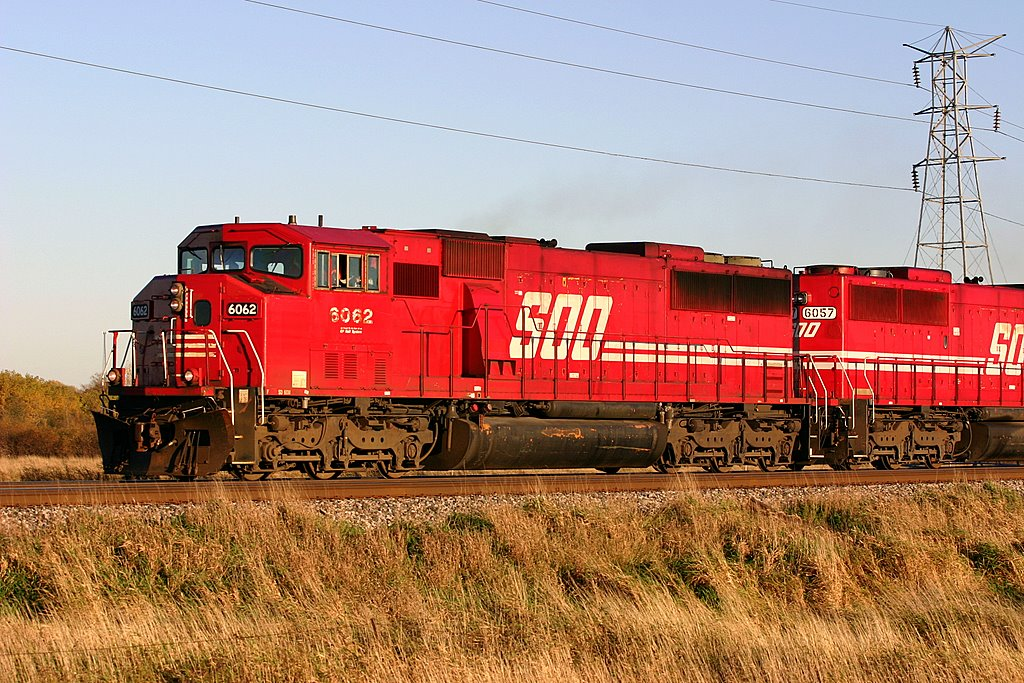
- SOO 6062, an EMD SD60M, leads a train through Wisconsin.

Overview
- Parent company: Canadian Pacific Railway (full ownership from 1990)
- Headquarters: Minneapolis, Minnesota
- Reporting mark: SOO
- Locale: North Dakota, Wisconsin, Minnesota, Michigan, Illinois
- Dates of operation: 1961; 65 years ago– 1990; 36 years ago (as an independent railroad; to present for CP ownership)
- Predecessor: Several Canadian Pacific Railway subsidiaries (1961): Duluth, South Shore and Atlantic Railway; Mineral Range Railroad; Minneapolis, St. Paul and Sault Ste. Marie Railroad; Wisconsin Central Railway (1897–1954); Minneapolis, Northfield and Southern Railway (1982/85); Milwaukee Road (1985)
- Successor: Canadian Pacific Railway (1990) Wisconsin Central Ltd. (former Lake States Transportation Division, 1987)

Technical
- Track gauge: 4 ft 8 1/2 in (1,435 mm) standard gauge

The Soo Line Railroad (reporting mark SOO) is one of the primary United States railroad subsidiaries for the CPKC Railway (reporting mark CPKC), one of six U.S. Class I railroads, controlled through the Soo Line Corporation. Although it is named for the Minneapolis, St. Paul and Sault Ste. Marie Railroad (MStP&SSM), which was commonly known as the Soo Line after the phonetic spelling of Sault, it was formed in 1961 by the consolidation of that company with two other subsidiaries of CPKC predecessor Canadian Pacific: The Duluth, South Shore and Atlantic Railway, and the Wisconsin Central Railway. It is also the successor to other Class I railroads, including the Minneapolis, Northfield and Southern Railway (acquired 1982) and the Chicago, Milwaukee, St. Paul and Pacific Railroad (Milwaukee Road, acquired at bankruptcy in 1985). On the other hand, a large amount of mileage was spun off in 1987 to Wisconsin Central Ltd., now part of the Canadian National Railway. The Soo Line Railroad and the Delaware and Hudson Railway, CPKC's other major subsidiary (before the 2008 DM&E acquisition), presently do business as the Canadian Pacific Railway (CP). Most equipment has been repainted into the CP scheme, but the U.S. Surface Transportation Board groups all of the company's U.S. subsidiaries under the Soo Line name for reporting purposes. The Minneapolis headquarters are in the Canadian Pacific Plaza building, having moved from the nearby Soo Line Building.

== System description ==
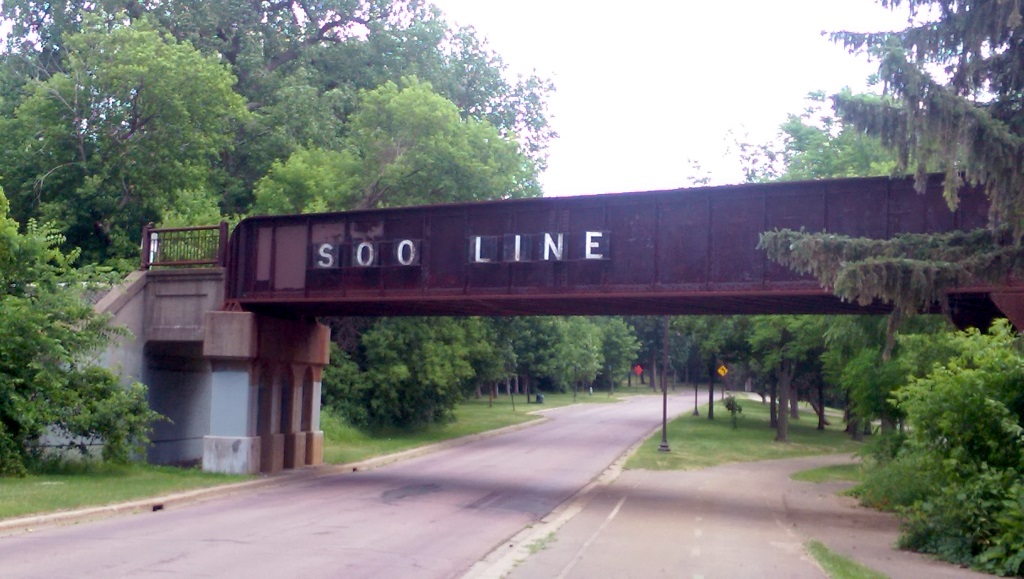
The eastern approach over Saint Anthony Parkway of the Canadian Pacific Camden Place Rail Bridge in Minneapolis

The company's main line begins at Portal, North Dakota, on the Canada–U.S. border, and extends southeast along former MStP&SSM trackage to the Twin Cities (Minneapolis–Saint Paul). Ex-Milwaukee Road trackage takes the Soo Line from the Twin Cities to Chicago via Milwaukee. Between Chicago and Detroit, where the CPKC-owned Detroit River Tunnel connects back into Canada, the Soo Line has trackage rights over the Norfolk Southern Railway and haulage rights over CSX Transportation.

Major branches include a connection from the border at Noyes, Minnesota, to Glenwood and, until it was sold to the Indiana Rail Road in 1983, a line from Chicago to Louisville, Kentucky.

Through trackage rights over the BNSF Railway, the Soo Line also serves Duluth from the Twin Cities.

At the end of 1970, the Soo Line operated 4,693 miles (7,553 km) of road on 6,104 miles (9,823 km) of track; that year it reported 8,249 million ton-miles of revenue freight and no passengers.

== History ==
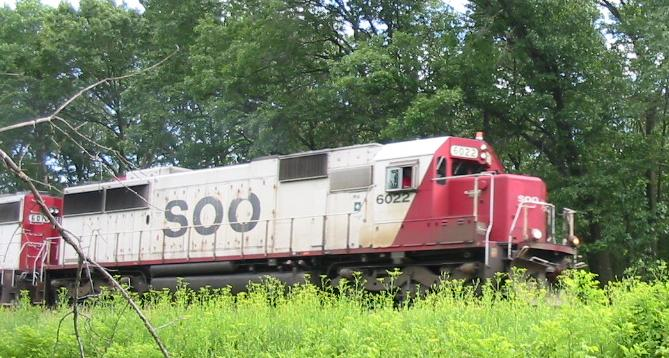
Soo Line 6022, an EMD SD60, pulls a train through Wisconsin Dells on June 20, 2004.

The present Soo Line Railroad was incorporated in Minnesota on October 19, 1949, as the Duluth, South Shore and Atlantic Railroad, as part of the plan for reorganizing the Duluth, South Shore and Atlantic Railway (DSA) and subsidiary Mineral Range Railroad. When CP consolidated several subsidiaries on January 1, 1961, it used this company to merge the Minneapolis, St. Paul and Sault Ste. Marie Railroad and the Wisconsin Central Railway into, and renamed it to the present name, the Soo Line Railroad. The Soo Line gained control of the Minneapolis, Northfield and Southern Railway (MNS), a Twin Cities–area shortline railroad, in June 1982.

Passenger service was mostly eliminated by the 1961 merger, but several trains remained for a few more years. These were a Saint Paul to Duluth daytime train known only as Trains 62 and 63 (discontinued June 1961), the overnight Chicago to Duluth Laker and its Saint Paul connection (both discontinued January 15, 1965), the Twin Cities to Winnipeg Winnipeger (discontinued March 25, 1967), and the Saint Paul to Portal Soo-Dominion that, during the summer, ran through to Vancouver via a connection with Canadian Pacific's The Dominion at Moose Jaw. It was discontinued in December 1963, and the western Canada cars were handled on the Winnipeger for two more summers before they too were pulled. The Soo Line's last passenger train was the Copper Country Limited, a joint service with the Milwaukee Road inherited from the Duluth, South Shore and Atlantic. This Chicago-Champion-Calumet service was discontinued May 8, 1968. In addition, there were several mixed trains, with additional ones created to enable the discontinuance of the Saint Paul to Portal passenger train. Some mixed train services gained notoriety because passengers were conveyed in one direction only.

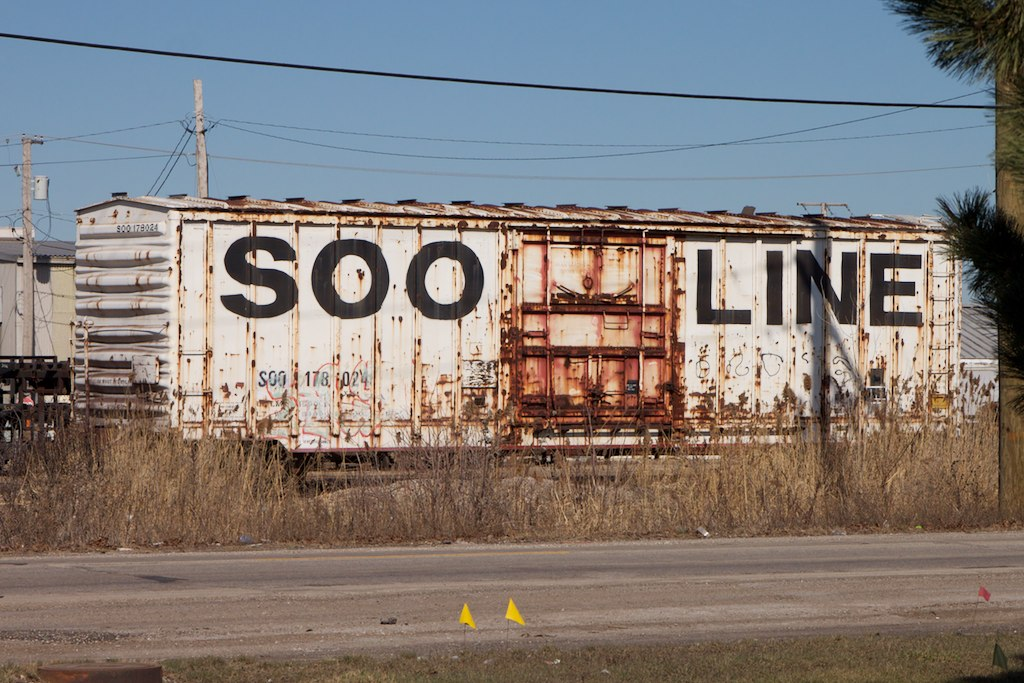
A Soo Line boxcar in 2010

In 1984, CP incorporated the Soo Line Corporation in Minnesota as a holding company, exchanging stock in December to give the Soo Line Corporation total control over the railroad. Two months later, on February 19, 1985, the Soo Line purchased the property of the bankrupt Chicago, Milwaukee, St. Paul and Pacific Railroad and assigned it to a newly created subsidiary, The Milwaukee Road, Inc. This company and the MN&S were both merged into the Soo Line Railroad effective January 1, 1986. To cut costs, the Soo Line created the Lake States Transportation Division (LSTD) on February 10, 1986 to operate the less-important lines, including the ex-Wisconsin Central line between Chicago and the Twin Cities. Unable to implement its proposed labor rule changes, the Soo Line sold the approximately 2,000-mile (3,200 km) LSTD to a new regional railroad, Wisconsin Central Ltd., in 1987 for $133 million. That same year, Metra (Chicago's commuter rail services provider), acquired the bankrupt Milwaukee Road trackage between Chicago and Elgin and Chicago and Fox Lake, relegating the Soo Line to a tenant status as a trackage rights freight train operator. (The WC folded into the Canadian National Railway in 2001). In 1990, CP gained full control of the Soo Line Corporation, of which it had previously owned about 56% of the common stock. In the 2000s, the Soo Line was consolidated into CP.

== Named passenger trains ==
The railroad ran several long distance named trains.

- Laker, Minneapolis, Minnesota – Twin Ports, Minnesota/Wisconsin – Chicago, Illinois
- Soo-Dominion, Mountaineer, Chicago, Illinois – Saint Paul, Minnesota – Vancouver, British Columbia
- Winnipeger, Saint Paul, Minnesota – Winnipeg, Manitoba

== Presidents ==
The Presidents of the Soo Line Railroad were:

- Leonard H. Murray, 1961–1978, previously President of the Duluth, South Shore and Atlantic Railway
- Thomas M. Beckley, 1978–1983
- Dennis Miles Cavanaugh, 1983–1986, 1987–1989
- Robert C. Gilmore, 1986–1987
- Edwin V. Dodge, 1989–1996

== Remaining locomotives ==
=== Preserved ===
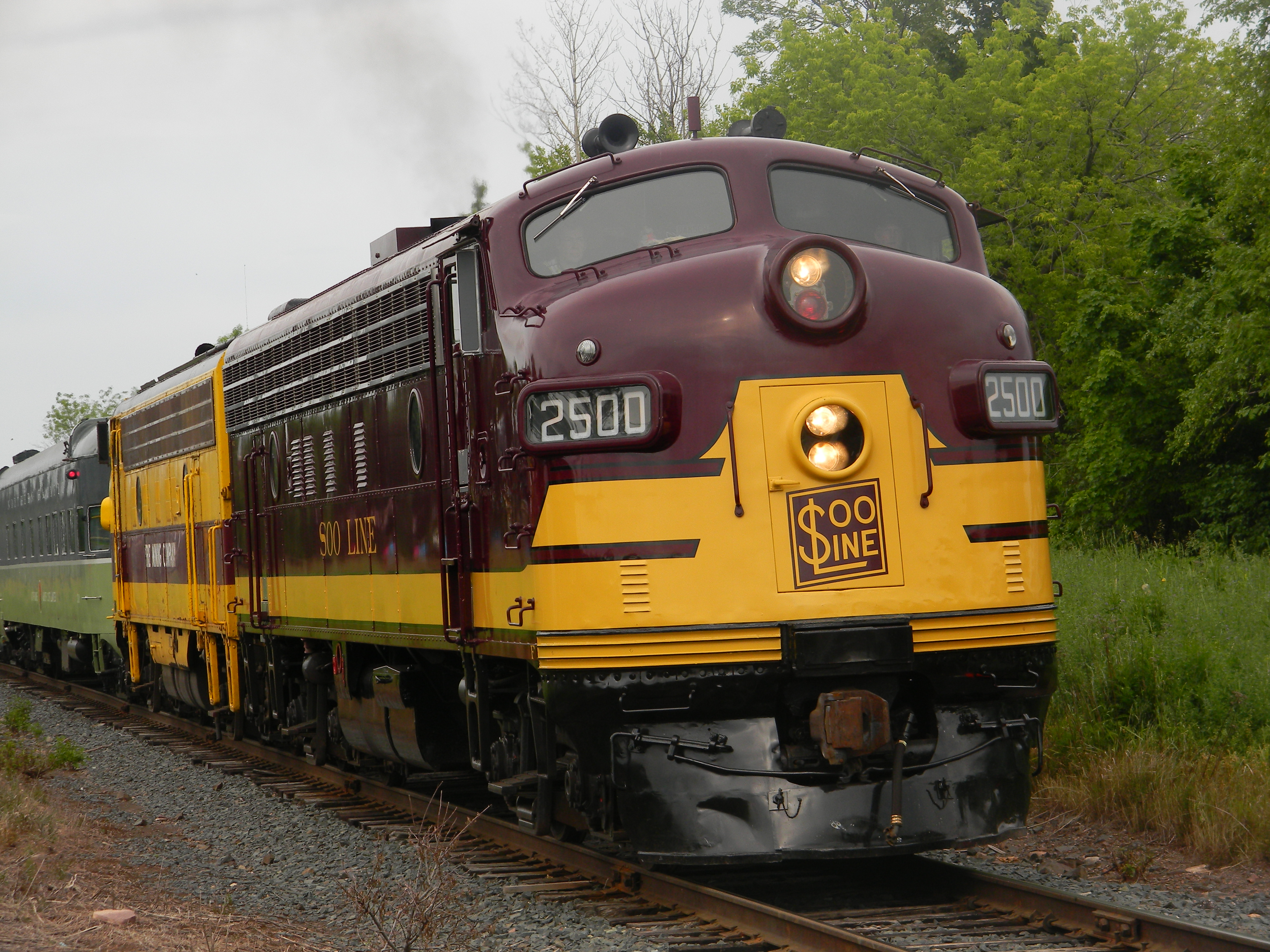
Soo Line 2500 pulls a special train in Duluth on July 12, 2014.

Some of the railroad's diesel locomotives have been preserved:

- 500, an EMD FP7A, on display in Ladysmith, Wisconsin.
- 700, an EMD GP30, at the Lake Superior Railroad Museum in Duluth, Minnesota. Restored for use on their North Shore Scenic Railroad.
- 703, an EMD GP30, and 991, a Barney and Smith heavyweight passenger car, at the Colfax Railroad Museum in Colfax, Wisconsin.
- 715, an EMD GP30, at the National Railroad Museum in Ashwaubenon, Wisconsin, although it wears a Wisconsin Central Ltd. paint scheme.
- 2500, an EMD FP7A, at the Lake Superior Railroad Museum in Duluth. Also restored for use on their North Shore Scenic Railroad.

In addition, a number of the railroad's 145 steel cabooses have been preserved along with Soo Line 4402 which (as of 2025) has returned to active duty.

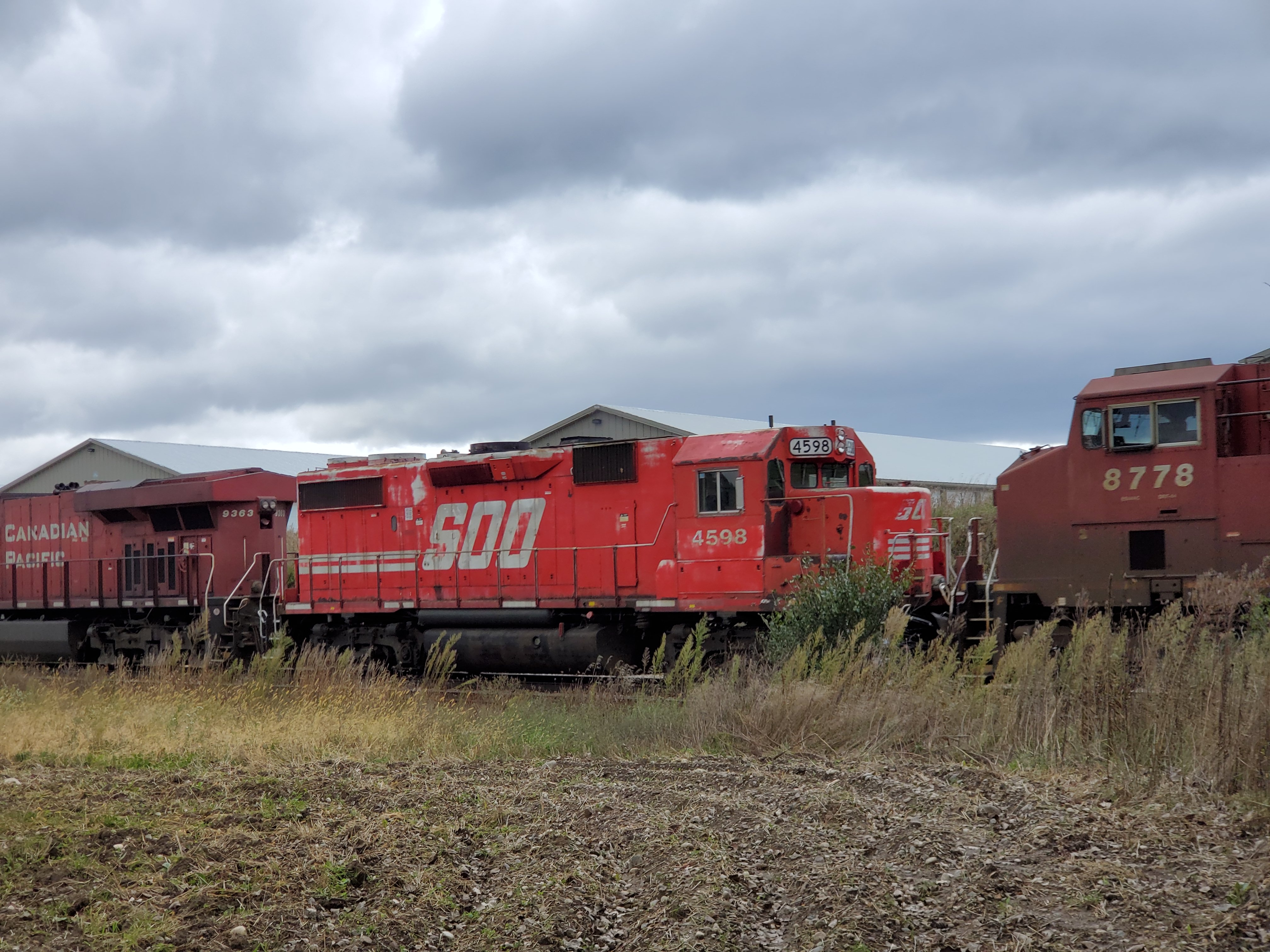
SOO 4598, an EMD GP39-2, trails on a train through Oconomowoc, Wisconsin, on October 13, 2019.

== Rail trails ==
- The Soo Line Trail in Minnesota was created from former pieces of the railroad which has extended down into the Lake Wobegon Trail. The trails are enjoyed by walkers, runners, and bikers in the area.
- The Copper Country Limited railroad lines in Michigan's Keweenaw Peninsula, along with former lines owned by the Copper Range Railroad, have been turned into ATV trails. Some, like the 17-mile-long (27 km) Jack Stevens Hancock-Calumet Trail, are multi-purpose and are used by hikers and bikers year-round.
- The Wolf River State Trail was created on a section of the Soo Line's Shawano Subdivision. Tracks were removed in 2001 by Wisconsin Central between Shawano and Crandon, and a segment from White Lake to Crandon later became the Wolf River State Trail. It is open to ATVs, snowmobiles, hikers and horseback riders.

== See also ==
- Soo Line locomotives
- Soo Line Depot (disambiguation)

== Bibliography ==
- Abbey, Wallace W (1984). The Little Jewel. Pueblo, CO: Pinon Productions. ISBN 0-930855-00-0. LCCN 84014873.
- Dorin, Patric C. (1979). The Soo Line. Burbank, CA: Superior Publishing Company. ISBN 0-87564-712-X. LCCN 79012204.
- Gjevre, John A. (1990) [1973]. Saga of the Soo, West from Shoreham (second ed.). Morehead, MN: Gjevre Books. OCLC 23244801.
- Glischinski, Steve (2013). "Official Guidebook" Lake Superior Railroad Museum and North Shore Scenic Railroad. Duluth, MN: Jeff Terry.
