= ALCO Century 424 =

Model of US/Canadian diesel locomotive

Century 424
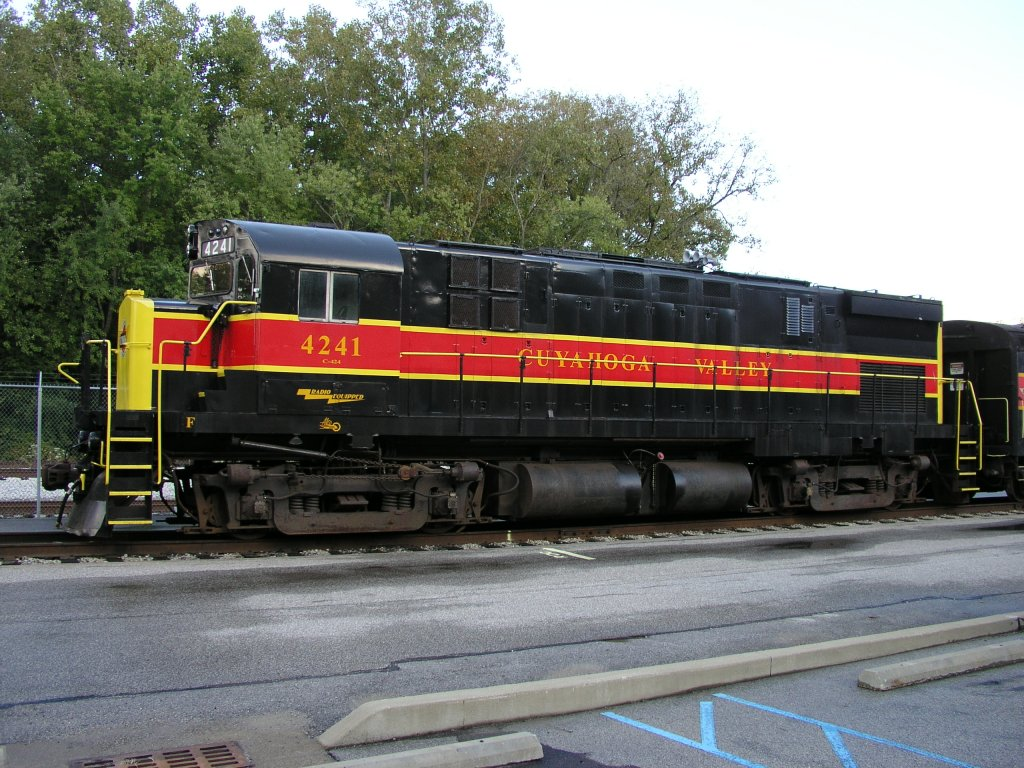
Type and origin
- Power type: Diesel-electric
- Builder: ALCO Products; Montreal Locomotive Works
- Model: Century 424
- Build date: April 1963 – May 1967
- Total produced: 190
Specifications
- Configuration
  - AAR: B-B
- Gauge: 4 ft 8 1/2 in (1,435 mm) standard gauge
- Prime mover: ALCO 251
Performance figures
- Power output: 2,400 hp (1,790 kW)
Career
- Locale: North America
- Disposition: Some still in active service on shortline railroads or excursion trains, 6 preserved, rest scrapped

The Century 424 is a four-axle, 2,400 hp (1,790 kW) diesel-electric locomotive. 183 were built between April 1963 and May 1967. Cataloged as a part of Alco's Century line of locomotives, the C424 was intended to replace the earlier RS-27 model and offered as a lower-priced alternative to the C425. Montreal Locomotive Works also built some of these locomotives.

== Original owners ==
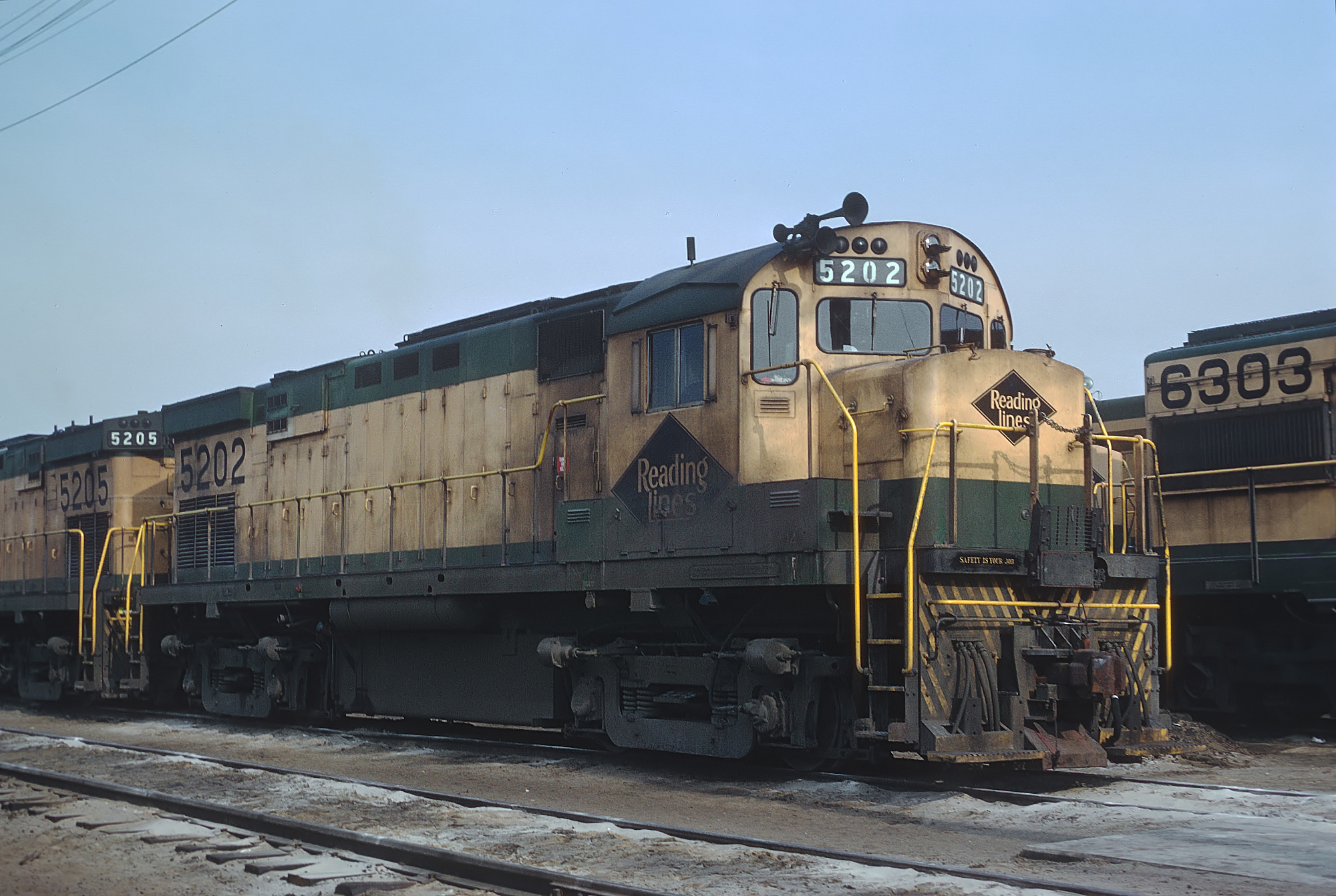
Reading Railroad ALCO C424 5202 at Rutherford Yard in Harrisburg, Pennsylvania in 1970

=== Locomotives built by ALCO ===
Image	Owner	Quantity	Numbers	Notes
	Belt Railway of Chicago	6	600–605	At least one (#603) now Western New York & Pennsylvania Railroad
	Erie Lackawanna Railway	15	2401–2415	
	Erie Mining Company	1	500	
	Ferrocarriles Nacionales de México	45	8100-8144	
	Green Bay and Western Railroad	4	311–314	
	Pennsylvania Railroad	1	2415	rebuilt from RS27 demonstrator 640-1
	Reading Company	10	5201–5210	
	Spokane, Portland and Seattle Railway	7	300–306	To Burlington Northern 4240–4246.
	Toledo, Peoria and Western Railway	2	800–801	Later sold to the Morristown & Erie Railway as #18 and 19. #19 preserved by Tri-State Railway Historical Society. #18 preserved by the Illinois Railway Museum in Union, IL.
	Wabash Railroad	7	B900-B906	Originally supposed to be NDM 8100–8106, but the order was canceled and the units were sold to Wabash. They were prohibited from being used as lead units due to the controls being labelled in Spanish.
	Total	98		

=== Locomotives built by MLW ===
Image	Owner	Quantity	Numbers	Notes
	Canadian National Railway	41	3200–3240	
	Canadian Pacific Railway	51	8300, 4201–4250	8300 renumbered 4200. 4241 to Cuyahoga Valley Scenic Railway
	Total	92		

== Preservation ==
- Toledo, Peoria and Western 801 is preserved as Morristown & Erie 19 by the Tri-State Railway Historical Society and in storage in Boonton, NJ
- Toledo, Peoria and Western 800 is preserved as Morristown & Erie 18 at the Illinois Railway Museum in Union, IL
- Canadian Pacific 4237 is preserved at the Canadian Railway Museum in Saint-Constant, QC.
- Reading 5204 is preserved by the Reading Company Technical & Historical Society
- Canadian Pacific 4230 is preserved as West Chester Railroad 4230 in West Chester, PA
- Canadian Pacific 4213 is preserved as West Chester Railroad 4213 in West Chester, PA
- Belt Railway of Chicago 605 is currently in Austin Steam Train Association yard in Cedar Park, Texas

== See also ==
- List of ALCO diesel locomotives
- List of MLW diesel locomotives
