= Leonard Murray (railroad executive) =

American railroad executive

Leonard H. Murray (1913 – November 20, 2001) was an American railroad executive. A graduate of the University of Minnesota Law School, Murray served as President of the Soo Line Railroad for 17 years. His careful management enabled the Soo to survive in difficult times. He also practiced law in Minnesota and served as President of the Duluth, South Shore, and Atlantic Railroad for a time.
