= Northern Pacific class T-1 =

Northern Pacific Railway class T-1
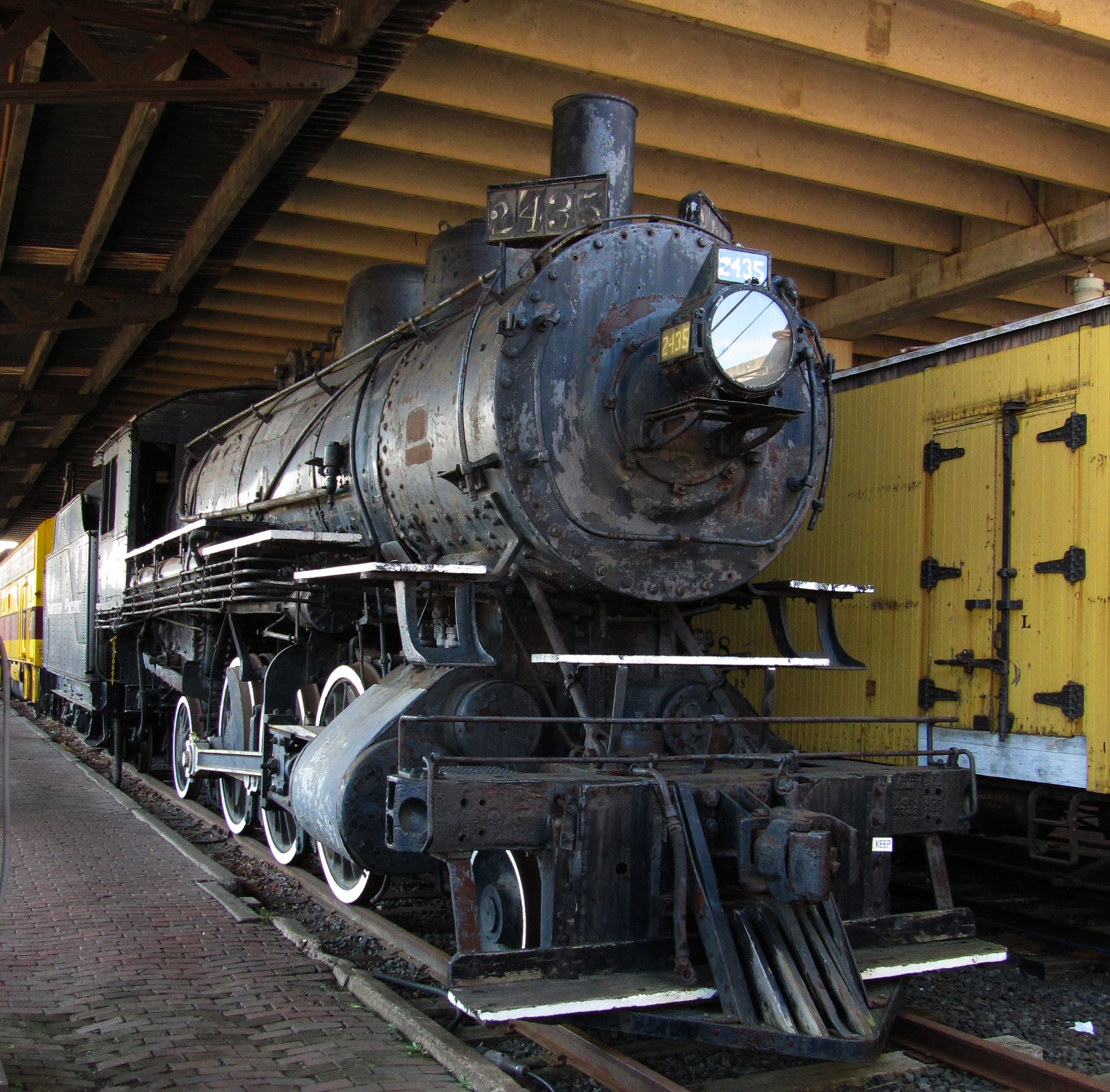
- NP #2435 at the Lake Superior Railroad Museum
Type and origin
- Power type: Steam
- Builder: American Locomotive Co.
- Build date: 1906–1907 (as class T)
- Total produced: 18
- Rebuild date: 1926–1929
Specifications
- Configuration
  - Whyte: 2-6-2
  - UIC: 1’C1’ h2
- Driver: 3rd coupled axle
- Gauge: 4 ft 8 1/2 in (1,435 mm)
- Wheelbase
  - Engine: 28.92'
- Adhesive weight: 15,600 lbs
- Loco weight: 208,500 lbs
- Tender weight: 148,500 lbs
- Total weight: 357,000 lbs
- Fuel type: Coal
- Heating surface
  - Firebox: 213 sq. ft.
Career
- Operators: Northern Pacific Railway
- Class: T-1
- Numbers: 2450–2467
- Locale: USA
- Disposition: 1 preserved, remainder scrapped

The Northern Pacific Railway class T-1 was a class of 2-6-2 steam locomotives rebuilt by the Northern Pacific Railway in the 1920s for switching and terminal service. They had originally been built between 1906 and 1907 by the American Locomotive Company's Brooks Works as the NP's class T for service on in the railway's expanding network of branch lines.

== Usage ==
The 2-6-2 Class T-1 Was used on the Northern Pacific Railway from roughly 1926–1959. #2435 survives today.
