= Lake Superior Railroad Museum =

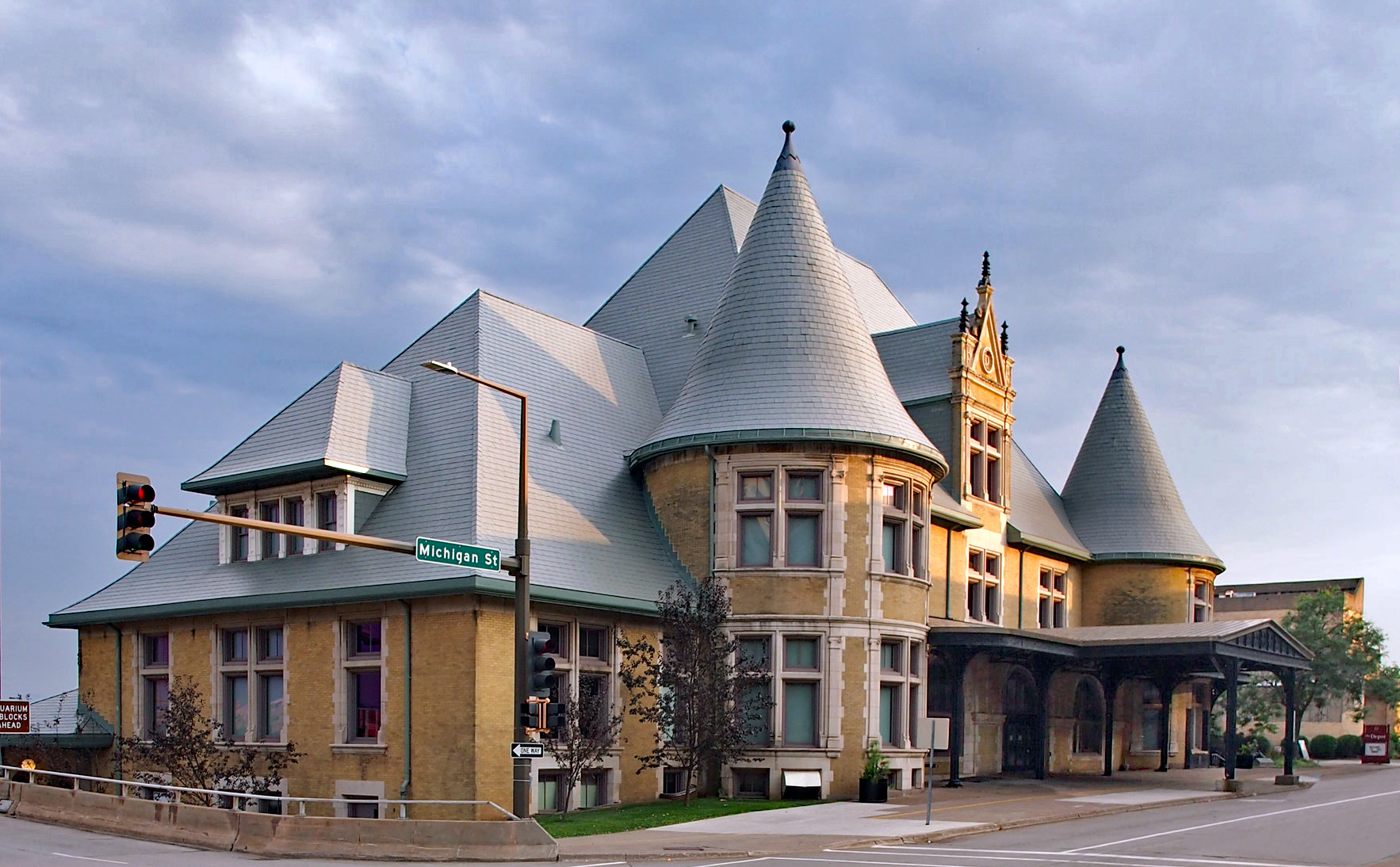
- The museum is housed at the Duluth Depot
- Established: 1973
- Location: 506 W. Michigan St., Duluth, Minnesota
- Coordinates: 46.7814°N 92.1039°W
- Type: Railroad museum
- Public transit access: DTA
- Website: http://www.lsrm.org/

The Lake Superior Railroad Museum (reporting mark LSRX) is a railroad museum in Duluth, Minnesota, United States.

Opened in 1973, the museum focuses on railroading in the Lake Superior region. It is housed in the restored St. Louis County Depot.

The museum also operates the North Shore Scenic Railroad, which runs excursion trains from Memorial Day through mid-October using historic rail equipment from the museum collection.

The collection includes the William Crooks, which became the first locomotive to operate in the state of Minnesota in 1861, and Duluth, Missabe and Iron Range Railway Number 227, a 2-8-8-4 "Yellowstone" locomotive that was among the largest steam engines to operate.

Several museum spaces are available for rent as an event venue.

== Equipment ==
=== Steam locomotives ===
Locomotive	Type	Built	Retired	Acquired	Status	Image
Duluth, Missabe & Iron Range #227	Class M-3, 2-8-8-4 "Yellowstone"	Baldwin, 1941	1960	Donated 1974	Static Display	
Duluth & Northeastern #28	Class C-3, 2-8-0 "Consolidation"	Alco, 1908	1965	Donated 1974	Operational	
Duluth & Northern Minnesota #14	2-8-2, "Mikado"	Baldwin, 1913	1966	Donated 1981	Static Display	
Minnesota Steel Co. #7	0-4-0ST	Porter, 1915	1950s	Donated 1973	Display	
Northern Pacific #1 "Minnetonka"	0-4-0ST+T	Porter, 1870	1948	Loaned 1975	Display	
Northern Pacific #2435	Class T, 2-6-2 "Prairie"	Alco, 1907	1954	Donated 1978	Display	
Soo Line #2719	Class H-23, 4-6-2 "Pacific"	Alco, 1923	1959	Purchased 2019	Display, awaiting overhaul	
St. Paul & Pacific #1 "Wm Crooks"	4-4-0 "American"	New Jersey Locomotive & Machine Co. 1861	1948	Loaned 1974	Display	

=== Electric locomotives ===
Locomotive	Type	Built	Retired	Acquired	Status	Image
Hanna Ore Mining Co. #307	GE 60-Ton Steeple-cab	1928	1968	Donated 1974	Display	
Milwaukee Road #10200	GE EF-1	1915	1974	Donated 1977	Display	
Carris #530	Carris/Brill 508-531	1925	Unknown	Purchased 1978	Operational	

=== Diesel locomotives ===
Locomotive	Type	Built	Retired	Acquired	Status	Image
Burlington Northern Santa Fe #1550 (GN 573)	EMD SD9-3	1954	2022	Donated 2022	Operational	
Copper Range #200	BLW S-12	1951	1995-96	Donated 2017	Under cosmetic restoration	
Defence Plant Corp. #1309	EMD 40-Ton	1941	2008	2008	Display	
Duluth Missabe & Iron Range #193	EMD SD-18	1960	1998	Donated 1998	Operational	
Duluth South Shore & Atlantic #101	Alco RS1	1945	2002	Donated 2017	Operational	
Erie Mining Co. #4211	EMD F9A	1956	2001	Donated 2002	Operational	
Erie Mining Co. #4222	EMD F9B	1956	2001	Donated 2006	Under restoration	
Erie Mining Co. #7243	BLW S-12	1956	1992	Donated 1992	Awaiting cosmetic restoration	
Fegles Construction Co. #171007	MTC 12-Ton	1931	1970	1973	Operational	
Great Northern #192	EMD NW5	1947	1996	Purchased 1996	Operational	
Great Northern #400	EMD SD45	1966	1984	Leased 2019-	Operational	
Minneapolis Northfield & Southern #11	FM H-10-44	1946	2005	Donated 2005	Under cosmetic restoration	
Minnesota Power & Light Co.	GE 45-Ton	1952	Unknown	2003	Operational	
Northern Pacific #245	EMD GP9	1956	2019	Traded 2019	Operational	
Northern Pacific #3617	EMD SD45	1967	1987/again 2007	Donated 2007	Operational	
Oliver Iron Mining #900	ALCO HH1000	1940	1973	Donated 1974	Awaiting cosmetic restoration	
Soo Line #320	EMD SW1	1939	2017	Donated 2017	Operational	
Soo Line #700	EMD GP30	1963	2001	Donated 2001	Operational	
Soo Line #2500	EMD FP7-A	1949	1986	Donated 1986	Operational	

=== Diesel railcars ===
Locomotive	Type	Built	Retired	Acquired	Status	Image
Alaska #712	Budd RDC-2	1951	2008	Loaned 2009	Operational	
Chicago & Northwestern #9934	Budd RDC-1	1950	Unknown	Loaned 1996	Operational, Painted as NSSR #9169	

=== Passenger cars ===
Railroad Company	Operating Number	Car Name	Car Type	Status	Image
Atchison, Topeka & Santa Fe	551	Sky View	Full Dome	Operational	
Atchison, Topeka & Santa Fe	76		Baggage/Dorm	Under Restoration	
Canadian National	9299		Baggage	Operational	
Canadian National	92	Scottish Thistle	Business	Under Private Restoration	
Chicago & North Western	51		Bi-Level Coach	Operational	
Chicago & North Western	222		Bi-Level Coach	Operational	
Chicago & North Western	321		Bi-Level Coach	Operational	
Chicago & North Western	6700	Deerpath	Parlor/Lounge	Operational (Stored at ELS)	
Chicago, Burlington, & Quincy	250	Silver Club	Vista Dome	Operational	
Duluth & Iron Range	19		Coach	Gallery Display	
Duluth, Missabe & Iron Range	W-24		Combine	Operational	
Duluth, Missabe & Iron Range	33		Coach	Operational	
Duluth, Missabe & Iron Range		Northland	Business	Operational	
Duluth, Missabe & Northern	68		Coach	Dining Display	
Duluth, Missabe & Northern		Missabe	Business	Display	
Grand Trunk Western	5327		Lounge	Operational	
Great Northern	257		Baggage	Used For Storage	
Great Northern	1115	Liz Prebich	Coach	Operational	
Great Northern	1116		Coach	Operational	
Great Northern (CB&Q)	1250	Lake of the Isles	Diner	Operational	
Great Northern	1323	Puget Sound	Sleeper/Dome	Operational	
Northern Pacific	255		Baggage	Gallery Car	
Northern Pacific	390	Rainier Club	Observation	Operational	
Northern Pacific	517	Minnesota II	Coach	Operational	
Northern Pacific	1447		Railroad Post Office	Display	
Spokane, Portland & Seattle	66		Baggage	Operational	
St. Paul & Pacific	1		Combine	Display	
St. Paul & Pacific	3		Coach	Display	

=== Cabooses ===
- Burlington Northern #12410
- Duluth, Missabe & Iron Range #C-9
- Duluth, Missabe & Iron Range #C-12
- Duluth, Missabe & Iron Range #C-205
- Duluth, Winnipeg and Pacific #76923
- Great Northern #X-452
- Northern Pacific #1311
- Soo Line #1
- Soo Line #99017

=== Service & miscellaneous equipment ===
- Burlington Northern Motor Powered Wrecker #D-161 - Built 1915
- Erie Mining Co. #8440 Pontiac Hy-rail Inspection Car - Built 1957
- Northern Pacific Rotary Snow Plow #2 - Built 1887 by the Cooke Locomotive and Machine Works, #2 is the world's oldest surviving rotary snow plow. The museum acquired it in 1975 and it was designated a Historic Mechanical Engineering Landmark in 2015.
- Northern Pacific Wedge Snowplow #19 - Built 1907
- Northern Pacific Steam Powered Wrecker #38 - Built 1913
- 1920 McGiffert log loader

=== Former equipment ===
- Burlington Northern, Dynamometer Car #B10: Sold to the Ironhorse Railroad Park
- Canadian National, Coach #5375: Sold to the Mid-Continent Railway Museum
- Duluth Missabe & Iron Range, Refrigerator Car #7122: Sold to the Mid-Continent Railway Museum
- Duluth, Missabe & Iron Range, EMD SD-M #316: Traded for Northern Pacific #245
- Metra, Bi-Level Coach #7781: Scrapped
- Milwaukee Road, EMD F7B #X1: Sold to the Escanaba & Lake Superior Railroad
- Minntac, EMD SW9 #935: Sold to Cargill, to provide funds for the purchase of GN #192
- North Shore Scenic Railroad #652, EMD GP9, Ex-MKT 95: Sold to Minnesota Northern as ILSX 1380.
- Northern States Power Co, EMD SW1 #1364: Given to Rail Legacy Museum, St. Cloud
- Peavey Grain Co, EMD SW1 #1279: Scrapped after engine seized

== See also ==
- List of heritage railroads in the United States
