= ALCO RS-27 =

American diesel locomotive

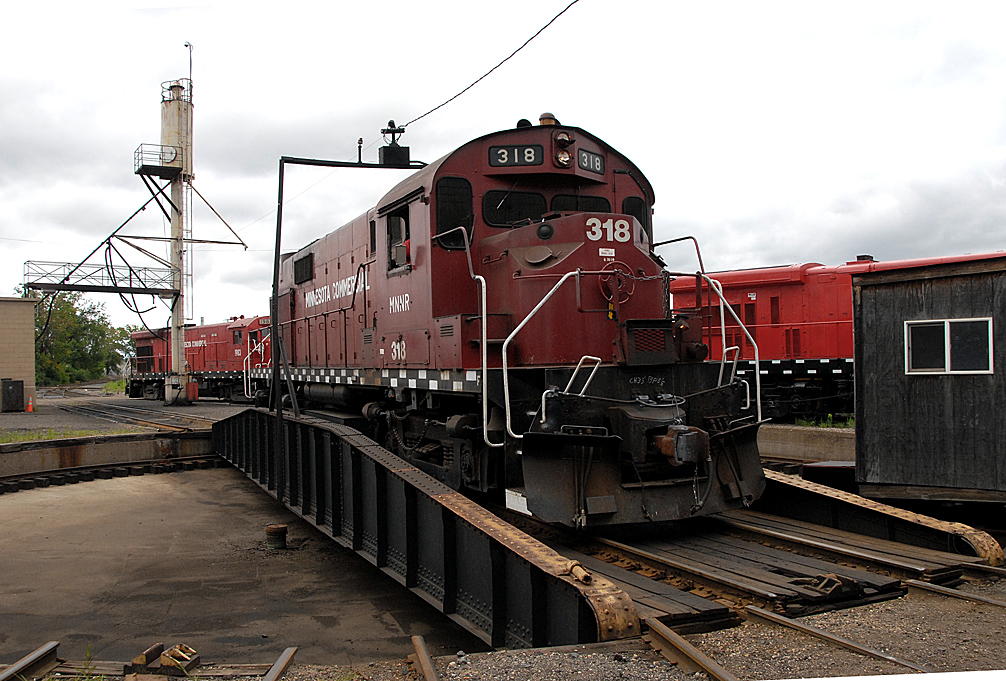
- Minnesota Commercial Railway 318 at Minneapolis, July 2009
Type and origin
- Power type: Diesel-electric
- Builder: ALCO
- Model: RS-27
- Build date: December 1959 – October 1962
- Total produced: 27
Specifications
- Configuration
  - AAR: B-B
- Gauge: 4 ft 8 1/2 in (1,435 mm)
- Trucks: AAR type B
- Wheel diameter: 40 in (1,016 mm)
- Minimum curve: 21°
- Wheelbase: 40 ft 4 in (12.29 m)
- Length: 57 ft 2 1/2 in (17.44 m)
- Width: 9 ft 11 1/8 in (3.03 m)
- Height: 14 ft 6 in (4.42 m)
- Loco weight: 256,800 lb (116,500 kg)
- Fuel capacity: 2,000 US gal (7,600 L)
- Prime mover: ALCO 251
- RPM range: 1000
- Engine type: Four-stroke diesel
- Aspiration: Turbocharged
- Displacement: 10,688 cu in (175.14 L)
- Generator: GE 5GT-581-B1
- Traction motors: (4) GE 5GE-752-E3
- Cylinders: V16
- Cylinder size: 9 in × 10.5 in (229 mm × 267 mm)
Performance figures
- Power output: 2,400 hp (1.8 MW)
- Tractive effort: 64,200 lb (29,100 kg)
Career
- Locale: U.S.A.
- Disposition: 2 in storage, remainder scrapped

The ALCO RS-27 (specification DL-640) was a diesel-electric locomotive built by ALCO between December 1959 and October 1962.

Only 27 examples were manufactured. With ALCO's introduction of the Century Series line in 1963, the C-424 (specification DL-640A) replaced the RS-27 in the builder's catalog. Today, the Minnesota Commercial Railway has the only two RS-27s left in existence; however both have been placed into storage.

== Original owners ==
Image	Railroad	Quantity	Road numbers	Notes
	American Locomotive Company (demonstrator)	5	640-1 to 640-5	640-1 rebuilt as C424 for Pennsylvania Railroad, 640-2 through 640-5 to Union Pacific Railroad 675–678; 678 wrecked 1969, 675–676 sold 1971 to Montreal Locomotive Works and used as lease fleet on Roberval and Saguenay Railway and British Columbia Railway, sold to Devco Railway 1974, renumbered 214-215, scrapped 1984
	Chicago and North Western Railway	4	900–903	One sold to Peabody Coal, three sold to Green Bay and Western 316–318; GBW 317 scrapped, 316 and 318 to Minnesota Commercial Railway
	Green Bay and Western Railroad	1	310	
	Pennsylvania Railroad	15	2400–2414	to Penn Central and Conrail (same numbers)
	Soo Line Railroad	2	415–416	
	Total	27		

== See also ==
- List of ALCO diesel locomotives
