= North Shore Scenic Railroad =

Heritage Railroad

Coordinates: 46°46′53″N 92°06′13″W

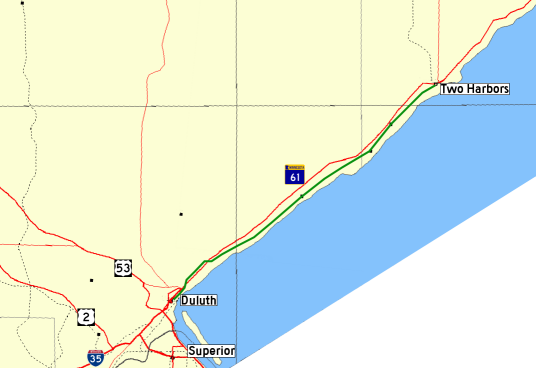
- Route of the North Shore Scenic Railroad

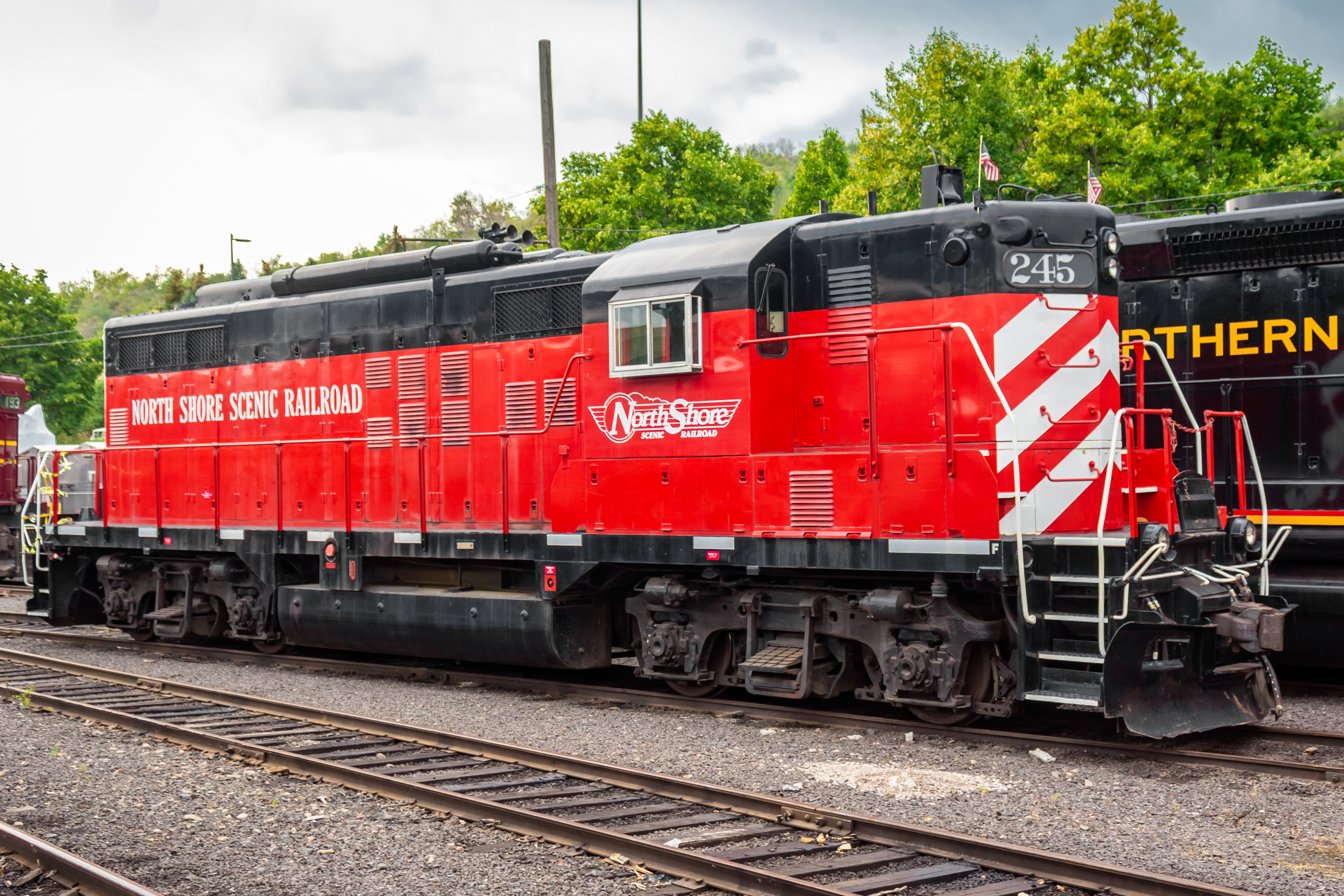
- North Shore Scenic Railroad GP9 245

Overview
- Operator: Lake Superior Railroad Museum
- Reporting mark: NSSR, LSRM, LSRX
- Locale: Duluth, Minnesota
- Dates of operation: 1990–present

Technical
- Track gauge: 4 ft 8 1/2 in (1,435 mm) standard gauge
- Length: 28 miles (45 km)

Other
- Website: duluthtrains.com

The North Shore Scenic Railroad (reporting mark LSRX) is a heritage railroad that operates between Duluth and Two Harbors, Minnesota, United States, along 28 miles (45 km) of the Lakefront Line, once part of the Duluth, Missabe and Iron Range Railroad.

Owned by the Lake Superior Railroad Museum, the NSSR operates out of the former Duluth Union Depot, now the St. Louis County Depot. Ridership hit 110,000 in 2018, the railroad's record.

== History ==
The North Shore Scenic Railroad operates excursions along the historic Lakefront Line, a 26-mile (42 km) section of rail between Duluth and Two Harbors. This rail corridor served a vital link in the transportation system for over 100 years. Known originally as the Lake Division, it connected the isolated Duluth and Iron Range Railway with America's expanding rail network. In 1886, when the Lakefront Line was first built, it was joined by a one-mile (1.6 km) extension of the St. Paul and Duluth Railway at Fifth Avenue East in Duluth, providing the D&IR with access to downtown Duluth as well as to other railroad carriers at the Head of the Lakes.

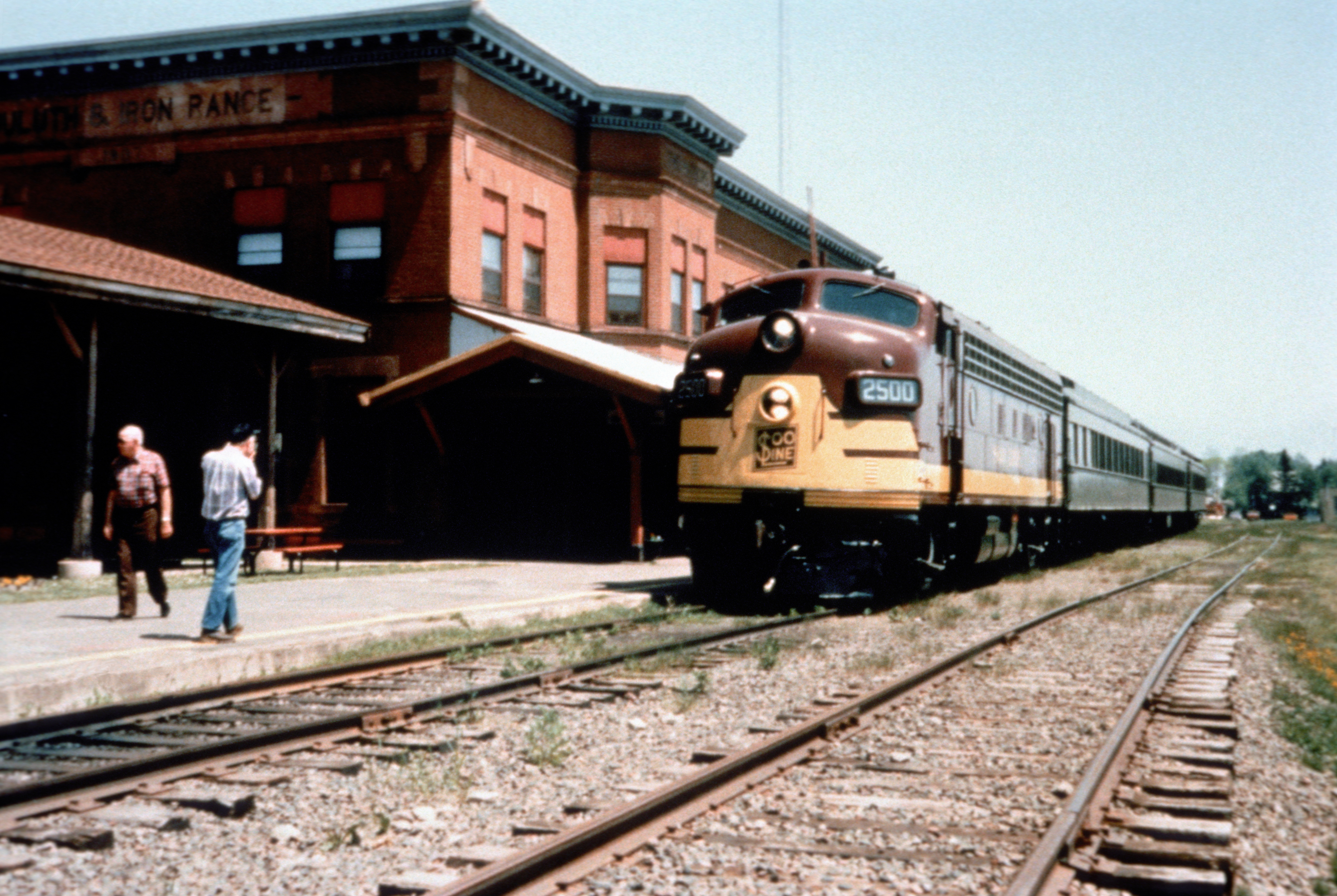
A train laying over at Two Harbors station before returning to Duluth, 1991

The scenic railroad began operating in 1990, by Donald Shank, former general manager and vice president of the Duluth, Mesabi & Iron Range Railway, began the North Shore Scenic Railroad. He operated the railroad for one season, using both county and private funding. In 1991, the Goldfines, a local family, took over operation of the railroad. They operated as a for-profit entity, using equipment they had purchased. The Goldfines operated the railroad for five seasons. By 1996, the Lake Superior Railroad Museum assumed operation of the North Shore Scenic Railroad. Operating with a strong corps of volunteers and a fleet of historic museum equipment, the North Shore Scenic Railroad has grown into an educational and historically significant operation.

The railroad operates several locomotives, notably Great Northern Railway EMD NW5 192, DM&IR EMD SD18 193, Budd Rail Diesel Car 9169, Soo Line EMD GP30 700, and Soo Line EMD FP7 2500. Many steam locomotives have seen excursion service in one form or another. The first to operate was Duluth & Northern Minnesota 14, followed by Soo Line 1003 and Milwaukee Road 261, and (most recently) Soo Line 2719. The Duluth & Northeastern 28, a newly restored 2-8-0 Consolidation built in 1906 is now being used by the NSSR following its restoration.

Milwaukee Road 261 makes occasional visits to Duluth, during which some cars from its excursion train are joined with some of the LSRM's equipment for a dinner special.

== Operating schedules ==
From May until December, the NSSR operates several daily excursions; after Labor Day, the NSSR reduces service to weekends only.

The 75-minute Duluth Zephyr runs several times a day during the main operating season. Vintage train cars are pulled by a vintage diesel engine through Duluth to the Lester River at the north end of the city. Passengers watch the engine uncouple, move to the back of the train, and pull it back to the station.

The Northwoods Explorer is a 2.5 hour excursion during the day, operating on weekends. It follows the same route as our evening trains, making for a longer ride up the shore and back, with both Coach and First Class Options. This ride is an extension of shorter, Duluth Zephyr ride offered earlier in the day.

The railroad also offers 2.5-hour Pizza and Elegant Dinner excursions from Duluth to Knife River.

From July through September, the NSSR runs the Two Harbors Turn (becoming the Fall Colors Train to Two Harbors from mid-September to early October), a six-hour excursion with a stop for passengers to explore the historic Two Harbors Depot and town.

== Special event trains ==
NSSR operates trains for special events, including a murder mystery train, a summer BBQ train, and holiday trains in the fall and winter. Others have included:

- "Day Out with Thomas" featuring a life-sized Thomas the Tank Engine, on certain July and August weekends.
- The Great Pumpkin Train travels to a pumpkin patch set up for train passengers.
- The Christmas City Express provides a storybook presentation based on the local book of the same name and service to Bentleyville.

The public may also charter trains or rent a caboose on the Duluth Zephyr for up to 10 passengers.

On occasion, the NSSR will run a special Streamliner, featuring Soo Line 2500 and Erie Mining Company 4211 pulling the finest passenger cars of the LSRM collection.

== See also ==
- List of heritage railroads in the United States
