= EMD GP30 =

Model of American 2250 hp diesel locomotive

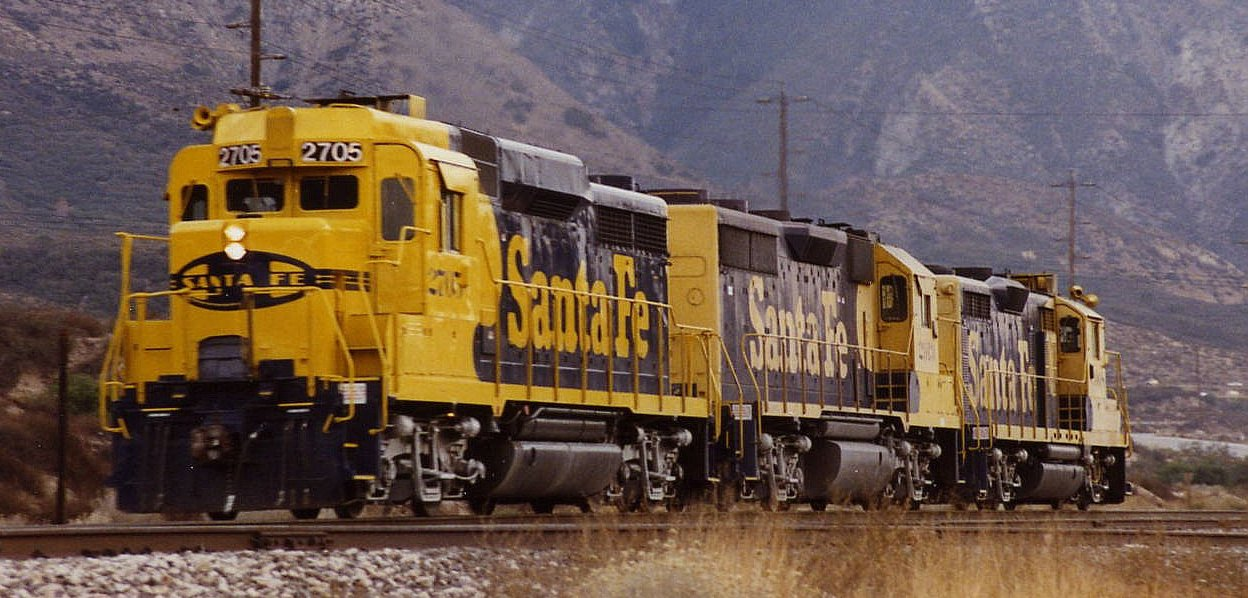
- A GP30, GP35, and GP20 run light in the late 1980s on California's Cajon Pass
Type and origin
- Power type: Diesel-electric
- Builder: GM Electro-Motive Division (EMD); General Motors Diesel (GMD)
- Model: GP30
- Build date: July 1961 – November 1963
- Total produced: 948
Specifications
- Configuration
  - AAR: B-B
  - UIC: Bo′Bo′
- Gauge: 4 ft 8 1/2 in (1,435 mm)
- Wheel diameter: 40 in (1.02 m)
- Length: 56 ft 2 in (17.12 m)
- Width: 10 ft 4 in (3.15 m)
- Height: 15 ft 11 in (4.85 m)
- Loco weight: 245,000 lb (111,130 kg)
- Fuel capacity: 1,700–2,600 US gal (6,400–9,800 L; 1,400–2,200 imp gal)
- Lubricant cap.: 243 US gal (920 L; 202 imp gal)
- Coolant cap.: 251 US gal (950 L; 209 imp gal)
- Sandbox cap.: 18 cu ft (0.51 m^{3})
- Prime mover: EMD 16-567D3
- RPM
  - RPM idle: 275
  - Maximum RPM: 835
- Engine type: Two-stroke V16 diesel
- Aspiration: Turbocharger
- Generator: EMD D22
- Traction motors: 4 × EMD D57
- Cylinders: 16
- Cylinder size: 8 1/2 in × 10 in (216 mm × 254 mm)
- Gear ratio: 62:15; 61:16; 60:17
- Loco brake: Schedule 26L Straight air, optional: dynamic
Performance figures
- Maximum speed: 71–83 mph (114–134 km/h)
- Power output: 2,250 hp (1,680 kW)
Career
- Locale: North America

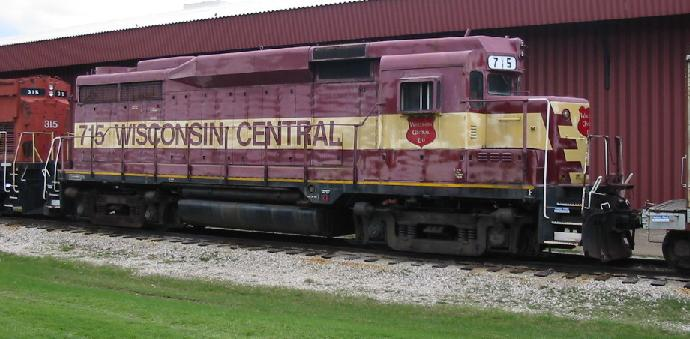
WC 715 at the National Railroad Museum in Green Bay, WI

The EMD GP30 is a 2,250 hp (1,680 kW) four-axle diesel-electric locomotive built by General Motors Electro-Motive Division of La Grange, Illinois between July 1961 and November 1963. A total of 948 units were built for railroads in the United States and Canada (2 only), including 40 cabless B units for the Union Pacific Railroad.

It was the first so-called "second generation" EMD diesel locomotive, and was produced in response to increased competition by a new entrant, General Electric's U25B, which was released in 1959. The GP30 is easily recognizable due to its high profile and stepped cab roof, unique among American locomotives. A number are still in service today in original or rebuilt form.

== History ==
=== Development ===
The GP30 was conceived out of the necessity of matching new competitor GE's U25B. The U25B offered 2,500 hp (1,860 kW) while EMD's GP20 and its 567D2 prime mover was only rated at 2,000 hp (1,490 kW). The U25B also featured a sealed, airtight long hood with a single inertial air intake for electrical cooling, with a pressurized cooling system which kept dust out of the engine and equipment area. Finally, the entire GE design was optimized for ease of access and maintenance. The U25B demonstrators were receiving much praise—and orders—from the railroads that tested them. Meanwhile, ALCO had been producing the 2,400 hp (1,800 kW) RS-27 since 1959, though it had not sold well.

EMD's engineering department pushed their DC traction system for an extra 250 hp (186 kW). The 2,250 hp (1,680 kW) wasn't quite equivalent to the GE and ALCO offerings, but EMD hoped the railroads' familiarity with EMD equipment would improve their chances. The locomotive in which the 16 cylinder, 567D3 would be fitted, was improved along the lines of the U25B; sealed long hood, central air intake, and engineered for easier maintenance access. The frame and trucks of the GP20 were carried across; the extra equipment for the centralized air system required more space behind the cab, and since the locomotive was not going to be lengthened, extra space was achieved vertically by raising the height of the locomotive, giving room for the central air system, turbocharger and electrical cabinet all behind the cab. This extra height behind the cab meant that the body style used for previous GP units was not suitable.

Since EMD wanted the new locomotive to be visibly modern and updated, they turned to the GM Automotive Styling Center at Troy, Michigan for help. The automobile stylists created the GP30's trademark "hump" and cab roof profile. The hump-like bulge started at the front of the cab and enveloped the air intakes for the central air system and the dynamic brake blister. Units ordered without dynamic brakes were the same shape, but lacked the intakes to cool the dynamic brake resistor grids.

A high short hood could be ordered, but only holdouts Norfolk and Western Railway and Southern Railway received such units. EMD originally planned to name the locomotive the GP22, but EMD's marketing department decided to leapfrog GE's numbering to make the new locomotive seem more advanced. Marketing literature claimed 30 distinct improvements from the GP20 and that this was the reason for the number.

=== Sales and in service ===
The GP30 successfully countered the GE threat and kept EMD in the dominant position in the North American diesel market. While losing a little power to the GE and ALCO competition, the solidity and reliability of the GP30—and the familiarity of railroad mechanical departments with EMD products—ultimately won many more orders for EMD. 948 were sold, in comparison to 476 U25Bs. In addition, the GP30 was only sold until the end of 1963, while the U25B was available until 1966.

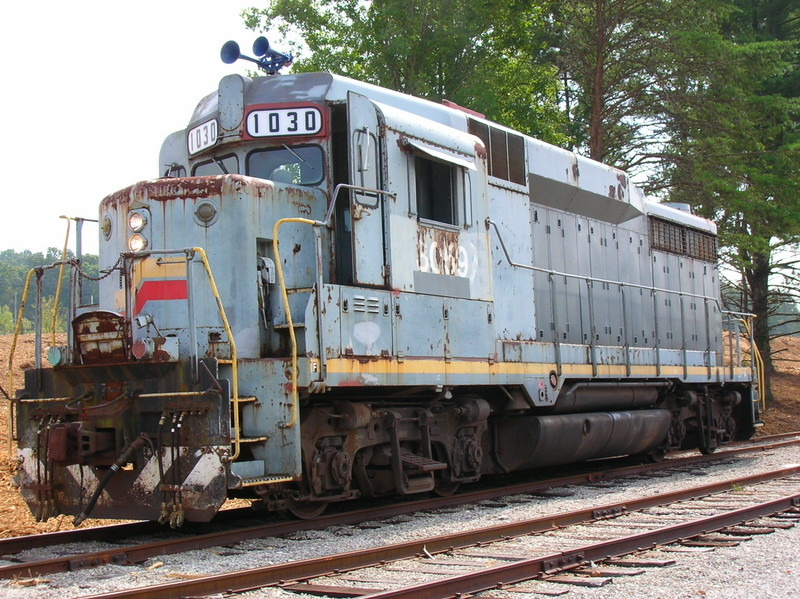
An EMD GP30 originally owned by the Louisville and Nashville Railroad -- Oak Ridge, TN

Most major railroads ordered GP30s, and many smaller ones did too. The largest orders were from the SOU (120), UP (111), ATSF (85), and the B&O (77).

The sole purchaser of B units (by the mid-1960s generally an outdated concept) was the UP, who kept the practice of running its locomotives in matched sets much longer than others. Thirteen of those GP30B units were fitted with steam generators for heating passenger trains, the only GP30s to receive them. Prior to Amtrak, UP would use a GP30 and two boiler equipped GP30Bs on passenger trains when no E8s or E9s were available.

Some units for the GM&O, MILW and SOO were built using trucks from ALCO trade-ins and therefore ride on AAR type B trucks instead of the EMD standard Blomberg Bs. An indisputable tribute to the quality of the GP30 design is the fact that a good number are still in service as of 2015, which is a service lifespan of over 50 years and well in excess of the design life of 25–30 years for the average diesel locomotive. Furthermore, when life-expired, some railroads chose to give them major rebuilds instead of scrapping them.

== Original buyers ==
=== Cab-equipped 'A' units ===
Railroad	Quantity	Road numbers	Notes
Electro Motive Division (demonstrator)	2	5629	to Union Pacific Railroad 875
Electro Motive Division (demonstrator)	2	5639	to Seaboard Air Line Railroad 534, to Seaboard Coast Line Railroad 1343
Alaska Railroad	1	2000	
Atchison, Topeka and Santa Fe Railway	85	1200–1284	Renumbered 3200–3284. Rebuilt versions called GP30u**upgraded at Cleburne, Texas shops.
Atlantic Coast Line Railroad	9	900–908	to Seaboard Coast Line Railroad 1300–1308
Baltimore and Ohio Railroad	77	6900–6976	
Chesapeake and Ohio Railway	48	3000–3047	
Chicago, Burlington and Quincy Railroad	38	940–977	to Burlington Northern Railroad 2217–2254
Chicago and Eastern Illinois Railroad	3	239–241	
Chicago Great Western Railway	8	201–208	to Chicago & North Western Railway 802–809
Chicago, Milwaukee, St. Paul and Pacific Railroad	16	340–355	AAR type B trucks. Renumbered 1000–1015
Chicago and North Western Railway	14	810–823	
Canadian Pacific Railway	2	8200–8201	Built by General Motors Diesel (GMD) in London, Ontario. Renumbered 5000–5001
Denver and Rio Grande Western Railroad	28	3001–3028	
Great Northern Railway	17	3000–3016	to Burlington Northern Railroad 2200–2216
Gulf, Mobile and Ohio Railroad	31	500–530	AAR type B trucks
Kansas City Southern Railway	20	100–119	
Louisville and Nashville Railroad	58	1000–1057	
New York Central Railroad	10	6115–6124	to Penn Central 2188–2197, to Conrail same numbers
New York, Chicago and St. Louis Railroad	10	900–909	to Norfolk and Western 2900-2909, to Norfolk Southern same numbers
Norfolk and Western Railway	44	522–565	High short hood, operated long hood-forward
Pennsylvania Railroad	52	2200–2251	2250-2251 renumbered to Penn Central then Conrail 2198–2199, 2200–2249 to Penn Central then Conrail same numbers
Phelps Dodge Corporation	9	24–32	New Cornelia Branch mine
Reading Company	20	5501–5520	renumbered 3600–3619; to Conrail 2168-2187
Seaboard Air Line Railroad	34	500–533	to Seaboard Coast Line Railroad 1309–1342
Soo Line Railroad	22	700–721	AAR type B trucks. Eighteen to Wisconsin Central Limited, same numbers
Southern Pacific Railroad	8	7400–7407	
Southern Railway	120	2525–2644	High short hood
St. Louis Southwestern Railway	10	750–759	
Toledo, Peoria and Western Railway	1	700	To ATSF as 3285
Union Pacific Railroad	111	700–735, 800–874	
Totals	908		

=== Cabless booster 'B' units ===
Railroad	Quantity	Road numbers	Notes
Union Pacific Railroad	40	700B–739B	Thirteen units, 727B-739B, fitted with steam generators
Totals	40		

== Rebuilds ==
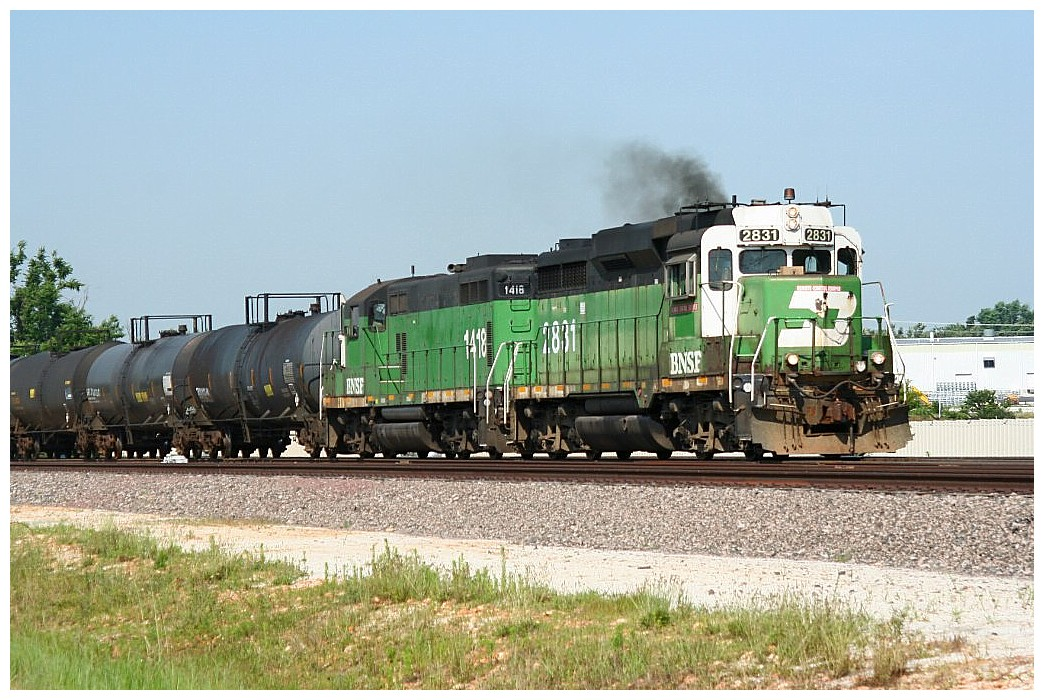
BNSF #2831, a GP39M, leading BNSF #1418, a GP10

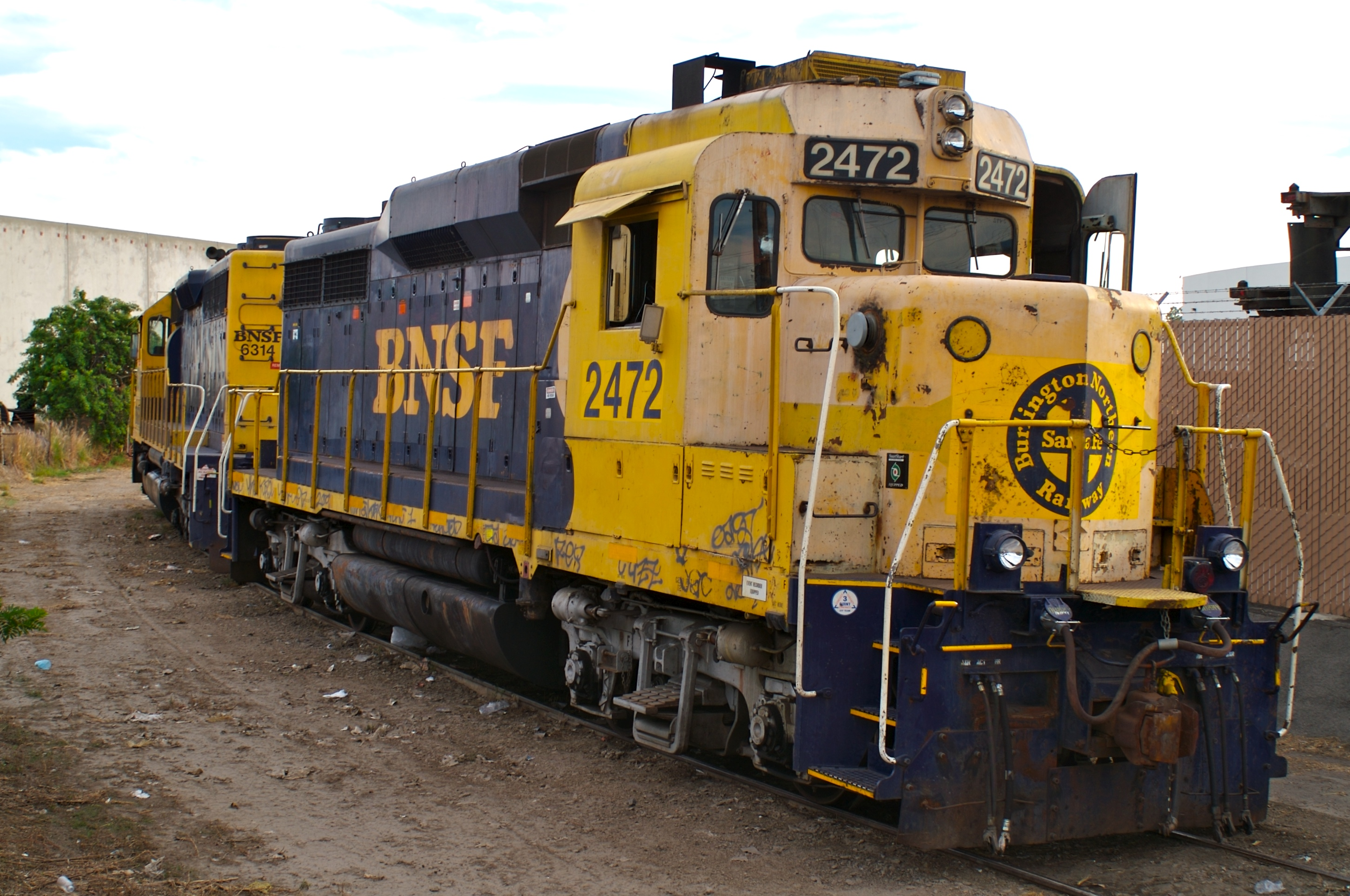
BNSF #2472, a GP30u

The Burlington Northern Railroad was the most extensive user of rebuilt GP30s. Finding a need for modernized units of lower power, it sent GP30s—-both its own and units purchased from other railroads-—to be rebuilt to the specifications of the later GP39. Seventy units were sent to EMD, 65 to Morrison Knudsen (now Washington Group International) and 25 to VMV Paducahbilt in Paducah for rebuilding, and the rebuilds are known as GP39E, GP39M, and GP39V respectively. The changes included new generators, Dash-2 modular electronic control systems and 567D3 engines upgraded with EMD 645-series power assemblies, rated at 2,300 hp (1,720 kW) and designated 12-645D3. Some of these units received new EMD spartan cabs. These units are still in service on locals and smaller lines throughout the BNSF Railway system.

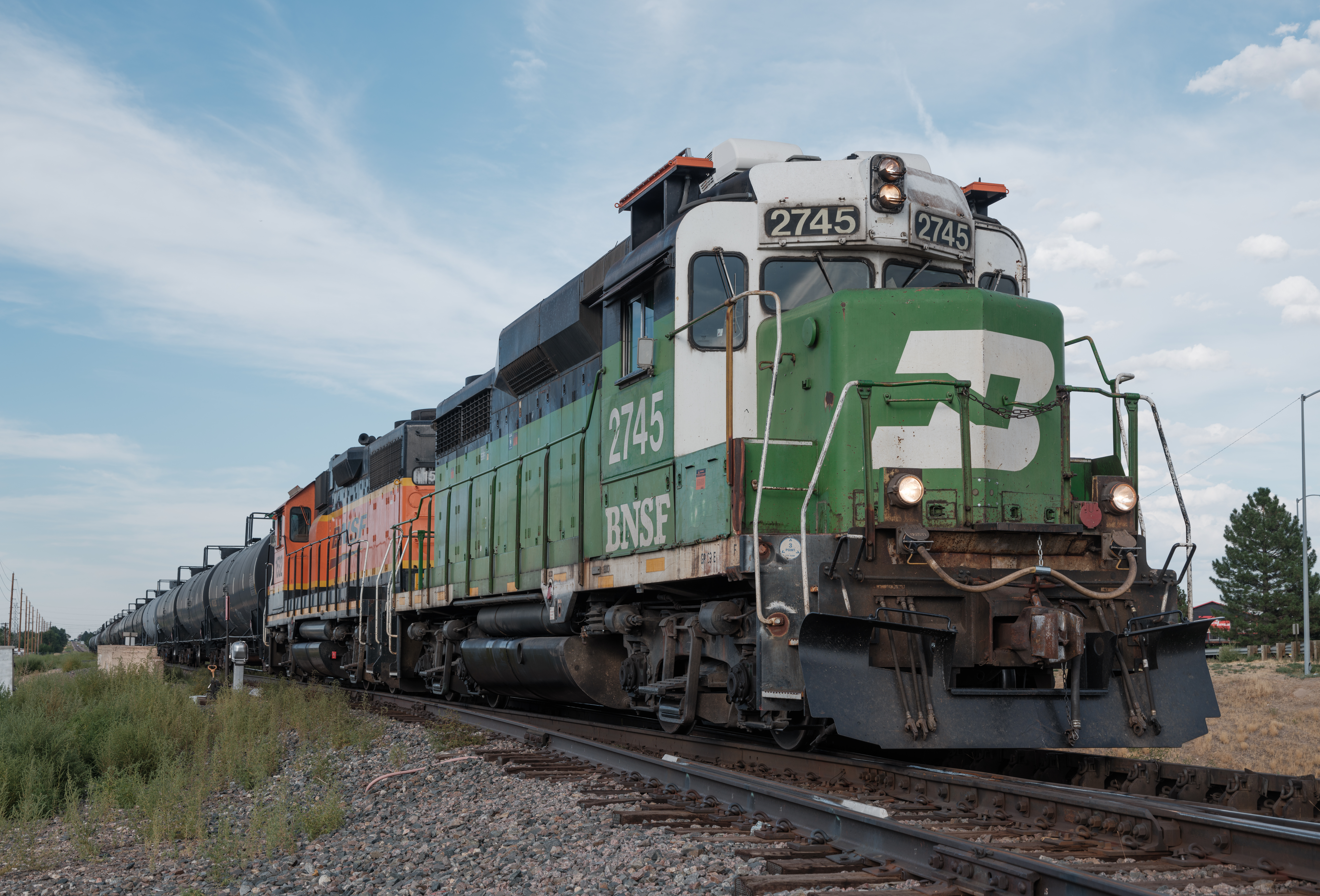
BNSF #2745, a GP39E

The Atchison, Topeka and Santa Fe Railway (ATSF) had previously performed a similar upgrade in its own Cleburne, Texas shops, stripping the locomotives down to bare metal and rebuilding with new equipment. The 567D3 engines were upgraded to a 2500-horsepower rating by the use of 645-series power assemblies. The generators and traction motors were upgraded and control and electrical equipment was replaced. The trucks received Hyatt roller bearings and single-shoe brake systems. Rooftop air conditioners and new horns were added. The locomotives were repainted in the blue and yellow Yellowbonnet scheme, and designated GP30u (for upgraded). 78 of these survived until the BNSF merger, and were eventually all sold off. In 2016, BNSF traded Larry's Truck and Electric 26 GP38s for 24 of the former ATSF GP30us for their GP39-3 rebuild program. The Reading Blue Mountain and Northern Railroad acquired a total of six of the former BNSF/ATSF GP30us from Larry's and designates them as GP39RN locomotives.

The Soo Line Railroad rebuilt three GP30s with CAT 3516 engines rated at 2,000 horsepower (1.49 MW). These were designated GP30C.

The Illinois Central Gulf Railroad rebuilt two GP30s in the early 1980s. These units were designated GP26. As of 2018, the units remain in service on the Cimarron Valley Railroad.

The Chessie System rebuilt its GP30 units into GP30Ms, adding newer components, new traction motors and reducing their power to 2000 hp. They lasted with CSX into the mid-to-late 1990s, long after Seaboard System GP30s had been sold, retired and scrapped, or turned into road slugs.

== Preservation ==
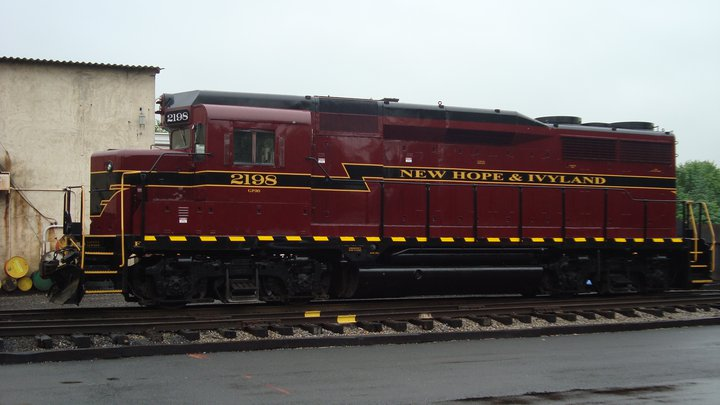
New Hope and Ivyland Railroad 2198

Many GP30s have been preserved by a variety of museums, societies and tourist railways. All preserved examples are cab units, as the cabless booster units have been scrapped. A number of these preserved locomotives are in operational condition.

== See also ==
- List of GM-EMD locomotives
- List of GMD Locomotives

== Bibliography and external links ==
- Moran, Miles (1975). "And Passenger Service Too". Railroad Modeler. 5 (8): 40–47.
- Goodman, Eric. ATSF GP30u Project. Retrieved on February 1, 2005.
- Eck H. C. (1977). The Modern Locomotive Handbook. The Railway Fuel and Operating Officers Assoc.
- Hayden, Bob, ed. (1980). Model Railroader Cyclopedia-Volume 2: Diesel Locomotives. Kalmbach Books. ISBN 0-89024-547-9.
- "The History of EMD Diesel Engines". Pacific Southwest Railway Museum. Archived from the original on July 22, 2014.
- Komanesky, John. Preserved EMD Locomotives: All except Cab Units and Switchers. Retrieved on February 2, 2005.
- Pinkepank, Jerry A. (1973). The Second Diesel Spotter's Guide. Kalmbach Publishing Co., Milwaukee, WI. ISBN 0-89024-026-4.
- Sarberenyi, Robert. EMD GP30 Original Owners. Retrieved on August 27, 2006
- Strack, Don. Union Pacific's EMD GP30s. Retrieved on February 2, 2005.
- Trainpix.com. BNSF Motive Power Roster. Retrieved on February 1, 2005.
- The Alberta Railway Museum website. Retrieved on February 19, 2011.
- Build dates, order and serial numbers
