= Northern Pacific Railway locomotives =

List of locomotives used by the Northern Pacific Railway

== Steam locomotive classes ==
Below is a table of information for the Northern Pacific Railway’s steam roster with a symbol, Whyte notation, common name and notes. (The notes were compiled by Richard Boyland and Wes Barris and first posted May 30, 1991, to the electronic newsgroup rec.railroad.) Included is a breakdown of the Northern Pacific classes, along with the date of their first construction (when known), builder, and road numbers.

=== 0-4-0 ===
Image	Class	Wheel arrangement	Fleet number(s)	Manufacturer	Serial numbers	Year made	Quantity made	Quantity preserved	Year(s) retired	Comments
	0-4-0 — OO									
	Minnetonka	0-4-0ST+T		Smith and Porter		1870	4	1		NP's first locomotives; Minnetonka preserved
	H	0-4-0	1050–1064	Baldwin	4968...7053	1880–1883	15	0		
	H-1	0-4-0	1070	Baldwin	2537	1871	1	0	1926	Rebuilt as 0-4-0T shop switcher 11
	H-2	0-4-0	1003	Rhode Island		1883	1	0		Ex St. Paul and Duluth Railroad 37
	H-3	0-4-0	1004	Rhode Island		1883	1	0		
	H-4	0-4-0	1071	Grant			1	0		
	H-5	0-4-0	1072	Rhode Island			1	0		
		0-4-0T	Shop 12	Baldwin	10231	1889	1	0	1936	Ex HHS&S
		0-4-0F	Shop 8	H. K. Porter	7979	1945	1	1		Fireless locomotive for tie creosoting plant

=== 0-6-0 ===
Image	Class	Wheel arrangement	Fleet number(s)	Manufacturer	Serial numbers	Year made	Quantity made	Quantity preserved	Year(s) retired	Comments
	0-6-0 — OOO									
	I	0-6-0	982–999	Baldwin	6685...8628	1883–1887	18	0		
	I-1	0-6-0	981	NP		1891	1	0		
	I-2	0-6-0	1000–1002	Dickson	611–613	1887	3	0		Ex St. Paul and Duluth Railroad 60–62
	K-1	0-6-0	948–976	Baldwin	5565...6519	1881–1882	29	0		Rebuilt from 2-6-0
	K-2	0-6-0	980	Baldwin	6506	1882	1	0		Rebuilt from 2-6-0
	L	0-6-0	977–979	Baldwin	6936...6946	1883	3	0		
	L-1	0-6-0	940–941	Grant	1784–1785	1889	2	0		
	L-2	0-6-0	930–939	Rome	253...650	1887–1890	10	0		
	L-3	0-6-0	929	Rome	506	1889	1	0		
	L-4	0-6-0	926–928	Baldwin	14795–14797	1896	3	1		Ex St. Paul and Duluth Railroad 70–72; 927 rebuilt as 0–6–0T shop switcher 10 preserved
	L-5	0-6-0	923–925	Rogers	5424–5426	1899	3	1		Ex St. Paul and Duluth Railroad 73–75; 924 Under restoration Snoqualmie, Wa
	L-6	0-6-0	900–919	Schenectady	59536–5955	1901	20	0	1928–1947	914 rebuilt as 0–6–0T shop switcher 9 in 1931
	L-7	0-6-0	1020–1035	Baldwin; Alco (Schen.)	20107...20775; 27361–27366	1902–1903	15	1	1929–1956	1031 preserved
	L-8	0-6-0	922	Baldwin	11372	1890	1	0	1938	
	L-9	0-6-0	1040–1134	Alco (M / D / P); Baldwin	39528...46914; 29858...34609	1906–1910	95	2	1930s–1950s	1068 and 1070 preserved
	L-10	0-6-0	1160–1169	Alco (Schen.)	52025–52034	1912	10	0	1950s	

=== 0-8-0 ===
Image	Class	Wheel arrangement	Fleet number(s)	Manufacturer	Serial numbers	Year made	Quantity made	Quantity preserved	Year(s) retired	Comments
	0-8-0 — OOOO									
	G	0-8-0	1151–1159	NP		1906 (rebuilt)	9	0	1929–1937	Rebuilt from class F 2-8-0 locomotives
	G-1	0-8-0	1170–1173	Alco (Brooks)	61229–61232	1919	4	0	1950s	USRA 0-8-0
	G-2	0-8-0	1174–1193	Alco (Brooks)	62473–62492	1920	20	0	1950s	USRA 0-8-0 copies

=== 2-6-0 ===
Image	Class	Wheel arrangement	Fleet number(s)	Manufacturer	Serial numbers	Year made	Quantity made	Quantity preserved	Year(s) retired	Comments
	2-6-0 — oOOO — Mogul									
	D	2-6-0	580–591	Baldwin	6851...6909	1883	12	0		
	D-1	2-6-0	942–947	Baldwin	5636...5701	1881	6	0		Rebuilt as 0–6–0
	D-2	2-6-0	550–572	Baldwin	9544...9688	1888–1889	23	0		
	D-3	2-6-0	420–424, 450–547	Baldwin	10178...11984	1889–1891	103	0		
	D-5	2-6-0	404–418, 426–432	Baldwin	10298...11968	1889–1891	22	0		
	D-6	2-6-0	400–403	Rogers	4842...5433	1893–1899	4	0		Ex St. Paul and Duluth Railroad 63–66
	K	2-6-0	595–599	Baldwin	6590...6629	1883	5	0		

=== 2-6-2 ===
Image	Class	Wheel arrangement	Fleet number(s)	Manufacturer	Serial numbers	Year made	Quantity made	Quantity preserved	Year(s) retired	Comments
	2-6-2 — oOOOo — Prairie									
	T	2-6-2	2300–2449	Alco (Brooks)	39508...42264	1906–1907	150	1	1924–1959	6 rebuilt as class W-4 (2-8-2); 18 rebuilt as class T-1 2435 survives
	T-1	2-6-2	2450–2467	NP		1926–1929 (rebuilt)	18	0	1941–1959	Rebuilt from class T

=== 2-8-0 ===
Image	Class	Wheel arrangement	Fleet number(s)	Manufacturer	Serial numbers	Year made	Quantity made	Quantity preserved	Year(s) retired	Comments
	2-8-0 — oOOOO — Consolidation									
	F	2-8-0	95–103	Baldwin	6591...7002	1883	9	0		Rebuilt to class G (0–8–0) in 1906
	F-1	2-8-0	50–81	Baldwin	9505...11959	1888–1891	32	0	1926–1951	
	F-2	2-8-0	82–83	Baldwin		1888	2	0	1927–1928	
	F-3	2-8-0	84–91	Rome	455...651	1889–1890	8	0	1920s/30s	
	F-4	2-8-0	92–94	Grant	1714–1716	1887	3	0		
	F-5	2-8-0	45–46	Schenectady		1900	2	0	1926	Ex Seattle and International Railway 11–12; Rebuilt as 0–8–0
	F-6	2-8-0	47	Richmond		1895	1	0	1927	Ex Seattle and International Railway 8; Rebuilt as 0–8–0
	F-7	2-8-0	48–49	Rhode Island	1882–1883	1888	2	0		Ex Seattle and International Railway 7 & 9
	F-8	2-8-0	4–6	PRR Altoona		1891	3	0		
	Y	2-8-0	30–43	Schenectady	4900...4913	1898	14	0	1941–1955	
	Y-1	2-8-0	17–29	Schenectady	5468–5480	1899–1900	13	1	1925–1958	Ex Civic Center, Butte MT 25 preserved
	Y-2	2-8-0	1250–1279	Schenectady; Alco (Richmond)	5881–5892; 25815–25832	1901–1902	30	0	1925–1958	
	Y-3	2-8-0	1200–1213	Schenectady	5893–5906	1901	14	0	1945–1955	
	Y-4	2-8-0	1280–1293	Alco (Schen.)	27347–27360	1903	14	0	1925–1935	
	Y-5	2-8-0	1214–1223	Alco (Schen.)	27337–27346	1903	10	0	1927–1937	

=== 2-8-2 ===
Image	Class	Wheel arrangement	Fleet number(s)	Manufacturer	Serial numbers	Year made	Quantity made	Quantity preserved	Year(s) retired	Comments
	2-8-2 — oOOOOo — Mikado									
	W	2-8-2	1500–1659	Alco (Brooks)	30203...42234	1904–1907	160	0	1930–1959	
	W-1	2-8-2	1660–1699	Alco (Schen.)	46840–46879	1910	40	0	1925–1958	
	W-2	2-8-2	1900–1919	Alco (Brooks)	30222...31134	1904–1905	20	0	1930–1958	Built as tandem compound locomotives
	W-3	2-8-2	1700–1834	Alco (Brooks)	52849...62466	1913–1920	135	1	1926–1960	Ten sold to Spokane, Portland and Seattle Railway as their 530–539; 539 is preserved. No. 1776 pulled the farewell to steam excursions for the NP in 1957.
	W-4	2-8-2	2500–2505	NP (Brainerd Shops)		1919 (rebuilt)	6	0	1955–1958	Rebuilt from class T 2-6-2 locomotives
	W-5	2-8-2	1835–1859	Alco (Schen.)	64348–64372	1923	25	0	1952–1960	

=== 2-10-0 ===
Image	Class	Wheel arrangement	Fleet number(s)	Manufacturer	Serial numbers	Year made	Quantity made	Quantity preserved	Year(s) retired	Comments
	2-10-0 — oOOOOO — Decapod									
	M	2-10-0	1–2	Baldwin	8168–8169	1886	2	0	1930–1933	

On the NP the Decapods were used at either end of a very short train over the temporary switchback line across Stampede Pass while Stampede Tunnel was being constructed between 1887 and 1888. They featured blind drivers (no flanges on the wheels) for operation on sharp curves. They were later relegated to use as yard switchers.

=== 4-4-0 ===
Image	Class	Wheel arrangement	Fleet number(s)	Manufacturer	Serial numbers	Year made	Quantity made	Quantity preserved	Year(s) retired	Comments
	4-4-0 — ooOO — American									
	25½C	4-4-0	3–26	Baldwin	2639...2662	1871–1873	23	1		21 sold in 1877 to the Canadian Pacific Railway and became CPR no. 1 Countess of Dufferin, and is preserved as such.
	B	4-4-0	650–671	Baldwin	8560...8688	1887	22	0		
	B-1	4-4-0	672–673	Baldwin	10247...10252	1889	2	0		
	B-2	4-4-0	649	Schenectady		1887	1	0		
	B-3	4-4-0	691–692	Grant	1783, 1780	1888	2	0		
	C-1	4-4-0	680–691	New York	35–46	1883	12	1		684 preserved
	C-2	4-4-0	694–695	Baldwin	6581...6583	1883	2	0		
	C-3	4-4-0	696–740	Baldwin	6535...10692	1883–1890	45	0		
	C-4	4-4-0	741–742	Baldwin	5997...5999	1882	2	0		
	C-5	4-4-0	743–747	New York	6–10	1883	15	0		
	C-6	4-4-0	748–803	Portland	463–518	1888	56	0		
	C-7	4-4-0	817–818	Pittsburgh	862	1888	1	0		
	C-8	4-4-0	805–806	Taunton	829–830	1882	2	0		
	C-9	4-4-0	807–816	Hinkley	1548...1560	1882	10	0		
	C-10	4-4-0	817–818	Baldwin	5714...5902	1881	2	0		
	C-11	4-4-0	819–865	Baldwin	4584...6523	1879–1883	47	0		
	C-12	4-4-0	866–869	Manchester	868–871	1880–1881	4	0		
	C-13	4-4-0	870–898	Portland	376...461	1881–1883	29	0		
	C-14	4-4-0	899	Baldwin	5715	1881	1	0		
	C-19	4-4-0	675–678	Rome	249–252	1887	4	0		
	C-20	4-4-0	633–637	Dickson	605–609	1887	5	0		Ex St. Paul and Duluth Railroad 54–58
	C-21	4-4-0	638–640	Rome	350–352	1888	3	0		Ex St. Paul and Duluth Railroad 67–69
	C-22	4-4-0	1110–1118	Brooks	1105...1198	1886	8	0		Ex St. Paul and Duluth Railroad 41–48
	C-23	4-4-0	1123–1128	Rogers	2945–2948	1883	4	0		Ex St. Paul and Duluth Railroad 18–21
	C-24	4-4-0	1129–1130	McQueen		1881	2	0		
	C-25	4-4-0	1131–1134	Baldwin		1879	4	0		
	C-26	4-4-0	1135–1136	Baldwin		1870	2	0		
	C-27	4-4-0	1137	Baldwin		1870	1	0		
	C-28	4-4-0	1138–1139	Baldwin		1871	2	0		
	C-29	4-4-0	1140–1144	Baldwin		1874	5	0		
	C-30	4-4-0	1145–1148	Rhode Island	1779...1937	1887–1888	4	0		Ex Seattle and International Railway 1–4
	C-31	4-4-0	1149–1150	Rhode Island	2085–2086	1888	1	0		Ex Seattle and International Railway 101–102
	C-32	4-4-0	1151	Baldwin			1	0		
	C-33	4-4-0	1153				1	0		

=== 4-4-2 ===
Image	Class	Wheel arrangement	Fleet number(s)	Manufacturer	Serial numbers	Year made	Quantity made	Quantity preserved	Year(s) retired	Comments
	4-4-2 — ooOOo — Atlantic									
	N	4-4-2	600–602	Baldwin	17290–17292	1899	3	0	1927–1932	Ex St. Paul and Duluth Railroad 80–82
	N-1	4-4-2	603–605	Baldwin	33291–33293	1909	3	0	1936	

=== 4-6-0 ===
Image	Class	Wheel arrangement	Fleet number(s)	Manufacturer	Serial numbers	Year made	Quantity made	Quantity preserved	Year(s) retired	Comments
	4-6-0 — ooOOO — Ten-Wheeler									
	E	4-6-0	390–398	Baldwin	6392...7021	1882	9	0	1910s	
	E-1	4-6-0	360–364	Manchester	1407–1411	1888	5	0		
	E-2	4-6-0	370–383	Baldwin	9691...9704	1888	14	0	1926–1932	
	E-3	4-6-0	330–358	Baldwin	10182...11301	1889–1890	29	0	1925–1935	
	E-4	4-6-0	388–389	Rhode Island	2432–2433	1890	2	0		
	E-5	4-6-0	386–387	Schenectady	4072–4073	1893	2	0	1927	
	E-6	4-6-0	365	Rhode Island	2337	1890	1	0		
	E-7	4-6-0	366–368	Cooke	2223–2225	1892	3	0		
	E-8	4-6-0	369	Baldwin	11280	1890	1	0	1919	
	P	4-6-0	250–258, 270–278	Schenectady	4542...4726	1897–1898	18	0	1926–1941	
	P-1	4-6-0	207–218, 226–236	Schenectady; Alco (Schen.)	5122...5931, 25660...25841	1899–1902	23	0	1927–1940	
	P-2	4-6-0	240–249	Schenectady; Alco (Schen.)	5716...5929, 25657...25842	1901–1902	10	0	1935–1941	
	P-3	4-6-0	1400–1419	Schenectady; Alco (Rich.)	5916–5925, 25662–25671	1901–1902	20	0	1920s	
	R	4-6-0	170–189	Schenectady	4535...4593	1897	20	0	1920s	
	S	4-6-0	153–168	Schenectady	4727...4899	1898	16	0	1920s	
	S-1	4-6-0	134–147	Schenectady	5134...5147	1899	14	0	1926–1929	
	S-2	4-6-0	104–133	Schenectady	5473...5612	1900	30	0	1925–1928	
	S-3	4-6-0	1300–1323	Schenectady; Alco (Schen.)	5907–5915, 25650...25840	1901–1902	24	0	1926–1934	
	S-4	4-6-0	1350–1399	Baldwin	20273...20662	1907	40	4	1945–1958	1354, 1356, 1364 and 1382 preserved, with 1364 operational. 1372 used in "Farewell to Steam" excursions in 1956 and '57, scrapped shortly thereafter
	S-10	4-6-0	320–329	Alco (Rogers)	37575–37584	1907	10	1	1930–1950	328 preserved
	S-11	4-6-0	150–152	Grant	1766–1768	1888	3	0		

=== 4-6-2 ===
Image	Class	Wheel arrangement	Fleet number(s)	Manufacturer	Serial numbers	Year made	Quantity made	Quantity preserved	Year(s) retired	Comments
	4-6-2 — ooOOOo — Pacific									
	Q	4-6-2	2080–2099	Alco	27317–27336	1903	20	0	1929–1947	
	Q-1	4-6-2	2100–2147	Alco	30228...42501	1904–1907	48	0	1930–1952	
	Q-2	4-6-2	2175–2176	Alco	39999–40000	1906	2	0	1934	Built as Cole balanced compounds
	Q-3	4-6-2	2148–2170	Baldwin	33248...33627	1909	23	4	1945–1959	2152, 2153, 2156 and 2164 preserved
	Q-4	4-6-2	2177–2207	Baldwin	33796...34144	1909–1910	31	0	1931–1959	
	Q-4	4-6-2	2208–2225	Alco	48186–48203	1910	18	0	1931–1959	
	Q-5	4-6-2	2226–2235	Alco	62422–62441	1920	20	0	1947–1959	
	Q-6	4-6-2	2246–2265	Alco	64328–64347	1923	20	0	1953–1959	

=== 4-8-0 ===
Image	Class	Wheel arrangement	Fleet number(s)	Manufacturer	Serial Numbers	Year made	Quantity made	Quantity preserved	Year(s) retired	Comments
	4-8-0 — ooOOOO Twelve-Wheeler or Mastodon									
	X	4-8-0	13–16	Schenectady	4523–4526	1897	4	0	1936–1940	

=== 4-8-4 ===
Image	Class	Wheel arrangement	Fleet number(s)	Manufacturer	Serial numbers	Year made	Quantity made	Quantity preserved	Year(s) retired	Comments
	4-8-4 — ooOOOOoo — Northern									
	A	4-8-4	2600–2611	Alco	67010–67021	1926	12	0	1949–1959	Serial nos. not in order
	A-1	4-8-4	2626	Alco	68056	1930	1	0	1955	ex-Timken 1111
	A-2	4-8-4	2650–2659	Baldwin	61771–61780	1934–1935	10	0	1953–1958	
	A-3	4-8-4	2660–2667	Baldwin	62163–62170	1938	8	0	1954–1958	
	A-4	4-8-4	2670–2677	Baldwin	64155–64162	1941	8	0	1954–1958	
	A-5	4-8-4	2680–2689	Baldwin	64667–64676	1943	10	0	1957–1959	

=== Mallet and simple articulated locomotives ===
Image	Class	Wheel arrangement	Fleet number(s)	Manufacturer	Serial numbers	Year made	Quantity made	Quantity preserved	Year(s) retired	Comments
	Mallet and Simple Articulated Locomotives									
	Z	2-6-6-2	3000–3015	Baldwin	30566...31557	1907	16	0	1927–1939	
	Z-1	2-6-6-2	3100–3105	Baldwin	34389...34483	1910	6	0		
	Z-2	2-8-8-2	4000–4004	Baldwin	34382–34386	1910	5	0	1945	
	Z-3	2-8-8-2	4005–4025	Alco	52839...62472	1913, 1917, 1920	21	0	1945–1958	
	Z-4	2-8-8-2	4500–4503	Alco	64373–64376	1923	4	0	1951–1954	
	Z-5	2-8-8-4	5000	Alco	67578	1928	1	0	1952	
	Z-5	2-8-8-4	5001–5011	Baldwin	61292...61495	1930	11	0	1953–1957	
	Z-6	4-6-6-4	5100–5120	Alco	68760–68780	1936–1937	21	0	1955–1959	
	Z-7	4-6-6-4	5121–5126	Alco	69540–69545	1941	6	0	1956–1959	
	Z-8	4-6-6-4	5130–5149	Alco	70143...71962	1943–44	20	0	1955–1959	

Both of the Northern Pacific's 2-6-6-2 classes were copies of GN designs, including their Belpaire fireboxes, a rarity on NP steam locomotives. NP 3015, last of the Class Z's, had a troubled existence, suffering a crown sheet failure at Kennedy, Washington, on Stampede Pass circa 1916, then later derailing on the Wallace Branch in Idaho in 1933. In both instances the engine crew members were killed or injured.

The Z-2 2-8-8-2s wound up in helper service on Bozeman Pass. The Z-3s, purchased in successive batches, became the main line road and helper power on the route across Stampede Pass until the arrival of EMD's FTs in April, 1944. They were also used as helpers on the steep ascent of the NP's Prairie Line out of Tacoma, Washington, as well as in hauling wartime munitions trains over Stimson Hill between Elma, Washington and the Puget Sound Naval Shipyard at Bremerton, Washington, circa 1944–1945.

The Z-5 Yellowstones were two locomotives under one boiler, these were the largest locomotives in the world when delivered in 1928. They eliminated the use of two locomotives on the head-end of freight trains on the Yellowstone Division in eastern Montana and western North Dakota. The 2-8-8-4 was first built for the Northern Pacific Railway in 1928.

The 4-6-6-4 locomotives were so large that in many places in Montana the Northern Pacific had to widen the centers of its double track on the Rocky Mountain Division. As a rule they did not work west of Easton, Washington, due to the confines of Stampede Tunnel under the summit of Stampede Pass. Despite the inaccuracy, these classes were generally referred to by NP engine crews as Mallets.

== Diesel locomotives ==
=== American Locomotive Company ===
Northern Pacific Railway's Alcos were mostly confined to the east end of the road, on the Lake Superior and St. Paul Divisions.

Image	Model	hp	Quantity	Built	Road numbers	Notes
	HH-660	660	3	1940	600–602	Delivered as 125–127; first two sold to NP subsidiary Walla Walla Valley Railway
	S-1	660	1	1945	603	Delivered as 131
	S-2	1000	13	1941–1949	700–712	Delivered as 107–108, 113–118, 150–152
	S-4	1000	12	1951–1953	713–724	
	S-6	900	1	1955	750	
	RS-1	1000	4	1945	800–803	Delivered as 155–158
	RS-3	1600	14	1953–1955	850–863	
	RS-11	1800	18	1958–1960	900–917	

=== Baldwin Locomotive Works ===
Image	Model	hp	Quantity	Built	Road numbers	Notes
	VO-660	660	3	1940–1942	650–652	Delivered as 128–130
	VO-1000	1000	28	1941–1945	400–427	Delivered as 109–112, 119–124, 153–154, 159–174
	DRS 4-4-1500	1500	2	1948	500–501	Delivered as 175–176. Rebuilt 1959 and 1966 with EMD 567 engine
	DRS 6-6-1500	1500	1	1948	525	Delivered as 177. Rebuilt 1959 with EMD 567 engine

=== Electro-Motive Division ===
Image	Model	hp	Quantity	Built	Road numbers	Notes
	NW	1000	1	1938	100	Rebuilt 1956 by EMD as SW900m
	NW2	1000	7	1940–1948	99, 101–106	99 was New York, Ontario and Western 115, bought 1957
	SW7	1200	8	1949	107–114	
	SW9	1200	4	1952–1953	115–118	
	SW1200	1200	59	1955–1957	119–177	
	GP7	1500	20	1950–1953	550–569	
	GP9	1750	176	1954–1958	200–375	
	GP18	1800	9	1960	376–384	
	FT	1350	22 A, 22 B	1944	5400ABCD–5410ABCD	Delivered as 6000ABCD–6010ABCD
	F3	1500	25 A 24 B	1947–1948	6000A-6004C, 6005B-6006C, 6500A-6509C, 6005A-6006D, 6051A-6052A, 6503C-6506C	6000s are freight, 6500s are passenger
	F7	1500	45 A 34 B	1947–1952	6007A-6012D, 6007B-6012B, 6013D-6018D, 6013C-6018C, 6019D-6020D, 6019C-6020C, 6050B, 6500C, 6501C-6502C, 6507C-6508C, 6509C-6512C, 6510B-6512B, 6513C, 6513B, 6550B, 6551B-6553B,	6000s are freight, 6500s are passenger
	FP7	1500	2	1952	6600–6601	Used on St. Paul to Winnipeg passenger train
	F9	1750	39 A 32 B	1949–1956	6700A, 6700B, 6700C, 6701C, 6701B, 6702A-6704A, 6702B-6703B, 6702C, 6703A-6705A, 6703C, 6704B-6709B, 6704C, 6705C, 6706A, 6706C, 6707A, 6707C, 6710B, 7000D-7001D, 7000C-7001C, 7002D-7006D, 7002C-7006C, 7007D, 7007C, 7008D-7009D, 7008C-7009C, 7010D-7014D, 7010C-7014C, 7050A, 7051A-7051A	6700s are passenger, 7000s are freight. 7003D is preserved at the Oklahoma Railway Museum in Oklahoma City, lettered as Frisco 814. 7012A donated to Western Forest Industries Museum / Mt Rainier Scenic RR in Mineral, WA.
	SD45	3600	30	1966–1968	3600–3629	20 more on order at merger into Burlington Northern

=== General Electric ===
Image	Model	hp	Quantity	Built	Road numbers	Notes
	44-Ton	380	1	1946	98	South Tacoma shops switcher
	44-Ton	400	1	1943	99	Ordered by NP subsidiary Duluth Union Depot and Transfer; temporarily delivered to NP while DUDT resolved labor issues, then transferred to them as No. 5
	U-25C	2500	30	1964–1965	2500–2529	
	U-28C	2800	12	1966	2800–2811	
	U-33C	3300	10	1969	3300–3309	
