= Railroad and Transportation Museum of El Paso =

Coordinates: 31.7564°N 106.4927°W

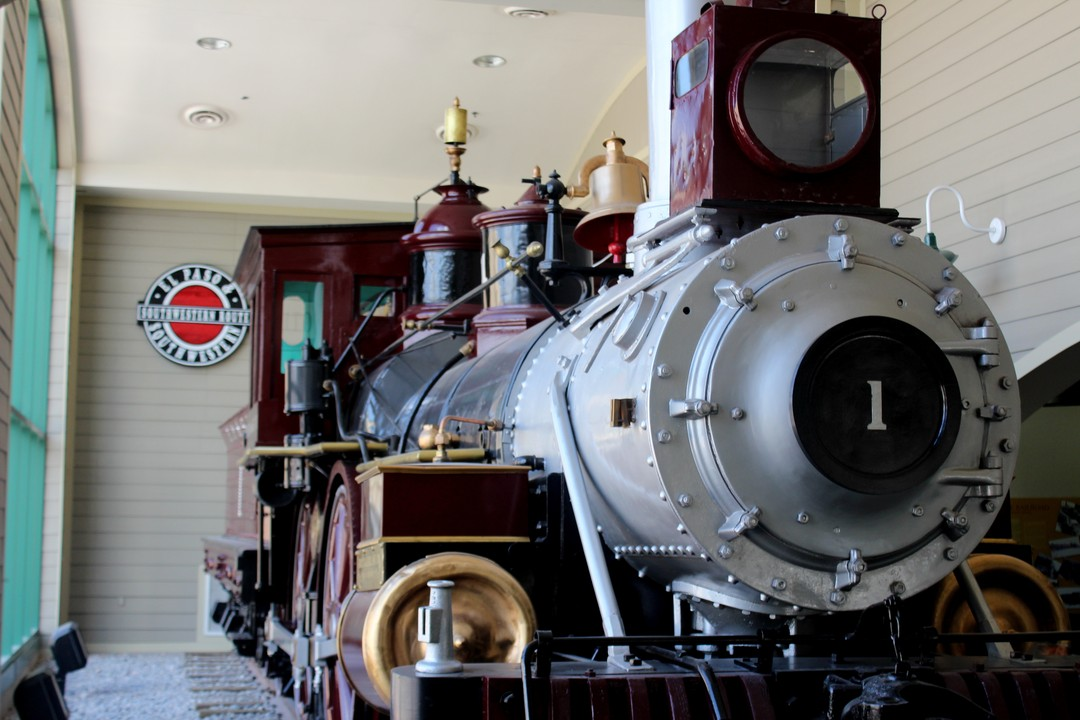
- The Locomotive No. 1 exhibit
- Established: 2006
- Location: West San Antonio and Durango, El Paso, TX
- Type: Railroad museum
- Website: http://www.trainweb.org/

Railroad and Transportation Museum of El Paso is a railroad museum in El Paso, Texas, United States.

== Facilities ==
The museum is operating an exhibit adjacent to historic 1857 locomotive No.1 of the El Paso & Southwestern located in the Union Plaza Transit Terminal, just south of the Civic Center. Displays demonstrate how transportation enhanced the development of business and industry in this region. In addition to an education program, the museum will maintain a library, a study center and an oral history collection.

== Associates and supporters of the museum ==
- Southwest Chapter, Railway & Locomotive Historical Society
- Railroad Model and Historical Association of El Paso
- El Paso & Southwestern Modular Railroad Association
- Paso Del Norte Streetcar Preservation Society
- Grand International Auxiliary to the Brotherhood of Locomotive Engineers
- National Association of Retired and Veteran Railway Employees
- El Paso County Historical Society

== See also ==
- El Paso, Texas
- El Paso & Southwestern Railroad No. 1
