= El Paso & Southwestern Railroad No. 1 =

El Paso & Southwestern Railroad 1
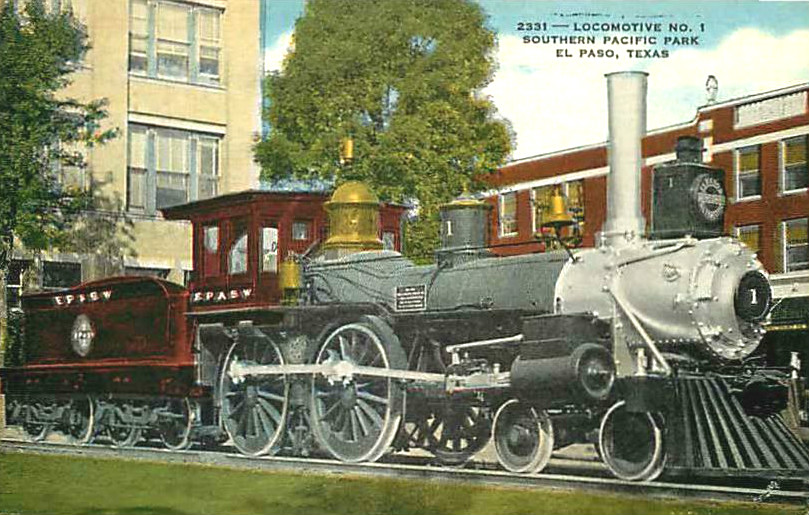
- El Paso & Southwestern Railroad No. 1
Type and origin
- Power type: Steam
- Builder: Breese, Kneeland, and Company
- Serial number: 73
- Build date: May 1857
Specifications
- Configuration
  - Whyte: 4-4-0
- Gauge: 4 ft 8 1/2 in (1,435 mm)
- Driver dia.: 64 in (1.626 m)
- Adhesive weight: 67,170 lb (30.47 tonnes)
- Loco weight: 104,170 lb (47.25 tonnes)
- Fuel type: New: Wood; Now: Coal
- Boiler pressure: 110 psi (0.76 MPa)
- Cylinders: Two, outside
- Cylinder size: 15 in × 22 in (381 mm × 559 mm)
- Valve gear: Stephenson
Performance figures
- Tractive effort: 7,260 lbf (32.3 kN)
Career
- Operators: Milwaukee & Mississippi Railroad; Chicago, Milwaukee & St. Paul Railroad; El Paso and Southwestern Railroad
- Numbers: M&M/M&PdC 40; M&StP/CM&StP 111; A&SE/EP&SW 1
- Retired: 1903
- Restored: 2002 (cosmetically)
- Current owner: University of Texas at El Paso
- Disposition: On static display

El Paso & Southwestern Railroad 1 is a 4-4-0 "American" type steam locomotive, preserved in El Paso, Texas. The engine was built in 1857 by Breese, Kneeland, and Company of Jersey City, New Jersey, and is the only locomotive built by that firm still in existence.

== History ==
=== Revenue service ===
It was a wood burner built for the Milwaukee & Mississippi Railroad Company in 1857 as their No. 40 and named Spring Green. The Milwaukee & Mississippi became the Milwaukee & Prairie du Chien Railway Company in 1861. The locomotive was renumbered 111 when the M&PdC was sold to the Milwaukee & St Paul Railroad in 1867; the railroad renaming itself The Chicago, Milwaukee & St. Paul Railroad in 1874.

In 1889, the locomotive was sold to the Arizona and Southeastern Railroad Company, as their No. 1, later becoming the El Paso and Southwestern Railroad. It is likely to have been converted to coal burning during this time, thus receiving its current appearance with a straight stack and extended smokebox. EP&SW No. 1 was used to move mine and mill supplies and products when it arrived here in 1902. As El Paso became one of the great rail hubs of the west, timber was brought from Cloudcroft and coal from Dawson, New Mexico.

=== Preservation ===
In 1903, it was retired, and around 1909, Locomotive No. 1 was overhauled, painted, and put on display in Downtown El Paso at the intersection of Stanton and Franklin streets. In 1939, the engine was used in the film Let Freedom Ring, starring Nelson Eddy and Virginia Bruce.

In 1960, Southern Pacific Railroad donated it to the University of Texas at El Paso who displayed it near the Centennial Museum and Chihuahuan Desert Gardens. The bell clapper was removed because students would ring it to disturb the slumber of residents in nearby dorms. In 1968, El Paso Historical Society and the Junior Chamber of Commerce raised money to build a shelter to protect this important national treasure from the elements.

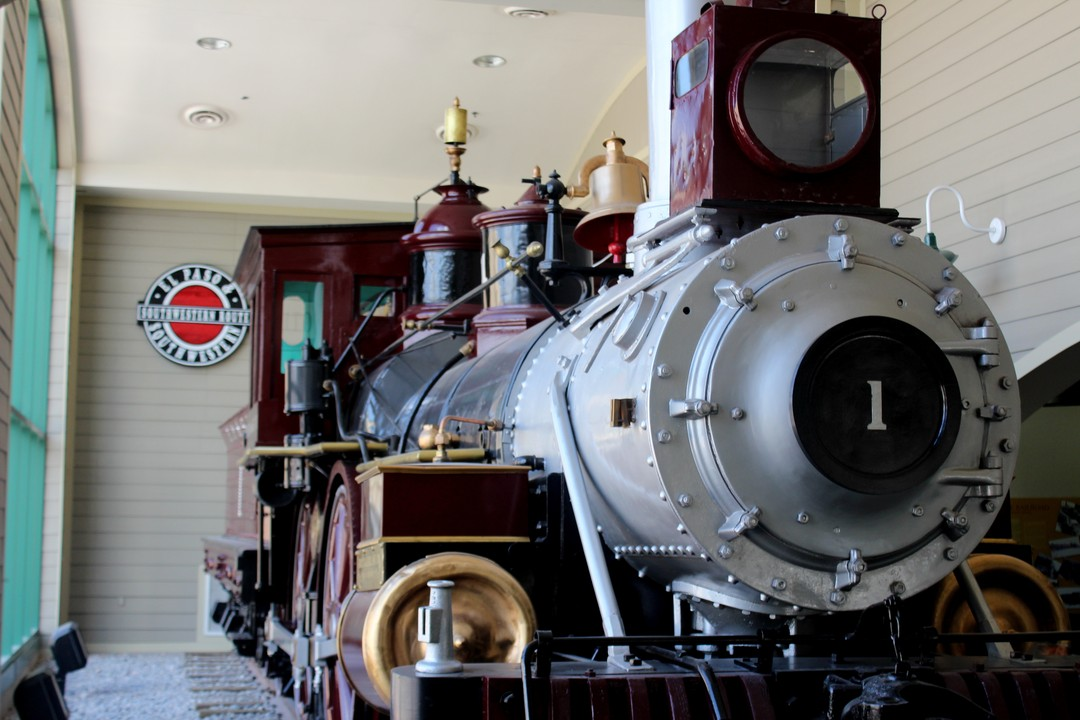
In El Paso

In October 1999, the engine was officially recognized as a National Trust for Historic Preservation Save America’s Treasures project. In 2001 more than $1.1 million of Texas State Transportation Commission and local matching funds were allocated for the removal and restoration of the locomotive. The engine was removed from the Centennial Museum in 2002, and placed in a warehouse where it was cosmetically restored. As part of the restoration work, the bell clapper was returned on June 20, 2002, and reinstalled. The restored engine was placed in the Railroad and Transportation Museum of El Paso in 2003.

== See also ==
- Railroad and Transportation Museum of El Paso
