= GE U28CG =

US Diesel-electric locomotive

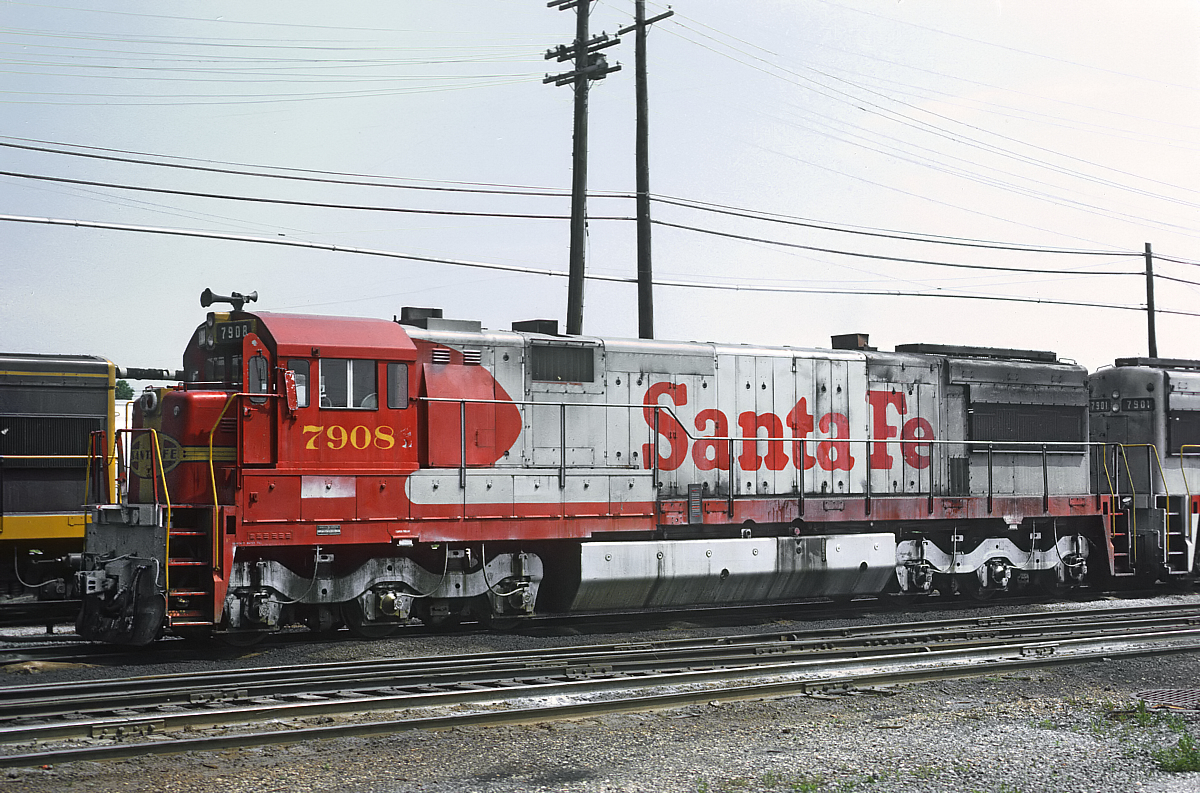
- Santa Fe No. 7908, a GE U28CG, in freight service at Fort Madison, Iowa, in 1971
Type and origin
- Power type: Diesel-electric
- Builder: GE Transportation Systems
- Model: U28CG
- Build date: July 1966–August 1966
- Total produced: 10
Specifications
- Configuration
  - AAR: C-C
- Gauge: 4 ft 8 1/2 in (1,435 mm)
- Wheel diameter: 40 in (1,000 mm)
- Minimum curve: 29°
- Wheelbase: 51 ft 4 in (15,650 mm)
- Pivot centres: 38 ft 4 in (11,680 mm)
- Length: 64 ft 6 in (19,660 mm)
- Width: 9 ft 11 in (3,020 mm)
- Height: 15 ft 4 in (4,670 mm)
- Loco weight: 395,500 lb (179,400 kg)
- Fuel type: Diesel
- Fuel capacity: 2,200 US gal (8,300 L; 1,800 imp gal)
- Lubricant cap.: 355 US gal (1,340 L; 296 imp gal)
- Coolant cap.: 800 US gal (3,000 L; 670 imp gal)
- Sandbox cap.: 48 ft^{3} (1.4 m^{3})
- Prime mover: GE FDL-16
- RPM
  - RPM low idle: 650
  - Maximum RPM: 1050
- Generator: Main: GT598; Auxilary: GY27
- Traction motors: GE-752 (6)
- Cylinder size: 9.0 in (230 mm) × 10.5 in (270 mm)
- Gear ratio: 77:26
- MU working: Yes
- Train heating: 800 psi (5,500 kPa) Steam generator
- Loco brake: Westinghouse 26L (Air Brake)
- Train brakes: Westinghouse 26L (Air Brake)
Performance figures
- Maximum speed: 93 mph (150 km/h)
- Power output: 2,800 hp (2,100 kW)
- Tractive effort
  - Starting: 98,875 lbf (44,849 kgf) @ 25%
  - Continuous: 75,000 lbf (34,000 kgf) @ 10.7 mph (17.2 km/h)
Career
- Operators: Atchison, Topeka and Santa Fe Railway
- Numbers: 350 - 359, later renumbered to 7900 - 7909
- Nicknames: The Forgotten U Boat
- Locale: United States
- Withdrawn: September 22, 1980
- Disposition: All scrapped

The GE U28CG was a dual-service diesel-electric locomotive produced in 1966 by GE Transportation Systems and derived from their freight-hauling U28C design. The sole customer was the Atchison, Topeka and Santa Fe Railway, which ordered ten early that year for delivery in July and August.

By that date, no North American locomotive builder cataloged a dedicated passenger-locomotive design; instead, all that was available were steam-generator equipped versions of freight road switcher locomotive designs. The railroad's F units, the backbone of its passenger fleet, were old and increasingly troublesome, and the Santa Fe needed to get some replacements in short order. GE's waiting list was shorter, and GE offered better trade-in deals for old Alcos the road wanted to get rid of.

The ten units were delivered in Santa Fe's trademark Warbonnet silver and red paint scheme, but not identical in all details to previous applications. The yellow and black separation lines between the red and silver were absent, and the bodyside 'Santa Fe' lettering was large, billboard-style, in a Cooper Black typeface, instead of the smaller black serif all-caps version previously used. (That style would later be resurrected in 1989). Instead of silver trucks, frame and tanks, they were black from the factory — and were repainted silver later. The locomotives were numbered in the 3-digit passenger series, with road numbers 350–359.

Since the GE "U-boat" design had provision for a train-heating steam generator between the cab and the engine compartment, the U28CG's dimensions were identical to the U28C. There was a bulge in the hood on the left-hand side to accommodate the steam generator, which was a Vapor-Clarkson unit, skid-mounted for easy repair and replacement. An air vent and exhaust protruded from the roof, and the tanks under the locomotive were split between fuel and water with an internal division and two refilling spouts.

Further Santa Fe passenger locomotives were custom-ordered cowl units from both GE (the U30CG) and GM-EMD (the FP45). After the derailment of a U30CG on February 9, 1969, however, both GE designs were suspect; after a series of tests, the Santa Fe withdrew them from passenger service and reassigned them to freight duties. Shortly afterward, the units were renumbered into the freight series as 7900–7909 and assigned to the road's Argentine shops in Kansas. The ten locomotives were repainted into freight colors over time, the early repaints into Santa Fe's old blue and yellow freight scheme, the later repaints into blue and yellow Warbonnet. With a split water and fuel underbody tank, the U28CGs had a short range, and were used on secondary trains until the tanks were modified to carry fuel only. The steam generators were removed, and on some units the openings in the roof were closed up. Gearing was changed from 77:26 passenger gearing to 74:18 for freight service, which was the same as Santa Fe's U33Cs and U36Cs.

During the 1970s, the U28CGs and U30CGs were commonly seen on Colorado freight service and other secondary assignments. They were withdrawn on September 22, 1980 and traded in to GE for new B36-7 locomotives. All were scrapped soon after the trade in.
