= Bachtold Building-Interurban Depot =

Historic building in Walla Walla, Washington

- Bachtold Building - Interurban Depot
- U.S. National Register of Historic Places
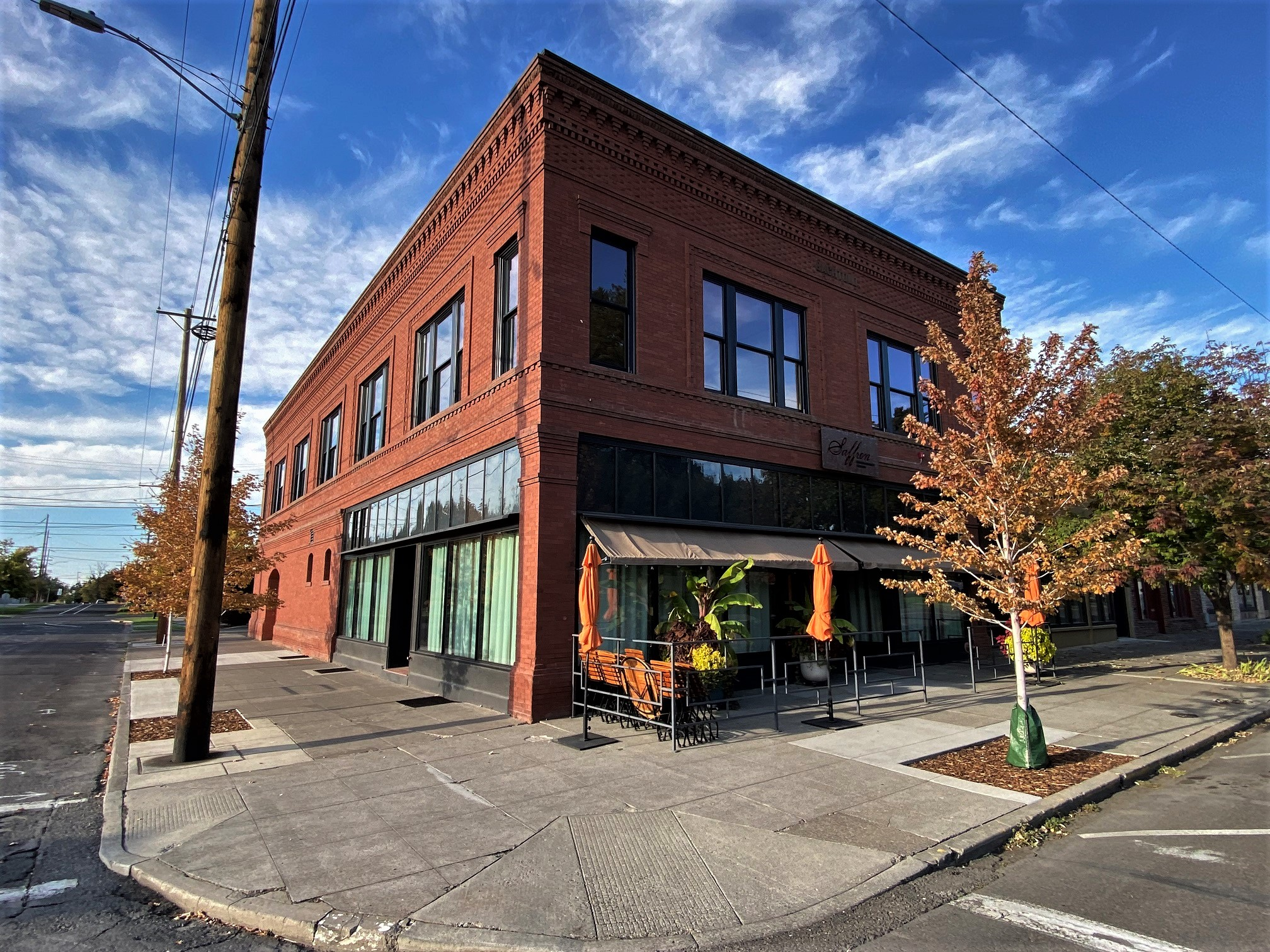
- Bachtold Building

- Location within Washington (state)
- Location: 330 W. Main St. Walla Walla, Washington
- Coordinates: 46°3′53″N 118°20′39″W
- Built: Completed 1910
- Architectural style: Sullivanesque
- NRHP reference No.: 100004346
- Added to NRHP: August 27, 2019

The Bachtold Building-Interurban Depot is a Sullivanesque style historic building located in Walla Walla, Washington, United States completed in 1901.

== History ==
=== Alfred Bachtold (1870–1919) ===
Born in a German-speaking part of Switzerland, Bachtold moved to South Dakota at the age of 12 with his family. Initially, he worked as a farm hand before moving to Wisconsin, opening up a plumbing business. In 1892, Bachtold moved to Walla Walla, eventually reconnecting with his brother, John, who now owned the Elk Saloon. In 1897, now aged 27, he married Maria “Mary” A Ganswig, having 5 children together. During this time, he was in the business of wire fence manufacturing.

That year, Bachtold met Charles Ackermann, who had also immigrated to the United States from Switzerland, and formed their wholesale wine and liquor business, Bachtold and Ackermann. Ackermann had previously run a wine business in California, and they quickly became one of the largest liquor wholesalers in the state. The magazine Up-to-the-Times mentioned they were "practically the only wholesale liquor dealers doing business in the Inland Empire country between Portland and Spokane" As their business grew, Bachtold diversified his assets, investing in property. In 1906, he started the Inland Empire Mining & Million Company along with his brother and Albert Niebengall. By 1920, stock for the company was valued at $1.5 million.

=== Prohibition ===
During the 1910s, the prohibition movement was rapidly gaining strength in Washington, directly targeting businesses like Bachtold and Ackermann. On November 3, 1914, influenced by Anti-Saloon League lobbyists, Washington voters approved the prohibition of liquor manufacture and sale, but not consumption. Many towns, including Walla Walla, had voted against the measure, without success. subsequently, after 17 years in business, Bachtold and Ackermann closed their doors.

=== Death ===
Bachtold died on October 17, 1919, at the age of 49. After his death, his wife moved to Los Angeles until her death. Her body was then returned to Walla Walla, where she was buried beside her husband.

== Architecture ==
The building was reportedly built at the cost of $25,000, allowing more passengers of the Walla Walla Valley Traction Company to commute from Milton Freewater to Walla Walla. The building included a heated waiting room and extra restrooms.

The design of the building is unusual for a depot, integrating the function of a railroad depot and commercial building in one. Its design is similar to other brick commercial buildings of the time, with the addition of three large openings on the rear of the structure.

== See also ==
- Walla Walla Valley Traction Company Car Barn
- National Register of Historic Places listings in Walla Walla County, Washington
- National Register of Historic Places
- Louis Sullivan
