= Walla Walla Valley Railway =

Railroad in Oregon and Washington (state)

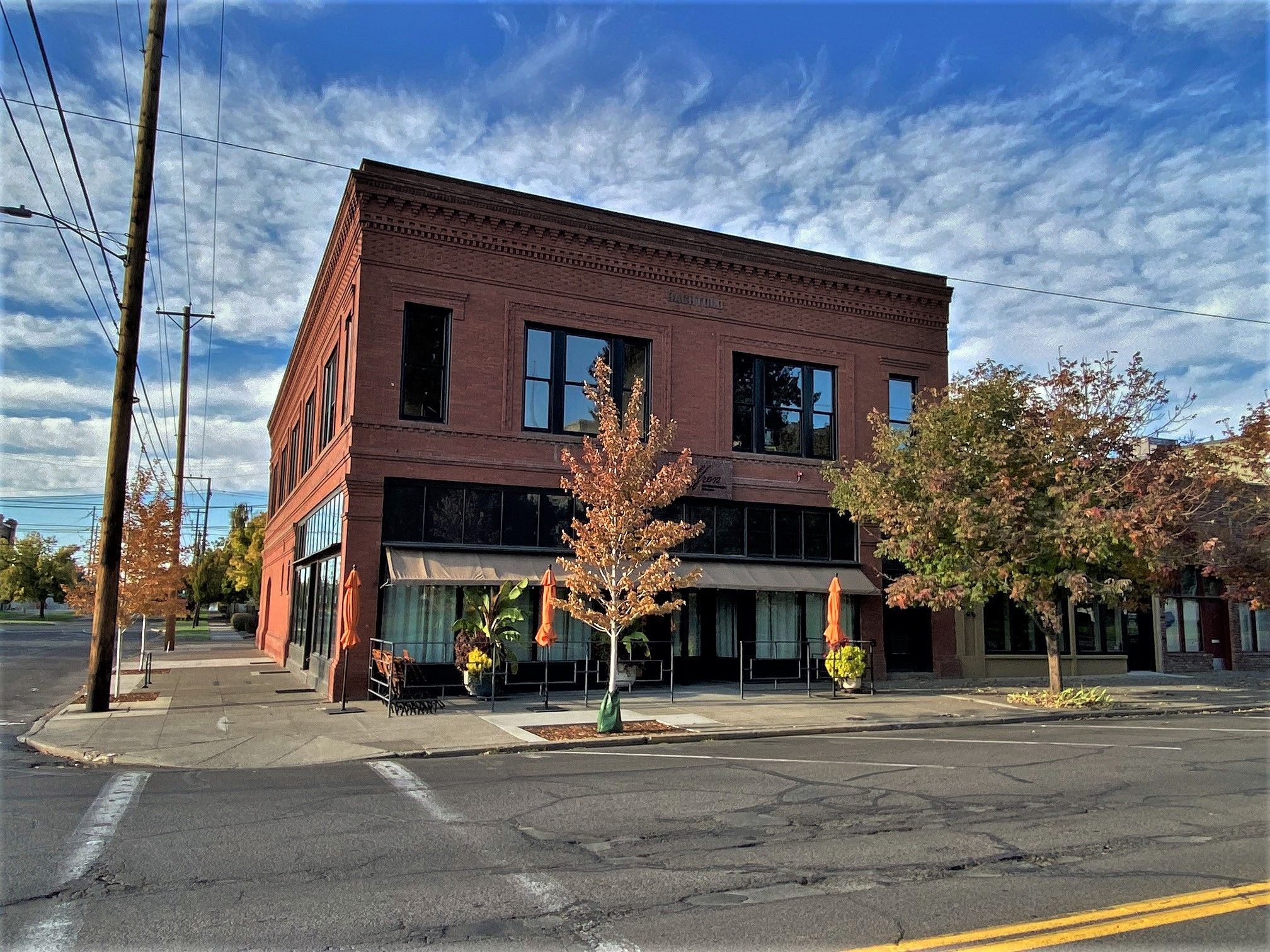
The Bachtold Building was the company's interurban terminal in Walla Walla. The city streetcar lines converged at East Main and South Second.

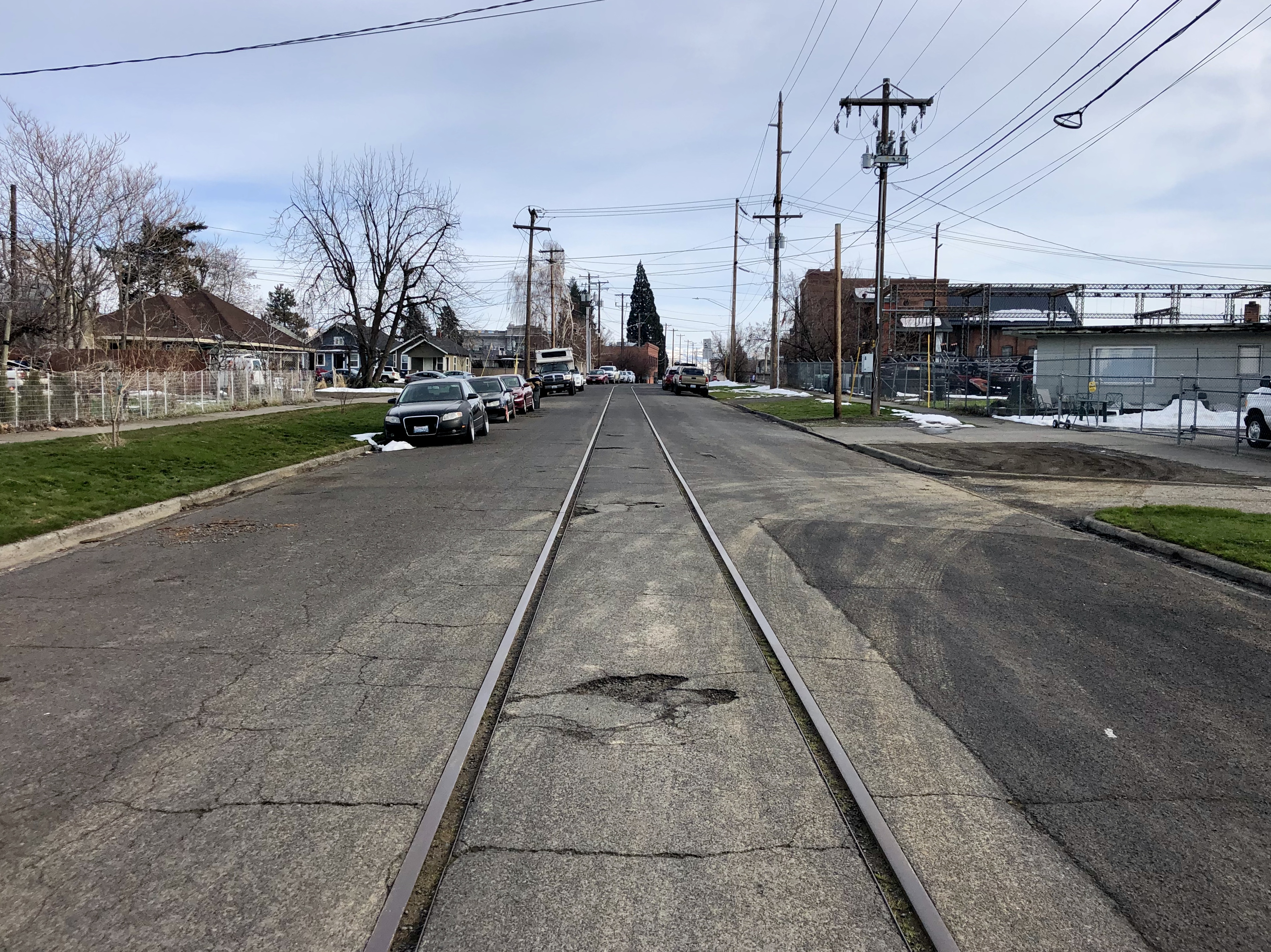
Streetcar tracks, seen in 2019

The Walla Walla Valley Railway was an interurban and streetcar railway in Walla Walla, Washington. Its interurban line ran between Walla Walla and Milton, Oregon, with freight branches to Baker-Langdon and Umapine. Initially operated as an electric railway, passenger operations ended after 1931 and it was converted to diesel trains, eventually coming under control of the Burlington Northern Railway before being abandoned in 1985.

Begun as the Walla Walla Valley Traction Company, its first cars operated on September 11, 1906. Interurban service to Milton began on April 16, 1907. The local East Walla Walla Line and the Prospect Heights Line both began operations in 1908.

A series of acquisitions and mergers brought the company under the control of the Northwest Gas and Electric Company, and then the Northwestern Corporation of Philadelphia. Finally in 1910 the traction operations in eastern Oregon were split off, with the Walla Walla Valley Traction properties becoming the Walla Walla Valley Railway under ownership of Pacific Power and Light.

The East Walla Walla Line and the Prospect Heights Line both ceased running in 1920 and the City Park line was discontinued at the end of 1926. when the franchise rights expired. Interurban services to Oregon ceased after September 2, 1931.

The railway was reclassified as a short-line class II railway in 1950, the year that electric operations ended and were replaced with diesel trains. The company was absorbed as an operating subsidiary of the Burlington Northern Railway in 1970. Freight operations continued until 1985 when the line was finally abandoned.

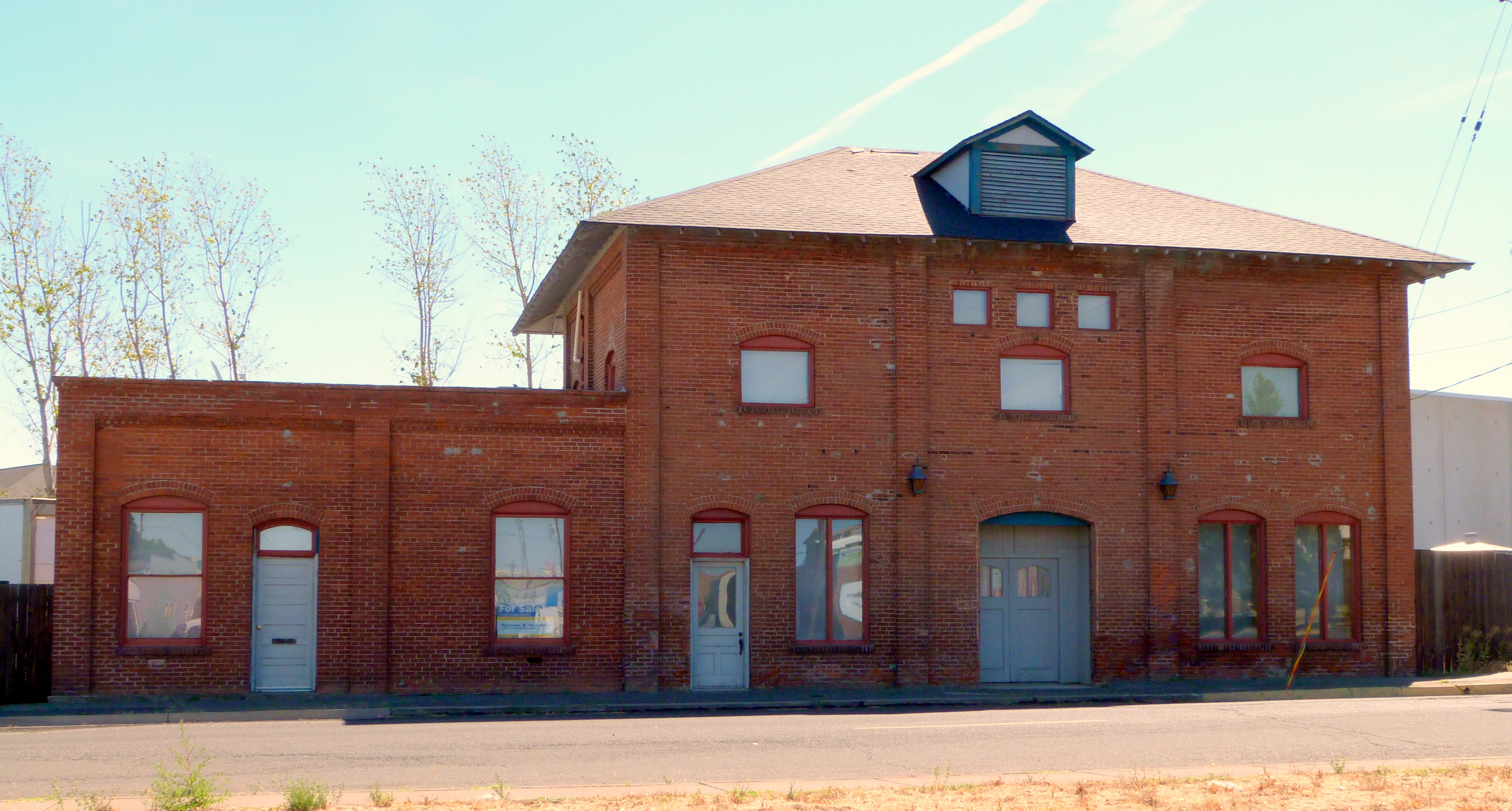
The passenger station and powerhouse in Milton, Oregon

== See also ==
- Structures listed on the National Register of Historic Places:
  - Walla Walla Valley Traction Company Car Barn
  - Bachtold Building-Interurban Depot
  - Walla Walla Valley Traction Company Passenger Station and Powerhouse in Milton-Freewater, Oregon
