= New York Locomotive Works =

Builder of steam locomotive engines

Breese, Kneeland, and Company was a nineteenth-century builder of steam locomotive engines located at Jersey City, New Jersey. Initially styled the New York Locomotive Works, the company was active under various ownerships in building steam locomotives from 1853 until 1873. The original proprietors were Charles Kneeland, William Hamilton and S. Breese. Encrease Personette Gould (1822-1876), usually known as E. P. Gould, a well known mechanic and formerly the mechanical superintendent of the Hudson River Railroad was the first shop foreman and designer.

== Locomotives ==
The initial products were noted for their up to the minute designs and were well received. The first two locomotives went to the Hudson River Railroad in 1853. Named the Superior and the Baltic they were very large for their time, weighing 29 tons and were fitted with 78 inch driving wheels. They also featured advanced features such as straight top boilers, front end throttles and more heating surface than most contemporary locomotives.

== Reorganizations ==
Although the company seemingly was off to a good start the "iniquitous conduct of certain western railroad managers... buying engines on credit while they knew their companies were hopelessly insolvent..." doomed the enterprise and the financial collapse of 1857 put the company in the hands of its creditors.

The company was reorganized as the Jersey City Locomotive Works with William Hamilton in charge, but the company again failed in 1865. James McHenry then leased the shop to build over 100 locomotives for the broad gauge Atlantic and Great Western Railroad which apparently was unable to supply its needs through commercial builders.

When McHenry's contract concluded, the works were leased to Nathaniel McKay, brother of Donald McKay, of clipper ship fame, formerly associated with locomotive builder McKay and Aldus. McKay Iron Works built general machinery, including a few locomotives, until the works closed for good in 1872.

== Production ==
Total locomotive production at Jersey City is estimated at about 300 under all managements. One locomotive, El Paso & Southwestern Railroad No. 1 (formerly Milwaukee & Mississippi Railroad number 40), built by Breese Kneeland, is preserved at the Centennial Museum, University of Texas, El Paso.

== See also ==
- Rome Locomotive Works, another company trading as New York Locomotive Works
