= GE U28C =

Model of American diesel locomotive

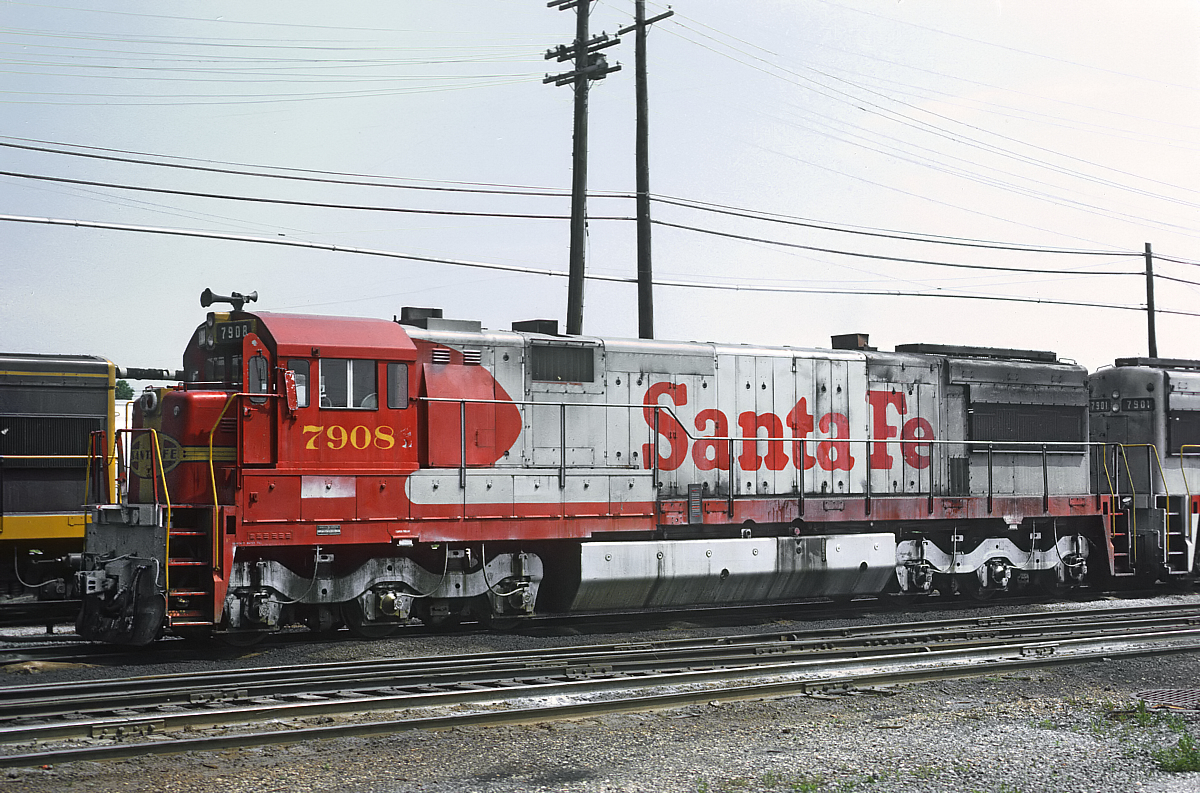
- Santa Fe No. 7908, a GE U28CG, in freight service at Fort Madison, Iowa in 1971
Type and origin
- Power type: Diesel
- Builder: GE Transportation Systems
- Model: U28C
- Build date: February 1966 – November 1966
- Total produced: 71
Specifications
- Configuration
  - AAR: C-C
- Gauge: 4 ft 8 1/2 in (1,435 mm)
- Length: 64 feet 4 inches (19.61 m) Phase I or 67 feet 3 inches (20.50 m) Phase II
- Fuel capacity: 3500 gallons Phase I or 4000 gallons Phase II
- Prime mover: GE FDL-16
- Alternator: GTA 9 Phase II (PRR units)
- Generator: GT 598 Phase I and Phase II
- Cylinders: 16
Performance figures
- Power output: 2,800 hp (2,090 kW)
Career
- Disposition: 1 preserved, remainder scrapped

The U28C locomotive was developed by General Electric from the U25C, with a slight increase in power of 300 hp (224 kW). A passenger-hauling variant, the U28CG, was also produced for the Atchison, Topeka and Santa Fe Railway.

== Development ==
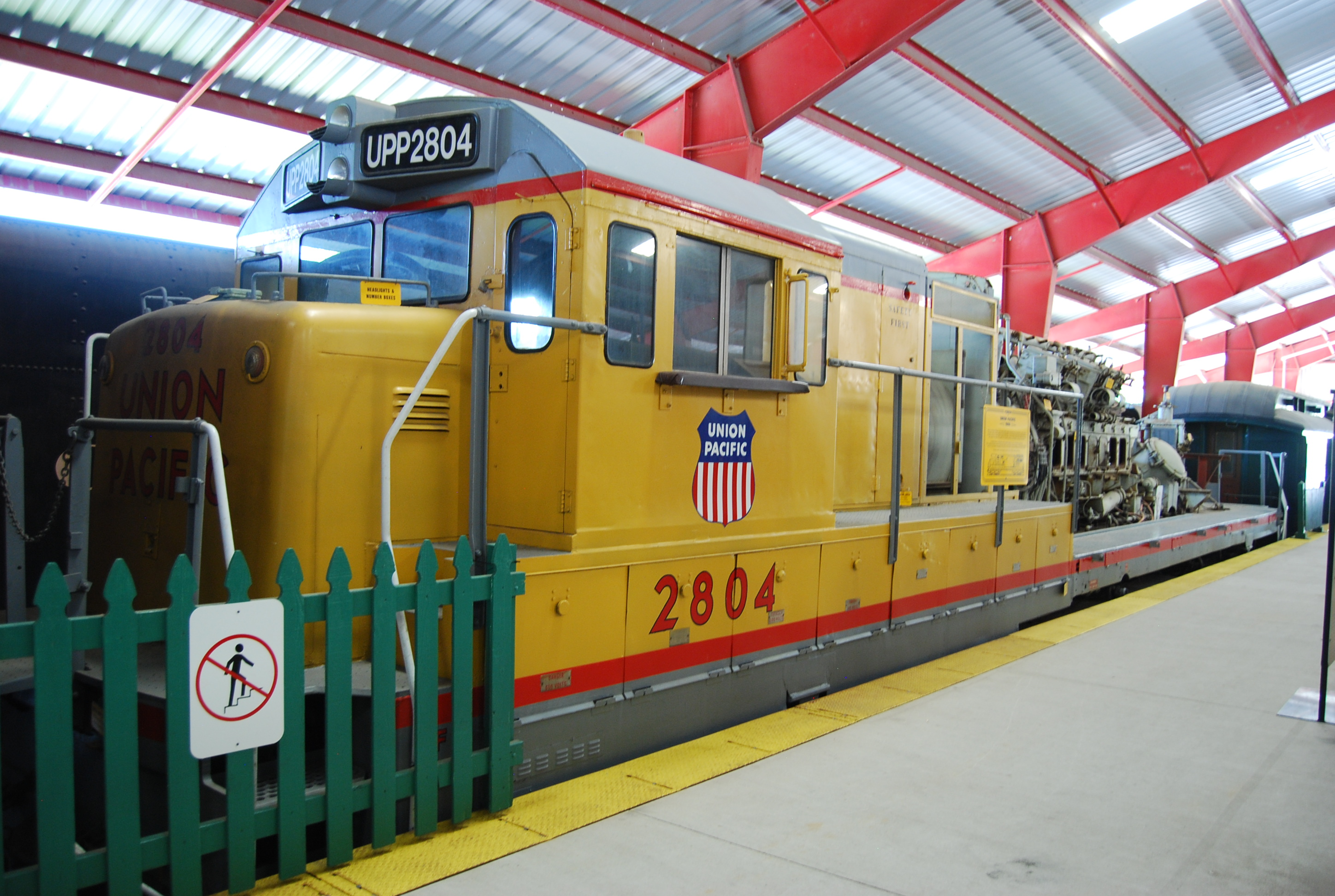
Union Pacific 2804 on display at the National Museum of Transportation

General Electric built ten uprated U25Cs in 1965. Facing the competitive pressure of the second generation horsepower race, GE built these units with increased horsepower. The competitive 2750 horsepower Alco C628 had more horsepower and the 3000 horsepower Alco C630 was announced in July 1965. General Motors had the 3000 horsepower EMD SD40 demonstrators testing on several railroads. The increase in unit horsepower was happening that year. The uprated units were built for three railroads that were already operating the U25C. The first uprated units were built for the Northern Pacific between May and July 1965. These were NP #2518-2520 and were rated at 2750 horsepower. Three more uprated U25Cs were built as Atlantic Coast Line #3011-3013 in December 1965. The ACL units were rated at 2800 horsepower. The last four uprated U25Cs were rated at 2800 horsepower and were built for the Pennsylvania Railroad in December 1965. These were PRR #6516-6519. Six additional PRR U25Cs were uprated to 2800 horsepower: 6500–6503, 6510–6511. In early 1966 General Electric began offering the 2800 horsepower U28C. A total of 28 look-a-like U28Cs were built between February 1966 and July 1966 as Chicago Burlington and Quincy #562-577 and Northern Pacific #2800-2811. These early Phase I U28Cs shared the 64 foot 4 inch frame that was standard with the predecessor U25C.

A drawing of the proposed longer frame U28C is in the November 1965 issue of Trains Magazine. Starting in May 1966 GE began producing the U28C on a longer frame. The new length for these U28Cs was 67 feet 3 inches. These are the 43 Phase II units built for Louisville and Nashville, Pennsylvania, Southern Pacific and Union Pacific. The Phase II units used either the General Electric GT 598 Generator or the GTA 9 Alternator. The 10 Santa Fe U28CGs were also built on this longer frame. Starting in November 1966 and through mid 1967 GE built 24 look a like Phase I U30Cs that used the same carbody as the Phase II U28Cs.

== Original owners ==
GE produced 71 U28C locomotives, not including ten U28CG passenger variants for the Santa Fe:

Image	Railroad	Quantity	Road numbers	Notes
	Chicago, Burlington and Quincy Railroad	16	562–577	to Burlington Northern 5650–5665, U25C-style carbody
	Louisville and Nashville Railroad	8	1526–1533	Late-style carbody
	Northern Pacific Railway	12	2800–2811	to Burlington Northern 5666–5677, U25C-style carbody
	Pennsylvania Railroad	15	6520–6534	Late-style carbody
	Southern Pacific Railroad	10	7150–7159	Late-style carbody
	Union Pacific Railroad	10	2800–2809	Late-style carbody

== Preservation ==
Union Pacific No. 2804 is preserved at the National Museum of Transportation in St. Louis, Missouri. The rear of the locomotive has been cutaway to show the inner workings of a diesel locomotive.
