= Rome Locomotive Works =

19th century locomotive manufacturer

The New York Locomotive Works, sometimes known as the Rome Locomotive Works, was a nineteenth-century builder of steam locomotive engines located at Rome, New York. The company was active under various ownerships in building steam locomotives from 1882 until 1911. The New York Locomotive Works should not be confused with the earlier Breese, Kneeland, and Company which traded under the same name in the 1850s. The company was organized in 1881 with T. G Noch, a prominent local businessman as president. J. A. Durgan, a well known designer of steam locomotives was appointed superintendent, a position he had previously held at the Rhode Island Locomotive Works. The company was an instant success, as railroads were expanding a feverish pace. NYLW offered a robust, no frills locomotive and was well connected with banking interests that allowed sales along the "Car Trust Plan" with payments out to ten years.

== Reorganizations ==
Business collapsed suddenly after the death of President Noch in 1890 and the financial panic of the early 1890s dried up new orders. The company shut down in June 1891 and was reorganized as the Rome Locomotive and Machine Company. The new company announced its focus would be rebuilding steam machinery and general shop work. Some compressed air locomotives were constructed by the new company but only two new steam locomotives were built after the reorganization, the last in 1911. RL&MC merged into the Rome Manufacturing Company in 1916. Rome Manufacturing built trolley cars, French designed automobiles and a line of heavy construction equipment including road graders and continued rebuilding steam locomotives into the 1920s.

== Production ==
Rome built 695 steam locomotives in a decade, a significant number in a highly competitive field, the seventeenth largest total among 19th century North American locomotive builders. Three NYLW locomotives survive. Northern Pacific 4-4-0 684 was built in 1884 and is preserved at Fargo, ND.
