= Walla Walla Valley Traction Company Car Barn =

- U.S. National Register of Historic Places
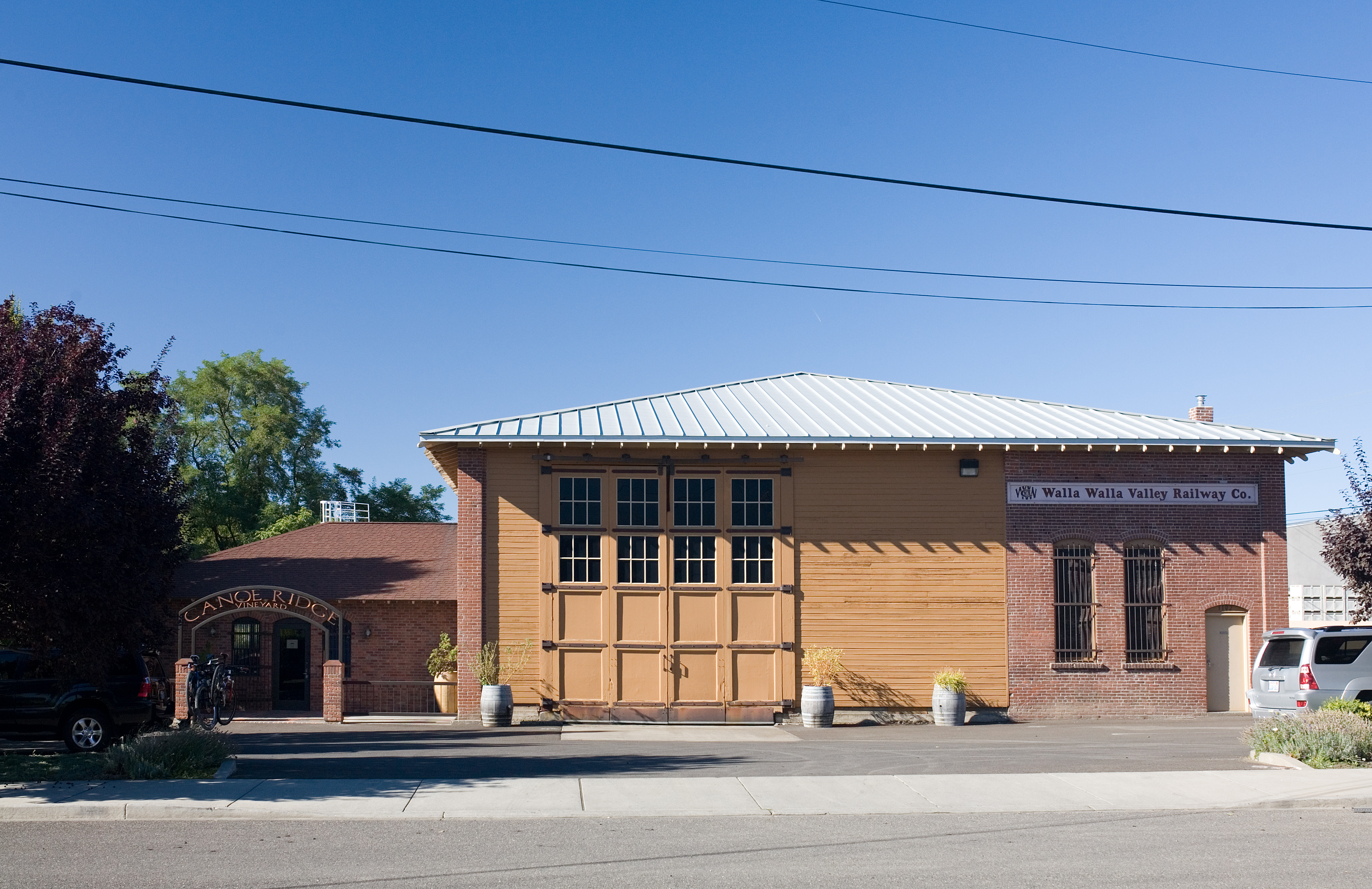

- Location within Washington (state) Location within the United States
- Location: 1102 W. Cherry, Walla Walla, Washington
- Coordinates: 46°04′04″N 118°21′24″W
- Area: less than one acre
- Built: 1906
- NRHP reference No.: 89002097
- Added to NRHP: December 7, 1989

The Walla Walla Valley Traction Company Car Barn, at 1102 W. Cherry in Walla Walla, Washington, was built in 1906. It was listed on the National Register of Historic Places in 1989.

It has also been known as the Walla Walla Valley Traction Company Engine House.

It was originally Walla Walla's streetcar and train facility. Now it is the Canoe Ridge Vineyard's tasting room.

== See also ==
- Bachtold Building-Interurban Depot
