= GE U25C =

Diesel locomotive built by General Electric

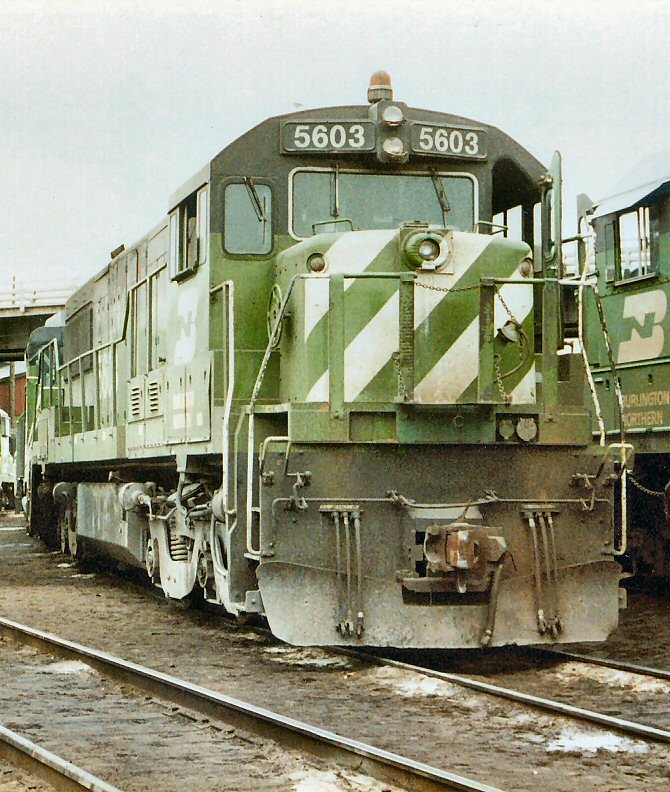
- Burlington Northern Railroad U25C #5603.
Type and origin
- Power type: Diesel-electric
- Builder: GE Transportation Systems
- Model: U25C
- Build date: September 1963 – December 1965
- Total produced: 113
Specifications
- Configuration
  - AAR: C-C
- Gauge: 4 ft 8 1/2 in (1,435 mm)
- Length: 64' 6"
- Prime mover: GE FDL-16
- Generator: GE GT 598
- Traction motors: 6X GE752
- Cylinders: 16
Performance figures
- Power output: 2,500 hp (1,860 kW)
Career
- Locale: United States
- Disposition: LSI 2501 preserved, remainder scrapped

The U25C is a diesel locomotive built by General Electric intended for the United States domestic market. Launched in September 1963, it remained in production until December 1965. It was replaced by the U28C.

== Development ==
The origin of the U25C grew out of the need for six axle locomotives to operate on a 12-mile heavy haul railroad to construct Oroville Dam. The General Electric salesman to Oro Dam Constructors offered essentially a U25B riding on six axle trucks. When the salesman got back to GE's Erie Plant it was discovered that no six axle U25 was available, nor did GE wish to construct a domestic six axle road switcher until the horsepower threshold reached 3000 horsepower. Rather than lose the four unit sale GE quickly began a design of a six axle U25 that relied heavily on the U25B for engineering. The U25C was longer than the U25B by four feet four inches. The extra length was needed to accommodate the improved Trimount trucks. Completed in September 1963 the U25C was the first six axle unit of the second generation of dieselization. Following quickly on the Oro Dam Constructor's order was an order by Atlantic Coast Line for four U25Cs. The ACL also ordered the first four Alco C628s. Both of these ACL orders were delivered in December 1963.

== Phases ==
The following are normally identified as U25C phases:

=== Phase I ===
Phase I units were built from September 1963 to May 1964. These units featured a 2900-gallon fuel tank with the air tanks on the ends of the tank. The early U25Cs had louvers on the equipment boxes under the engineer's side of the cab. Oro Dam Constructors #8010-8016 and Atlantic Coast Line #3000-3003 were the only examples.

=== Phase II ===
Phase II units were built from May 1964 to November 1964. These units had a 3500-gallon fuel tank. The air tanks were relocated to inside the carbody behind the cab. Louvers were placed in the long hood behind the cab for ventilation of the air tanks. There were 24 Phase II units. They were built for Northern Pacific #2500-2514, Lake Superior & Ishpeming #2500-2501, and Atlantic Coast Line #3004-3010

=== Phase III ===
Built from April 1965 to July 1966. The Phase III units were the most numerous and included the Upgraded U25Cs. A total of 78 U25Cs were built with this carbody. The Phase III U25C carbody overlapped into early Phase I U28C production. A total of 28 Phase I U28Cs used this same carbody. The Phase III had screened panel openings in the carbody behind the cab. Louvers were eliminated from the left side of the carbody, but kept on the engineer's side. A rectangular box opening on the roof provided fresh air for ventilation and cooling the air tanks. Pennsylvania and L&N U25Cs also had an extra equipment box and third handrail stanchion on the raised part of the walkway next to the radiator intake. The extra equipment box was for extended range dynamic brake contactors. In later Phase III production screened doors replaced the screen panels behind the engineer's side of the cab. The louvers behind the engineer's side of the cab were also removed in late production Phase III units.

== Original Owners ==
Image	Owner	Quantity	Numbers	Notes
	Atlantic Coast Line Railroad	21	3000–3020	to Seaboard Coast Line Railroad 2100–2120; 19 to Ferrocarriles Nacionales de México
	Chicago, Burlington and Quincy Railroad	12	550–561	to Burlington Northern 5630–5641
	Lake Superior and Ishpeming Railroad	2	2500–2501	
	Louisville and Nashville Railroad	18	1500–1517	1518–1525 ex Oro Dam
	Northern Pacific Railway	30	2500–2529	to Burlington Northern 5600–5629
	Oro Dam Project, California	10	8010–8019	8 later to Louisville and Nashville Railroad 1518–1525, 8010 and 8016 wrecked
	Pennsylvania Railroad	20	6500–6519	to Penn Central 6500–6519; to Conrail 6500–6519; renumbered 6800–6819

== Uprated U25Cs ==
General Electric built ten uprated U25Cs in 1965. Facing the competitive pressure of the second generation horsepower race GE built these units with increased horsepower. The Alco C628 had more horsepower and the Alco C630 was already announced that Summer. General Motors had the EMD SD40 demonstrators working on several railroads. The increase in unit horsepower was happening that year. The uprated units were built for three railroads that were already operating the U25C. The first uprated units were built for the Northern Pacific between May and July 1965. These were NP #2518-2520 and were rated at 2750 horsepower. Three more uprated U25Cs were built as Atlantic Coast Line #3011-3013 in December 1965. The ACL units were rated at 2800 horsepower. The last four uprated U25Cs were rated at 2800 horsepower and were built for the Pennsylvania Railroad in December 1965. These were PRR #6516-6519. Six additional PRR U25Cs were uprated to 2800 horsepower: 6500-6503, 6510-6511. In early 1966 General Electric began offering the 2800 horsepower U28C. A total of 28 look-a-like U28Cs were built between February 1966 and July 1966 as Chicago Burlington and Quincy #562-577 and Northern Pacific #2800-2811.

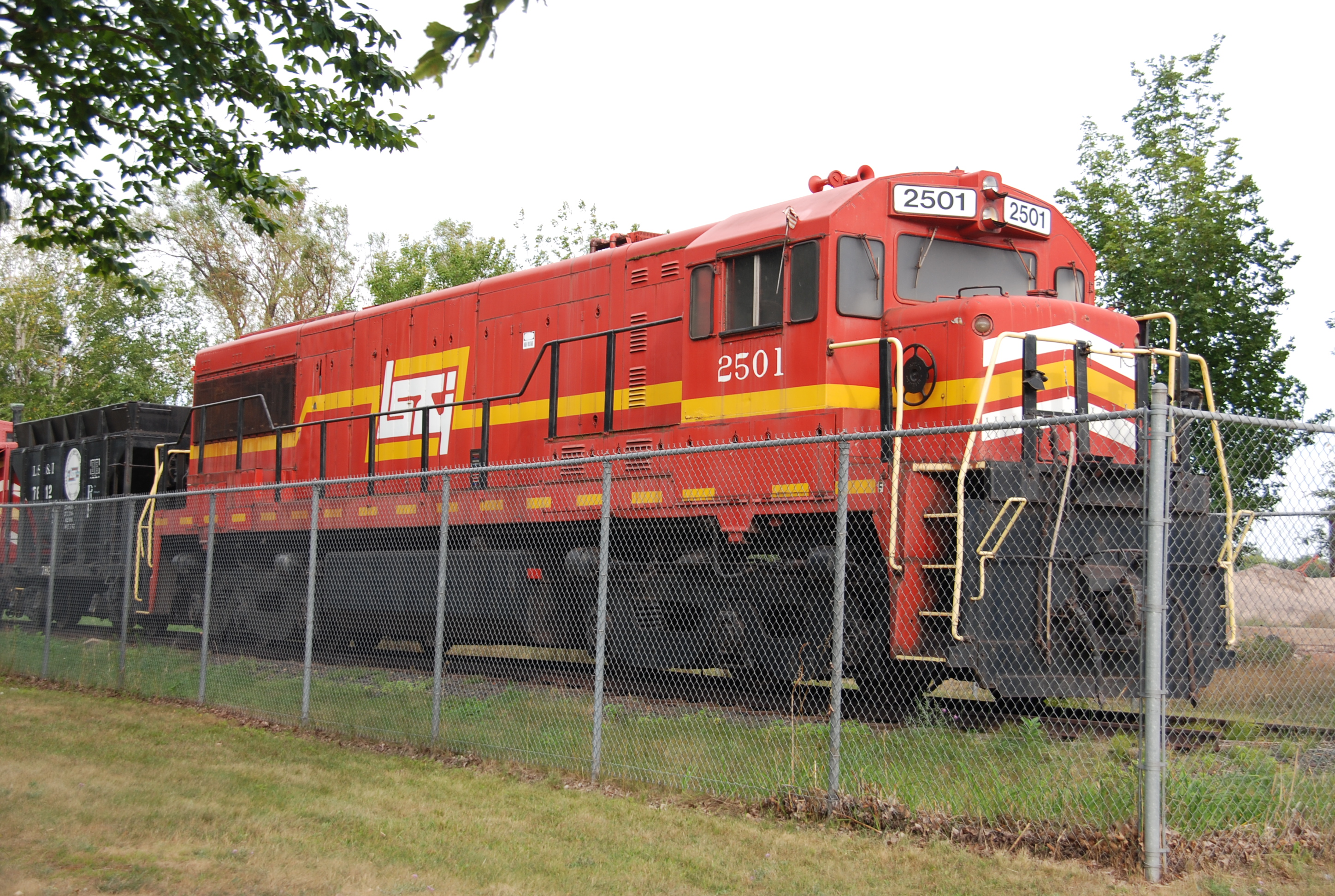

== Preservation ==
- Lake Superior and Ishpeming #2501 is displayed in Marquette, Michigan. It is the only known surviving U25C.
