= Pennsylvania Railroad 460 =

Preserved PRR E6s class steam locomotive

Coordinates: 39°58′56″N 76°9′40″W

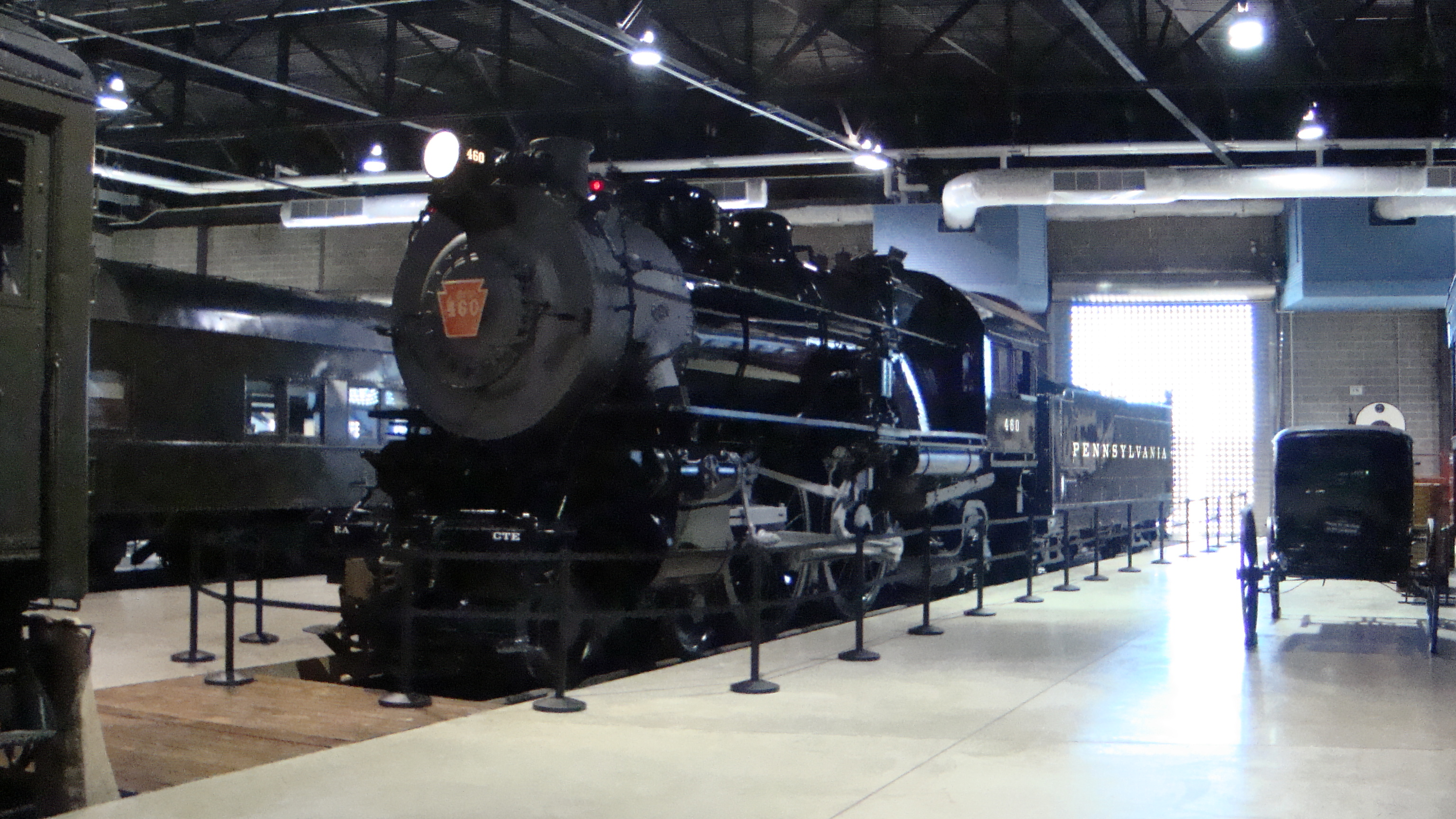
- PRR No. 460 on display at the Railroad Museum of Pennsylvania in November 2016
Type and origin
- Power type: Steam
- Builder: Altoona Works
- Serial number: 2860
- Build date: August 1914
Specifications
- Configuration
  - Whyte: 4-4-2
- Gauge: 4 ft 8 1/2 in (1,435 mm)
- Driver dia.: 80 in (2,032 mm)
- Length: 71 ft 11 in (22 m)
- Axle load: 68,000 lb (31,000 kilograms; 31 metric tons)
- Adhesive weight: 136,000 lb (62,000 kg)
- Loco weight: 243,600 lb (110,500 kg)
- Tender weight: 167,650 lb (76,000 kg)
- Total weight: 411,250 lb (187,000 kg)
- Tender type: 70P66
- Tender cap.: 7,000 US gal (26,000 L)
- Boiler pressure: 205 psi (1,413 kPa)
- Heating surface
  - Firebox: 218 sq ft (20 m^{2})
- Superheater
  - Heating area: 613 sq ft (57 m^{2})
- Cylinders: Two, outside
- Cylinder size: 23.5 in × 26 in (597 mm × 660 mm)
- Valve gear: Walschaerts
- Valve type: Piston valves
- Loco brake: Air
- Train brakes: Air
- Couplers: Knuckle
Performance figures
- Maximum speed: 115 mph (185 km/h)
- Tractive effort: 31,275 lbf (139 kN)
- Factor of adh.: 4.35
Career
- Operators: Pennsylvania Railroad
- Class: E6s
- Nicknames: Lindbergh Engine
- Retired: January 11, 1956
- Restored: 1982–1984, 2010–2016 (cosmetically)
- Current owner: Pennsylvania Historical and Museum Commission
- Disposition: On static display
U.S. National Register of Historic Places
- Official name: Passenger Locomotive No. 460
- Designated: December 17, 1979
- Part of: Pennsylvania Railroad Rolling Stock Thematic Resource
- Reference no.: 79002274

Pennsylvania Railroad 460, nicknamed the "Lindbergh Engine", is a preserved E6s class 4-4-2 "Atlantic" type steam locomotive now located in the Railroad Museum of Pennsylvania, outside of Strasburg, Pennsylvania in the United States. It was built in August 1914 and became famous after racing an aircraft to New York City carrying newsreels of Charles Lindbergh's return to the United States after his transatlantic flight in 1927. In the late 1930s, No. 460 was operated by the Long Island Rail Road, and by the Pennsylvania-Reading Seashore Lines in the early 1950s, before being retired on January 11, 1956. No. 460 is the only surviving locomotive of its class and was listed on the U.S. National Register of Historic Places on December 17, 1979. From 2010 to 2016, No. 460 underwent cosmetic restoration at the Railroad Museum of Pennsylvania.

== Background ==
An experimental Model E6 was developed in 1910 and, after two other "sample" locomotives and four years of tests, it was found that the 4-4-2 Atlantic's speed equaled that of the larger 4-6-2 Pacific's. An additional 80 E6 locomotives were ordered with superheaters and classified as the E6s.

== History ==
No. 460 was the last of the E6s model to be built, out of a total of 80 locomotives. From their construction in 1914 until 1920, the E6s ran mostly on the corridor between New York City and Washington, D.C. After being replaced by the K4s model, the E6s locomotives were relegated to charter services because of their high speed.

After returning from Europe and his transatlantic flight on June 11, 1927, Charles Lindbergh was promoted to Colonel and awarded the Distinguished Flying Cross by President Calvin Coolidge. Two rival newsreel companies, who were each vying to be the first to have their films of the ceremony shown in New York theaters, chartered a train and an aircraft, respectively, from Washington to New York City. No. 460 headed up the charter train, pulling only its tender, a baggage car and a passenger car. The train departed Washington at 12:14 PM and arrived at the Manhattan Transfer, outside of New York City, 2 hours and 56 minutes later. The final leg, through the tunnels underneath the Hudson River, was completed by an electric DD1. No. 460 averaged 82.7 miles per hour (133.1 km/h) and is believed to have attained a maximum speed of 115 miles per hour (185 km/h), but there is no evidence to support the claim by the engineers. Even though the aircraft arrived in New York first, the film brought by No. 460 was in theaters hours before the other, thanks to a film processing lab on board the train's baggage car.

After the race, No. 460 went back to its normal duties until March 1937, when it was loaned to the Long Island Rail Road. In January 1939, No. 460 was returned to the PRR, but was still occasionally used on the Long Island as a "short term 'loaner'". Starting in 1942, it hauled trains between Camden and Bay Head, New Jersey. In 1951, parts for it were taken off other E6s locomotives that were going to be scrapped: the drivers on the engineer's (right) side are from PRR 1565, the air reservoir on the fireman's (left) side was from PRR 690 and the reservoir on the engineer's side was from PRR 782. 460's tender was replaced in 1952 with one from 1565; the original tender had been transferred to maintenance-of-way service. 460 was leased to the Pennsylvania–Reading Seashore Lines in 1953 before being retired on January 11, 1956 and added to the Pennsylvania's collection of historic locomotives in Northumberland, Pennsylvania.

=== Preservation ===
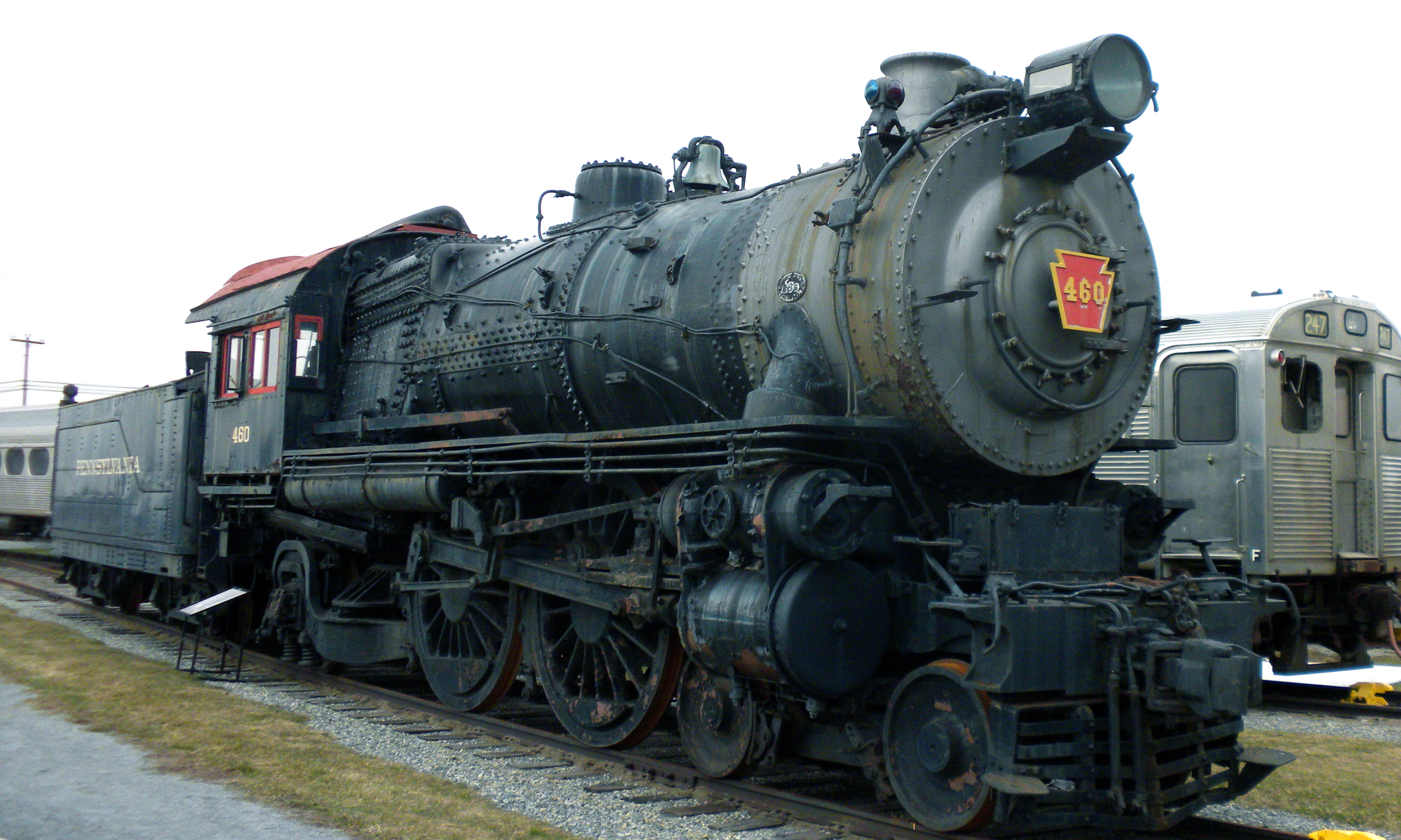
PRR 460 in 2010 before restoration

No. 460 was moved from Northumberland in October, 1969 to the Railroad Museum of Pennsylvania in Strasburg. Although a part of the museum, it was not owned by the Pennsylvania Historical and Museum Commission until it was officially donated to the museum in December 1979 by the Penn Central Transportation Company, which received ownership when the Pennsylvania was merged with the New York Central Railroad. No. 460 was listed on the National Register of Historic Places on December 17, 1979. From 1982 to 1984, volunteers at the museum cleaned the locomotive, replaced wooden window frames and doors, applied rust inhibitor primer and repainted the metal. The locomotive's boiler cladding was removed in 2008. 460 was moved into the museum restoration shops on March 17, 2010, after raising $50,000 and receiving an additional $50,000 donation. From July to August 2010, 460 was "blasted" to remove the several layers of lead paint from the locomotive. The blasting uncovered original timing marks and stamped numbers showing that the origins of some of the parts on 460 were cannibalized from other E6s locomotives. The cosmetic restoration of the 460 was completed in October 2016.

== See also ==
- National Register of Historic Places listings in Lancaster County, Pennsylvania

== Sources ==
- Hart, George M; Zacher, Susan M (March 1978). "Pennsylvania Railroad Rolling Stock Thematic Resource". National Register of Historic Places Inventory—Nomination Form. National Park Service.
- Martin, Allan C (October 2010). "Restoration Update: PRR No. 460" (PDF). Milepost. Railroad Museum of Pennsylvania. Archived from the original (PDF) on November 27, 2010.
- Stauffer, Alvin W (1962). Pennsy Power. Carrollton, Ohio: Standard Print & Publishing. LCCN 62020878.
