= Pennsylvania Railroad class E6 =

Class of PRR 4-4-2 steam locomotive

PRR E6s
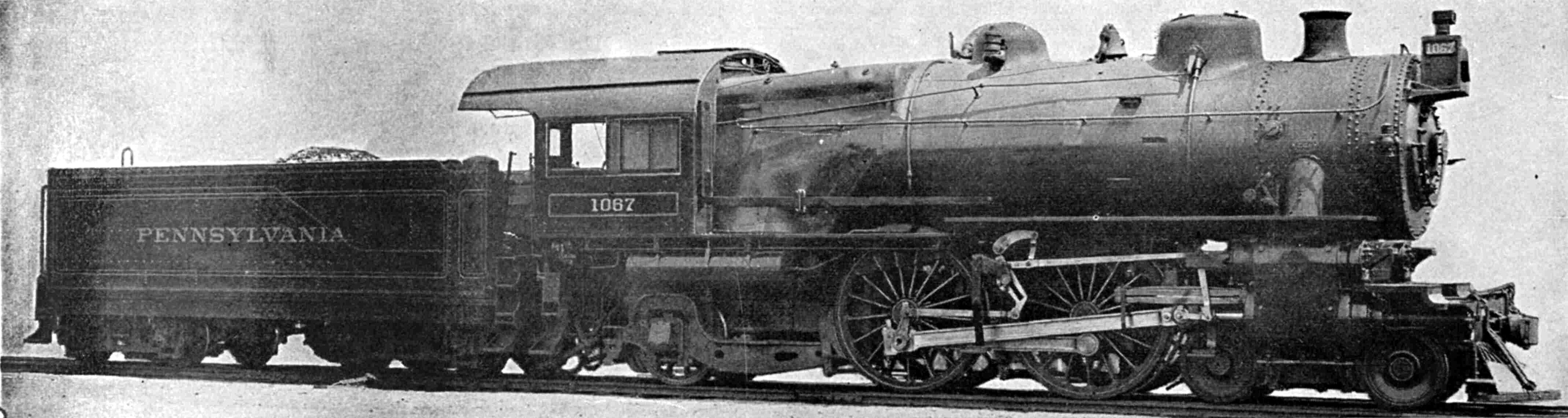
- E6s #1067 in its builder's photograph.
Type and origin
- Power type: Steam
- Designer: Alfred W. Gibbs
- Builder: PRR Juniata Shops
- Build date: 1910–1914
- Total produced: 83
Specifications
- Configuration
  - Whyte: 4-4-2
  - UIC: 2'B1'
- Gauge: 4 ft 8 1/2 in (1,435 mm) standard gauge
- Leading dia.: 36 in (914 mm)
- Driver dia.: 80 in (2,032 mm)
- Trailing dia.: 50 in (1,270 mm)
- Wheelbase: 29 ft 7 1/2 in (9.030 m)
- Length: 41 ft 3 1/2 in (12.586 m) (locomotive only); 72 ft 6 in (22.10 m) (including tender)
- Width: 10 ft 0 in (3.05 m)
- Height: 15 ft 0 in (4.57 m)
- Axle load: 66,000 lb (30,000 kg)
- Adhesive weight: 136,000 lb (62,000 kg)
- Loco weight: 243,600 lb (110,500 kg)
- Total weight: 401,600 lb (182,200 kg)
- Fuel type: Soft coal
- Fuel capacity: 25,000 lb (11,000 kg)
- Water cap.: 7,000 US gal (26,000 L; 5,800 imp gal)
- Firebox
  - Grate area: 55.13 sq ft (5.122 m^{2})
- Boiler pressure: 205 psi (1.41 MPa)
- Heating surface
  - Firebox: 218 sq ft (20.3 m^{2})
  - Tubes: 1,900.66 sq ft (176.577 m^{2})
  - Flues: 777.54 sq ft (72.236 m^{2})
  - Total surface: 2,896.20 sq ft (269.066 m^{2})
- Superheater
  - Heating area: 980 sq ft (91 m^{2}) (E6s only)
- Cylinders: 2
- Cylinder size: 23 1/2 in × 26 in (597 mm × 660 mm)
- Valve gear: Walschaert
- Valve type: piston valves
Performance figures
- Maximum speed: 75 mph (121 km/h)
- Tractive effort: 31,275 lbf (139.12 kN)
- Factor of adh.: 4.35
Career
- Operators: Pennsylvania Railroad, Pennsylvania-Reading Seashore Lines, Long Island Rail Road
- Class: E6s
- Preserved: One preserved (No. 460)
- Disposition: PRR 460 on display, remainder scrapped

The Pennsylvania Railroad Class E6 was the final type of 4-4-2 "Atlantic" locomotive built for the company, and second only to the Milwaukee Road's streamlined class A in size, speed and power. Although quickly replaced on the fastest trains by the larger K4s Pacifics, the E6 remained a popular locomotive on lesser services and some lasted until the end of steam on the PRR. One, #460, called the Lindbergh Engine, is preserved at the Railroad Museum of Pennsylvania. It was moved indoors to begin preparations for restoration on March 17, 2010. On January 10, 2011, PRR #460 was moved to the museum's restoration shop for a two- to three-year project, estimated to cost $350,000. The engine is listed in the National Register of Historic Places.

== Design ==
The E6 was designed by the PRR's General Superintendent of Motive Power, Lines East, Alfred W. Gibbs, and his team. They produced an Atlantic of modern design, featuring a large and free-steaming boiler, outside Walschaert valve gear, piston valves on the cylinders, and a cast steel KW pattern trailing truck designed by the PRR's Chief Mechanical Engineer, William F. Kiesel, Jr. Modern features never present on the E6 design, and never retrofitted, included the mechanical stoker, power reverse and feedwater heater.

== Prototypes and testing ==
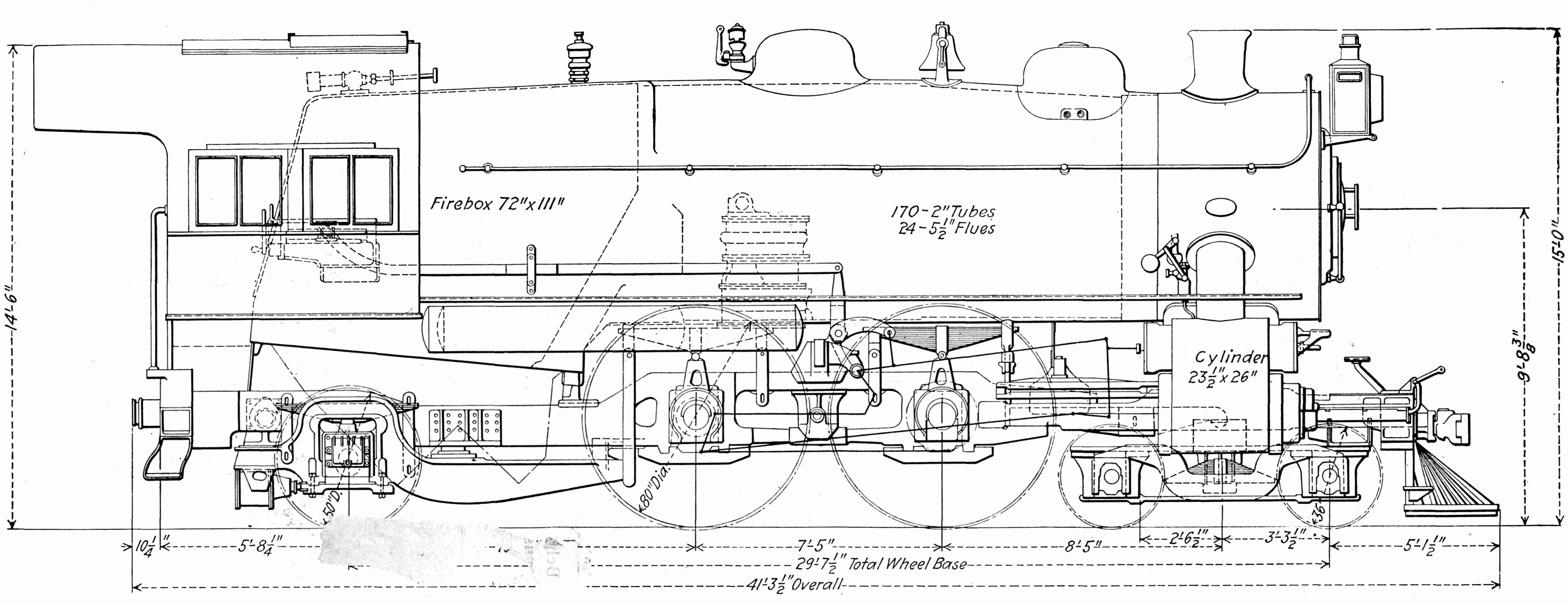
Dimensioned drawing of an E6s.

A single prototype E6 locomotive, #5075, was turned out by the PRR's Juniata Shops in 1910; as was the railroad's standard procedure, it would undergo a thorough process of testing and experimentation before a production order was placed.

By 1910, the larger 4-6-2 "Pacific" type was the accepted express passenger locomotive, and it was somewhat contrarian for the PRR to be considering a new Atlantic class for that service. The E6, however, proved Gibbs et al. correct. The boiler proved free-steaming enough to enlarge the cylinders not once but twice; the stroke remained 26 in (660 mm), but the bore was enlarged first from 22 in (559 mm) to 23 in (584 mm) and finally to 23.5 in (597 mm) after superheating.

In road testing on the Fort Wayne Division, the E6 averaged 75.31 mph (121.20 km/h) start to stop for 105 miles with a nine-car train, as well as 66.6 mph (107.2 km/h) with a thirteen-car train and 58.05 mph (93.42 km/h) with a fifteen-car train. At speeds over 40 mph (64 km/h), the E6 equaled or bettered a K29 Pacific with the original cylinder bore.

Superheating was applied after these tests, and proved itself so well that all other locomotives in the class were built superheated as class E6s, including two further prototypes. On the PRR's static test plant at Altoona Works, the final version of the E6s produced 2,488 hp (1,855 kW) in its cylinders at 56 mph.

Also tested on prototype #1092 (classified E6sa), were rotary valves designed by O. W. Young, actuated by regular Walschaerts gear. These proved successful but insufficiently so to be chosen for production locomotives over the reliable piston valve.

The broad-boilered E-6 was the first locomotive to achieve over 1,000 hp (750 kW) per driving axle.

== Production and service ==
Following the prototypes' successful testing, the PRR ordered a production run of a further eighty locomotives which were delivered in 1914. All were fitted with superheaters. They were largely assigned to main line limiteds between Jersey City or Manhattan Transfer and either Washington, D.C. or Harrisburg, Pennsylvania, although they sometimes ran through to Altoona, Pennsylvania. Larger locomotives were generally used on the mountain grades past Altoona.

All locomotives were fitted with boxy oil-fired headlights from new, and the production locomotives had long tailrods projecting from the front of the cylinders. The tailrods were soon removed, as they were on other PRR classes that had them, and the oil headlights were replaced by electric units and turbogenerators, the latter sited between the headlamp and the stack.

As K4s Pacifics became available in greater numbers in the 1920s, the E6s locomotives were displaced from the fastest trains but continued in service in lesser assignments, and particularly along the New Jersey seashore routes. Nine locomotives were transferred to the rosters of the Pennsylvania-Reading Seashore Lines, and including those all 83 of class E6s were still in service in 1947. Some locomotives were leased by the PRR to subsidiary Long Island Rail Road.

== Lindbergh run ==
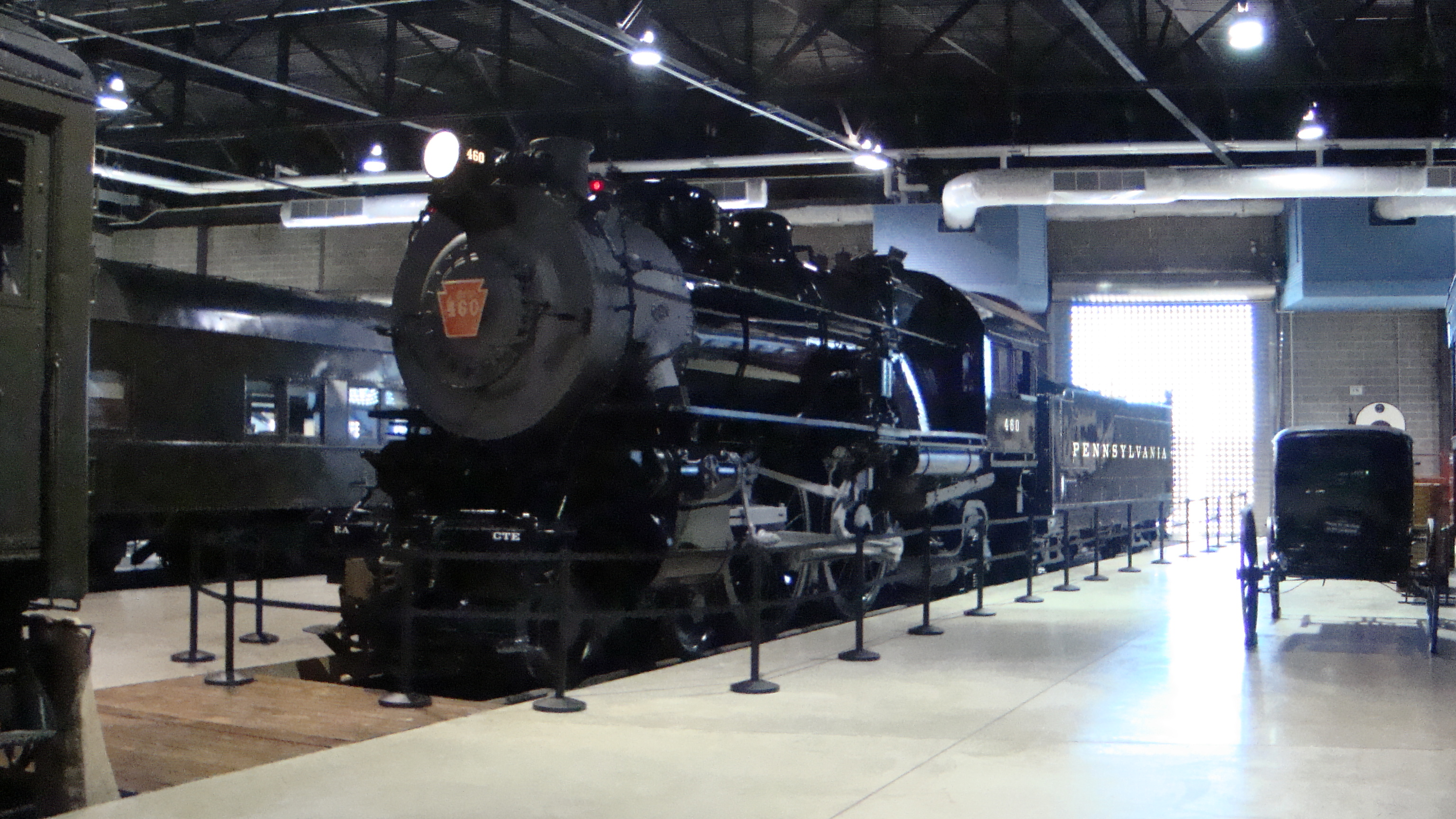
PRR 460 at the Railroad Museum of Pennsylvania

Pioneering aviator Charles Lindbergh returned to the United States on June 11, 1927, after his successful solo transatlantic flight from New York City to Paris; he was greeted by President Calvin Coolidge at Washington, D.C. and awarded the Distinguished Flying Cross. There was intense competition between several newsreel companies to be the first to get footage of the ceremony back to New York to show in the Broadway theaters. Several companies chartered aircraft, but the International News Reel Corporation instead chartered a special train from the Pennsylvania Railroad, repeating what it had done for President Coolidge's inauguration.

A plane could get from Washington to New York faster than a train, but the train could carry a darkroom to develop the film en route, making the train competitive. PRR management seized the opportunity for publicity and set up for a record run. Other trains would be moved out of the way of the Lindbergh newsreel special.

E6s Atlantic #460 was selected, being recently overhauled but having had time to "run in" after the work; B60B baggage car #7874 was equipped as a darkroom and P70 coach #3301 would carry PRR and newsreel company officials. The crew were cleared to run as fast as they considered safe; the tender would not need refueling during the run and the water scoop would pick up water from track pans without stopping. However, the scoop was damaged during the first pickup attempt due to the speed at which the train had been traveling. An unscheduled three-minute stop near Wilmington was needed to repair it and fill up from a standpipe.

The train made it to the electric changeover at Manhattan Transfer with an average speed of 74 mph (119 km/h), a record never beaten by steam on that journey, with a reported maximum speed of 115 mph (185 km/h), but there is no evidence to support the claim. The newsreels brought by train reached the cinema screens over an hour before the ones flown due to the delay to process the latter. The Pennsylvania Railroad used this victory extensively in publicity in the following years.

Due to its historical importance, the "Lindbergh Engine" #460, was selected for preservation as a static exhibit. #460 was added to the National Register of Historic Places in 1979 as Passenger Locomotive No. 460. It was retired from service in 1955.
