= List of ALCO diesel locomotives =

The American Locomotive Company (ALCO), based in Schenectady, New York, United States produced a wide range of diesel-electric locomotives from its opening in 1901 until it ceased manufacture in 1969. This is a list of ALCO locomotive classes.

For individually notable locomotives, please see List of locomotives. There are numerous individual ALCO locomotives that are preserved in museums or heritage railways. In particular please see sublists List of preserved locomotives in the United States and List of preserved locomotives in Canada.

== Boxcab locomotives ==
| Model | Build date | Total produced | Wheel arrangement | Prime mover | Power output | Image |
|---|---|---|---|---|---|---|
| 60-ton | 1925–1928 | 26 | B-B | Ingersoll-Rand 10 in × 12 in (254 mm × 305 mm) | 300 hp (220 kW) | |
| 100-ton | 1925–1928 | 7 | B-B | Ingersoll-Rand 10 × 12 (×2) | 300 hp (220 kW) × 2 | |
| New York Central 1525 | 1928 | 1 | B-B | Ingersoll-Rand 10 in × 12 in (254 mm × 305 mm)/batteries/3rd rail | 300 hp (220 kW) | |
| 66-ton | 1931 | 6 | B-B | McIntosh & Seymour 9½ x 10½ | 300 hp (220 kW) | |

== Switchers ==
| Model | Specification | Build date | Total produced | Wheel arrangement | Prime mover | Power output | Image |
|---|---|---|---|---|---|---|---|
| ALCO 300 | — | 1931–1938 | 11 | B-B | M&S 6-330 | 300 hp (220 kW) | |
| ALCO 600 | — | 1931 | 1 | B-B | 6-531 | 600 hp (450 kW) | |
| HH600 | — | 1931–1939 | 78 | B-B | 6-531 | 600 hp (450 kW) | |
| HH900 | — | 1937–1939 | 21 | B-B | 6-531T | 900 hp (670 kW) | |
| HH660 | — | 1939–1940 | 43 | B-B | 6-538 | 660 hp (490 kW) | |
| HH1000 | — | 1939–1940 | 34 | B-B | 6-538T | 1,000 hp (750 kW) | |
| S-1 | E-1530 | 1940–1950 | 543 | B-B | 6-539 | 660 hp (490 kW) | |
| S-2 | E-1540 | 1940–1950 | 1,462 | B-B | 6-539T | 1,000 hp (750 kW) | |
| S-3 | E-1530A | 1950–1953 | 137 | B-B | 6-539 | 660 hp (490 kW) | |
| S-4 | E-1540A | 1949–1957 | 651 | B-B | 6-539T | 1,000 hp (750 kW) | |
| S-5 | DL420 | 1951 | 1 | B-B | 6-251 | 800 hp (600 kW) | |
| S-5 | DL-421 | 1954 | 7 | B-B | 6-251A | 800 hp (600 kW) | |
| S-6 | DL-430 (1st) | 1955–1960 | 126 | B-B | 6-251B | 900 hp (670 kW) | |
| SB-8/SSB-9 | DL-431/DL-461 | 1956 | 2 sets | B-B+B-B | 6-251B × 2 | 900 hp (670 kW) × 2 | |
| T-6 | DL-440 | 1958–1969 | 57 | B-B | 6-251B | 1,000 hp (750 kW) | |

== Cab units ==
| Model | Specification | Build date | Total produced | Wheel arrangement | Prime mover | Power output | Image |
|---|---|---|---|---|---|---|---|
| Rebel power cars | — | 1935, 1937 | 3 | 2-B | 6-531 | 600 hp (0.45 MW) | |
| — | DL-103b | 1939 | 1 | A1A-A1A | 6-538T × 2 | 1,000 hp (0.75 MW) × 2 | |
| — | DL-105 | 1940 | 3 | A1A-A1A | 6-539T × 2 | 1,000 hp (0.75 MW) × 2 | |
| — | DL-107 | 1940–1941 | 8 | A1A-A1A | 6-539T × 2 | 1,000 hp (0.75 MW) × 2 | |
| — | DL-108 | 1941 | 3 | A1A-A1A | 6-539T × 2 | 1,000 hp (0.75 MW) × 2 | |
| — | DL-109 | 1941–1945 | 62 | A1A-A1A | 6-539T × 2 | 1,000 hp (0.75 MW) × 2 | |
| — | DL-110 | 1942 | 1 | A1A-A1A | 6-539T × 2 | 1,000 hp (0.75 MW) × 2 | |
| — | DL-202 | 1945 | 2 | B-B | 12-241 | 1,500 hp (1.12 MW) | |
| — | DL-203 | 1945 | 1 | B-B | 12-241 | 1,500 hp (1.12 MW) | |
| FA-1 | DL-204, DL206, DL-208, DL-208A, DL-208B | 1946–1950 | 396 | B-B | 12-244A, B | 1,500 hp (1.12 MW) | |
| FA-1 | DL-208C | 1950 | 21 | B-B | 12-244C | 1,600 hp (1.19 MW) | |
| FB-1 | DL205, DL-209, DL-209A, DL-209B | 1946–1950 | 213 | B-B | 12-244A, B | 1,500 hp (1.12 MW) | |
| FB-1 | DL-209C | 1950 | 16 | B-B | 12-244C | 1,600 hp (1.19 MW) | |
| FA-2 | DL-212, DL-212A | 1950–1956 | 308 | B-B | 12-244D, G | 1,600 hp (1.19 MW) | |
| FB-2 | DL-213, DL-213A | 1950–1956 | 181 | B-B | 12-244D, G | 1,600 hp (1.19 MW) | |
| FPA-2 | DL-212, DL-212A | 1950–1951 | 54 | B-B | 12-244D | 1,600 hp (1.19 MW) | |
| FPB-2 | DL-213, DL-213A | 1950–1956 | 25 | B-B | 12-244D | 1,600 hp (1.19 MW) | |
| PA-1 | DL-304, DL-304A, DL-304B | 1946–1949 | 169 | A1A-A1A | 16-244 | 2,000 hp (1.49 MW) | |
| PB-1 | DL-305, DL-305A, DL-305B | 1946–1949 | 39 | A1A-A1A | 16-244 | 2,000 hp (1.49 MW) | |
| PA-2 | DL-304C, DL-304D | 1950–1953 | 81 | A1A-A1A | 16-244 | 2,250 hp (1.68 MW) | |
| PB-2 | DL-305, DL-305D | 1950–1953 | 8 | A1A-A1A | 16-244 | 2,250 hp (1.68 MW) | |

== Four-axle road switchers ==
| Model | Specification | Build date | Total produced | Wheel arrangement | Prime mover | Power output | Image |
|---|---|---|---|---|---|---|---|
| RS-1 | E-1641A | 1941–1960 | 469 | B-B | 6-244T, 6-539T | 1,000 hp (0.75 MW) | |
| RS-2 | E-1661, E-1661A, E-1661B | 1946–1950 | 338 | B-B | 12-244 | 1,500 hp (1.12 MW) | |
| RS-2 | E-1661C | 1950 | 30 | B-B | 12-244 | 1,600 hp (1.19 MW) | |
| RS-3 | E-1662, E-1662A, E-1662B | 1950–1956 | 1,272 | B-B | 12-244 | 1,600 hp (1.19 MW) | |
| RS-11 | DL-701 | 1956–1961 | 433 | B-B | 12-251 | 1,800 hp (1.34 MW) | |
| RS-27 | DL-640 | 1959–1962 | 27 | B-B | 16-251 | 2,400 hp (1.79 MW) | |
| RS-32 | DL-721 | 1961–1962 | 35 | B-B | 12-251 | 2,000 hp (1.49 MW) | |
| RS-36 | DL-701XAP | 1962–1963 | 40 | B-B | 12-251 | 1,800 hp (1.34 MW) | |

== Six-axle road switchers ==
| Model | Specification | Build date | Total produced | Wheel arrangement | Prime mover | Power output | Image |
|---|---|---|---|---|---|---|---|
| RSC-1 | | 1946 | 4 | A1A-A1A | 6-539T | 1,000 hp (0.75 MW) | |
| RSD-1 | E-1641 | 1946 | 6 | C-C | 6-244T, 6-539T | 1,000 hp (0.75 MW) | |
| RSD-1 | E-1645 | 1942-1943 | 57 | C-C | 6-244T, 6-539T | 1,000 hp (0.75 MW) | |
| RSD-1 | E-1646 | 1944–1945 | 100 | C-C | 6-244T, 6-539T | 1,000 hp (0.75 MW) | |
| RSC-2 | E-1661, E-1661A, E-1661B | 1946–1950 | 86 | A1A-A1A | 12-244 | 1,500 hp (1.12 MW) | |
| RSC-2 | E-1661C | 1950 | 5 | A1A-A1A | 12-244 | 1,600 hp (1.19 MW) | |
| RSC-3 | E-1662, E-1662A, E-1662B | 1950–1955 | 99 | A1A-A1A | 12-244 | 1,600 hp (1.19 MW) | |
| RSD-4 | E-1663, E-1663A, E-1663B | 1951–1952 | 36 | C-C | 12-244 | 1,600 hp (1.19 MW) | |
| RSD-5 | E-1664, E-1664A, E-1664B | 1952–1955 | 204 | C-C | 12-244 | 1,600 hp (1.19 MW) | |
| RSD-7 | DL-600 | 1954 | 2 | C-C | 16-244 | 2,250 hp (1.68 MW) | |
| RSD-7 | DL-600A | 1955–1956 | 27 | C-C | 16-244 | 2,400 hp (1.79 MW) | |
| RSD-12 | DL-702 | 1956–1963 | 171 | C-C | 12-251B | 1,800 hp (1.34 MW) | |
| RSD-15 | DL-600B | 1956–1960 | 75 | C-C | 16-251B | 2,400 hp (1.79 MW) | |

== Century series ==
ALCO announced its "Century Series" of diesel locomotives in 1963 as a leap forward in power and reliability, an attempt to compete more aggressively with GM-EMD and GE in the marketplace.

| Model | Specification | Build date | Total produced | Wheel arrangement | Prime mover | Power output | Image |
|---|---|---|---|---|---|---|---|
| C415 | DL-415 | 1966–1968 | 26 | B-B | 8-251F | 1,500 hp (1.12 MW) | |
| C420 | DL-721A | 1963–1968 | 131 | B-B | 12-251C | 2,000 hp (1.49 MW) | |
| C424 | DL-640A | 1963–1967 | 98 | B-B | 16-251B | 2,400 hp (1.79 MW) | |
| C425 | DL-640B | 1964–1966 | 91 | B-B | 16-251C | 2,500 hp (1.86 MW) | |
| C430 | DL-430 (2nd) | 1967–1968 | 16 | B-B | 16-251E | 3,000 hp (2.24 MW) | |
| C628 | DL-628 | 1963–1968 | 186 | C-C | 16-251C | 2,750 hp (2.05 MW) | |
| C630 | DL-630 | 1965–1968 | 133 | C-C | 16-251E | 3,000 hp (2.24 MW) | |
| C636 | DL-636 | 1967–1968 | 63 | C-C | 16-251E | 3,600 hp (2.68 MW) | |
| C855 | DL-855 | 1964 | 2 | B-B+B-B | Dual 16-251 | 5,500 hp (4.10 MW) | |
| C855B | DL-856 | 1964 | 1 | B-B+B-B | Dual 16-251 | 5,500 hp (4.10 MW) | |

== Diesel-hydraulic locomotives ==
| Model | Specification | Build date | Total produced | Wheel arrangement | Prime mover | Power output | Image |
|---|---|---|---|---|---|---|---|
| DH643 | DH-400 | 1964 | 3 | C-C | Dual 12-251C | 4,300 hp (3.21 MW) | |

== Military locomotives ==
| Model | Specification | Build date | Total produced | Wheel arrangement | Prime mover | Power output | Image |
|---|---|---|---|---|---|---|---|
| MRS-1 or RSX-4 | E-1670 | 1953–1954 | 83 | C-C | 12-244D | 1,600 hp (1.19 MW) | |

== Export and narrow gauge locomotives ==
| Model | Specification | Build date | Total produced | Wheel arrangement | Prime mover | Power output | Image |
|---|---|---|---|---|---|---|---|
| FCA-3 | DL212 | 1951-1953 | 23 | A1A-A1A | 12-244D | 1,600 hp (1.19 MW) | |
| FD-3 | DL500 | 1953 | 3 | C-C | 12-244D | 1,600 hp (1.19 MW) | |
| FD-3 | DL500A | 1955 | 16 | C-C | 12-244D | 1,600 hp (1.19 MW) | |
| FPD-5 | DL500A | 1955–1956 | 12 | C-C | 12-244 | 1,600 hp (1.19 MW) | |
| Renfe Class 316 | DL500A | 1957 | 25 | C-C | | | |
| FD-6 | DL500B | 1958–1968 | 141 | C-C | 12-251; 12-251B | 1,600 hp (1.19 MW); 1,800 hp (1.34 MW) | |
| | DL500B1 | | | - | | | |
| SEK class A-301 | DL500C | | | C-C | 12-251B | 1,800 hp (1.34 MW) | |
| FD-7 | DL500CI | 1957-1958 | 99 | C-C | 12-251B | 1,800 hp (1.34 MW) | |
| | DL500CP | 1957-1959 | 59 | - | | | |
| FD-9 | DL500D | | | C-C | 12-251b | 1,800 hp (1.34 MW) | |
| FP-9 | DL500G | 1965–1973 | 131 | C-C | 12-251B | 1,800 hp (1.34 MW) | |
| FPD 9 | DL500S | 1964-1966 | 23 | C-C | ALCO 251-C | 2,180 hp (1.63 MW) | |
| | DL503S | | | - | | | |
| | DL510 | | | - | | | |
| | DL515 | | | - | | | |
| | DL515I | | | - | | | |
| | DL521 | | | - | | | |
| | DL522G | | | - | | | |
| | DL530 | | | - | | | |
| RSD-8 (NSW 48) | DL531 | 1959–1970 | 295 | C-C | 6-251D | 1,060 hp (790 kW) | |
| RSD-8 | DL531A | 1958–1959 | 57 | C-C | 6-251D | 1,060 hp (790 kW) | |
| | DL531B | | | - | | | |
| | DL531G | | | - | | | |
| RS-8 | DL532 | 1966–1974 | 104 | B-B | 6-251D | 1,035 hp (770 kW) | |
| SEK class A-201 | DL532B | 1961–1962 | 10 | B-B | 6-251D | 1,035 hp (770 kW) | |
| | DL533 | | | - | | | |
| | DL534 | | | - | | | |
| RSD-35 | DL535 | 1963 | 40 | C-C | 6-251D | 1,350 hp (1,010 kW) | |
| RSD-35 | DL535 | 1963 | 70(MLW) | C-C | 6-251D | 1,350 hp (1,010 kW) | |
| RSD-39 | DL535-S/DL535-T | 1965–1967 | 76 | C-C | ALCO 251-D | 1,200 hp (890 kW) | |
| YDM-4 RSD-30 | DL535A | 1961–1969 | 100 (#6020-#6049 and #6105-#6129) | C-C | 6-251D | 1,300 hp (970 kW) | |
| ENAFER RSD-35 | DL535B | 1963, 1969, 1974 | 26 | C-C | | 1,200 hp (890 kW) | |
| | DL535C | | | - | | | |
| DL535E | DL535E | 1969 completed by MLW | 10 | C-C | 6-251D | 1,200 hp (890 kW) | |
| | DL535M | 1963 | 115 | - | | | |
| | DL535S | | | A1A-A1A | | | |
| | DL535T | | | - | | | |
| RSD-36 | DL536 | 1978 | 20 | C-C | 6-251D | 1,200 hp (890 kW) | |
| Tunisian Railways 040-DK | DL536B | | | - | | | |
| RSD-37 | DL537 | 1965 | 12 | C-C | 6-251D | 1,200 hp (890 kW) | |
| SEK class A-9101 | DL537 | 1965 | | C-C | 6-251D | 993 kilowatts (1,332 hp) | |
| | DL539 | | | - | | | |
| RSD-16 | DL540 | 1957–1959 | 130 | C-C | ALCO 12-251B | 1,950 hp (1,450 kW) | |
| RSD-16 | DL541 | 1960–1968 | 77 | C-C | 12-251B | 1,830 hp (1,360 kW) | |
| | DL542 | | | - | | | |
| SEK class A-321 | DL543 | 1961–1970 | 117 | C-C | 12-251C | 1,470 kilowatts (1,971 hp) | |
| | DL543A | | | - | | | |
| | DL543SPAP | | | - | | | |
| | DL544 | | | - | | | |
| | DL550; DL550K | 1964 | 1 | - | | | |
| | DL551 | | | - | | | |
| | DL551B | | | - | | | |
| DL-560 | DL560; DL560A | 1963–1964 | 12 | C-C | 12-251B | 2,600 hp (1,940 kW) | |
| | DL560B | 1966 | 3 | - | | | |
| WDM-2/ALCO RSD-29 | DL560C | 1962-1997 | 2962, 18040 – 18079 (1962), 18112 – 18232 (1962 – 1963), 18245 – 18298 (1964 – 1965), 18337 – 18361 (1965) | C-C | 16-251B | 2,600 hp (1,940 kW) | |
| | DL560D | 1974 | 15 | - | | | |

== Montreal Locomotive Works Export locomotives ==
| Model | Specification | Build date | Total produced | Wheel arrangement | Prime mover | Power output | Image |
|---|---|---|---|---|---|---|---|
| | MX615 | 1972–1979 | 74 | C-C-1 | MLW 8-251A | 1,200 hp (890 kW) | |
| | MX620 | 1973–1980 | 145 | C-C | MLW 12-251C | 2,000 hp (1,490 kW) | |
| | MX624 | 1975–1983 | 69 | C-C | MLW 12-251E | 2,400 hp (1,790 kW) | |
| | MX626 | 1972–1982 | 32 | C-C | MLW 12-251E | 2,400 hp (1,790 kW) | |
| OSE class A-451 | MX627 | 1972–1978 | 33 | C-C | MLW 12-251C | 2,750 hp (2,050 kW) | |
| OSE class A-501 | MX636 | 1974–1980 | 10 | C-C | MLW 16-251E | 3,600 hp (2,680 kW) | |
| | MXS620 | 1973–1982 | 100 | C-C | MLW 12-251E | 2,000 hp (1,490 kW) | Double End Cab Units |
| | MXS624 | 1973–1983 | 33 | C-C | MLW 16-251E | 2,400 hp (1,790 kW) | Double End Cab Units |
| | MXS627 | 1978–1980 | 10 | C-C | MLW 16-251C | 2,750 hp (2,050 kW) | Double End Cab Units |
| | MXS630 | 1978–1982 | 33 | C-C | MLW 16-251E | 3,000 hp (2,240 kW) | Double End Cab Units |
