= ALCO Century 415 =

Class of diesel locomotive

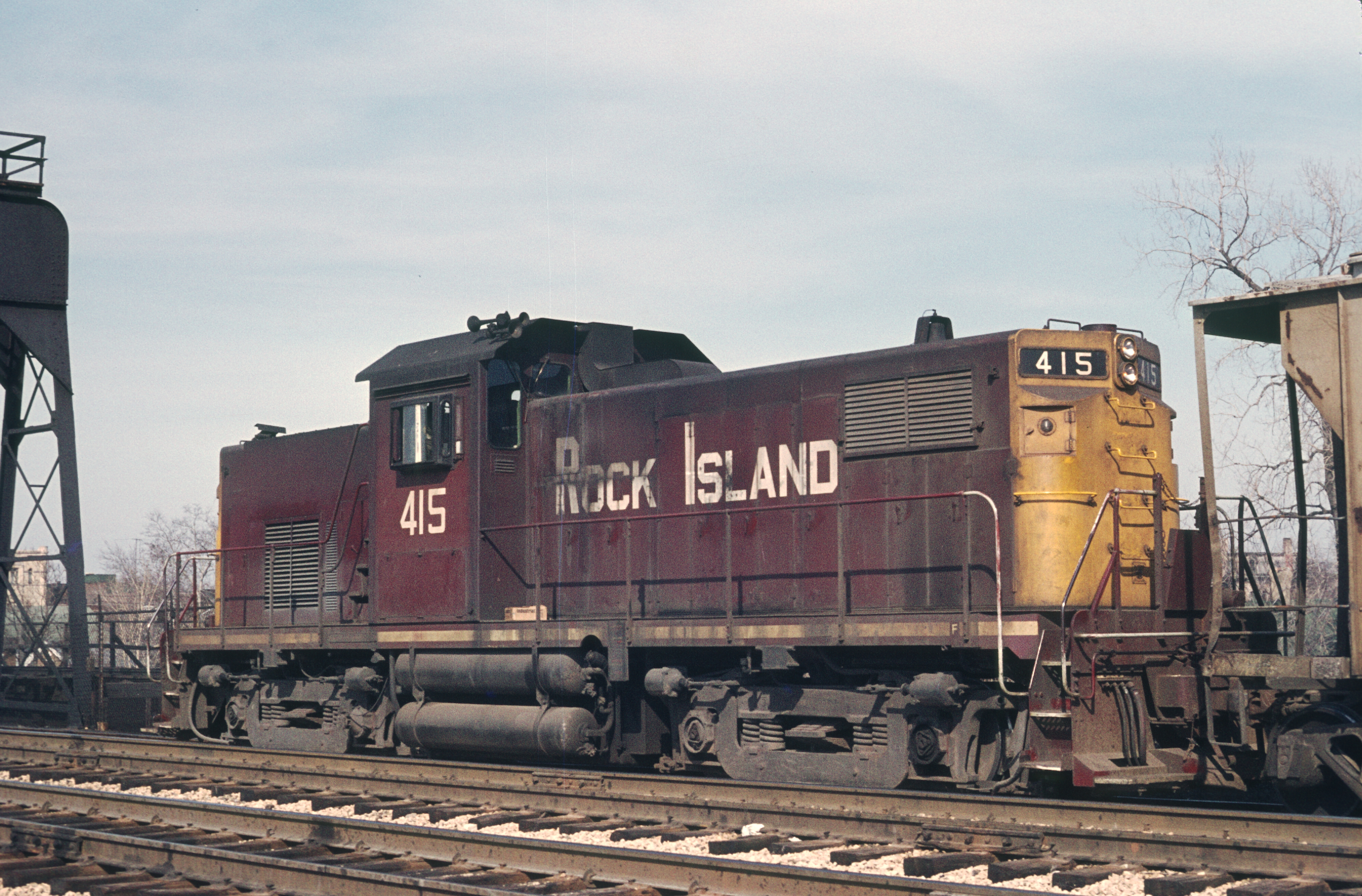
- Rock Island No. 415 in 1972
Type and origin
- Power type: Diesel-electric
- Model: Century 415
- Build date: 1966–1968
- Total produced: 26
Specifications
- Configuration
  - AAR: B-B
- Gauge: 4 ft 8 1/2 in (1,435 mm) standard gauge
- Prime mover: ALCO 8-251-F
- Engine type: Turbocharged four-stroke diesel
- Cylinders: 8
Performance figures
- Power output: 1,500 hp (1,100 kW)

The ALCO Century 415 is a diesel-electric locomotive of B-B wheel arrangement produced by the American Locomotive Company (ALCO) as part of their Century Series of locomotives.

== Specifications ==
The C415 is a large switcher locomotive or small road switcher locomotive equipped with a raised cab mounted slightly off-center, with a lower, narrower hood on either side. The longer one contained the diesel engine, a 1,500 hp (1.1 MW) eight-cylinder turbocharged Alco 251-F, while the shorter contained auxiliaries. The C415 could be ordered with three different cab heights; a low one for minimum clearances, a regular height one, and an extra-height one for maximum visibility.

Trucks fitted were either Type B standard road trucks or ALCO Hi-Ad (high adhesion) Type B trucks.

== Service history ==
The locomotive was not very popular; 26 were built between 1966 and 1968 for seven owners. As of 2011, the Burlington Junction Railway owned three C415s numbered 21, 701 and 702.

== Original owners ==
- Hamersley Iron in Western Australia bought the prototype in May 1968, formerly lettered as ALCO 415. The locomotive was equipped with a medium height cab and AAR Type B trucks.
- Chehalis Western Railroad bought a single high cab unit with Hi-Ad trucks.
- Columbia and Cowlitz Railway bought a single high cab unit with Hi-Ad trucks. (Both the Columbia and Cowlitz and the Chehalis Western are Weyerhaeuser properties)
- Monongahela Connecting Railroad bought a single low cab unit with Hi-Ad trucks.
- Chicago, Rock Island and Pacific Railroad bought ten medium cab units with AAR Type B trucks.
- Southern Pacific Railroad bought ten high cab units with Type B road trucks.
- Spokane, Portland and Seattle Railway bought two medium cab units with Hi-Ad trucks; these were passed to the Burlington Northern Railroad, 4010-4011 after a merger between the two railroads. More units were on order when Alco ended locomotive production in 1969.

== Preservation ==
- Southern Pacific Railroad 2406 is in Monterrey, Mexico, lettered as Fundidora Monterrey Steel 25.
- Hamersley Iron 1000, formerly Alco Demonstrator 415 is at the Pilbara Railways Historical Society in Western Australia.
- Monongahela Connecting Railroad 701 is at the Railroad Museum of Pennsylvania.
- Chehalis Western Railroad 684 is at Fife History Museum and Cultural Center in Fife, Washington.
- Buffalo Southern Railroad 423, formerly Chicago, Rock Island and Pacific Railroad 423 is at the Buffalo Southern's Hamburg Shops in Hamburg, New York.

== See also ==
- List of ALCO diesel locomotives
