= ALCO Century 420 =

2,000-hp 4-axle diesel locomotive

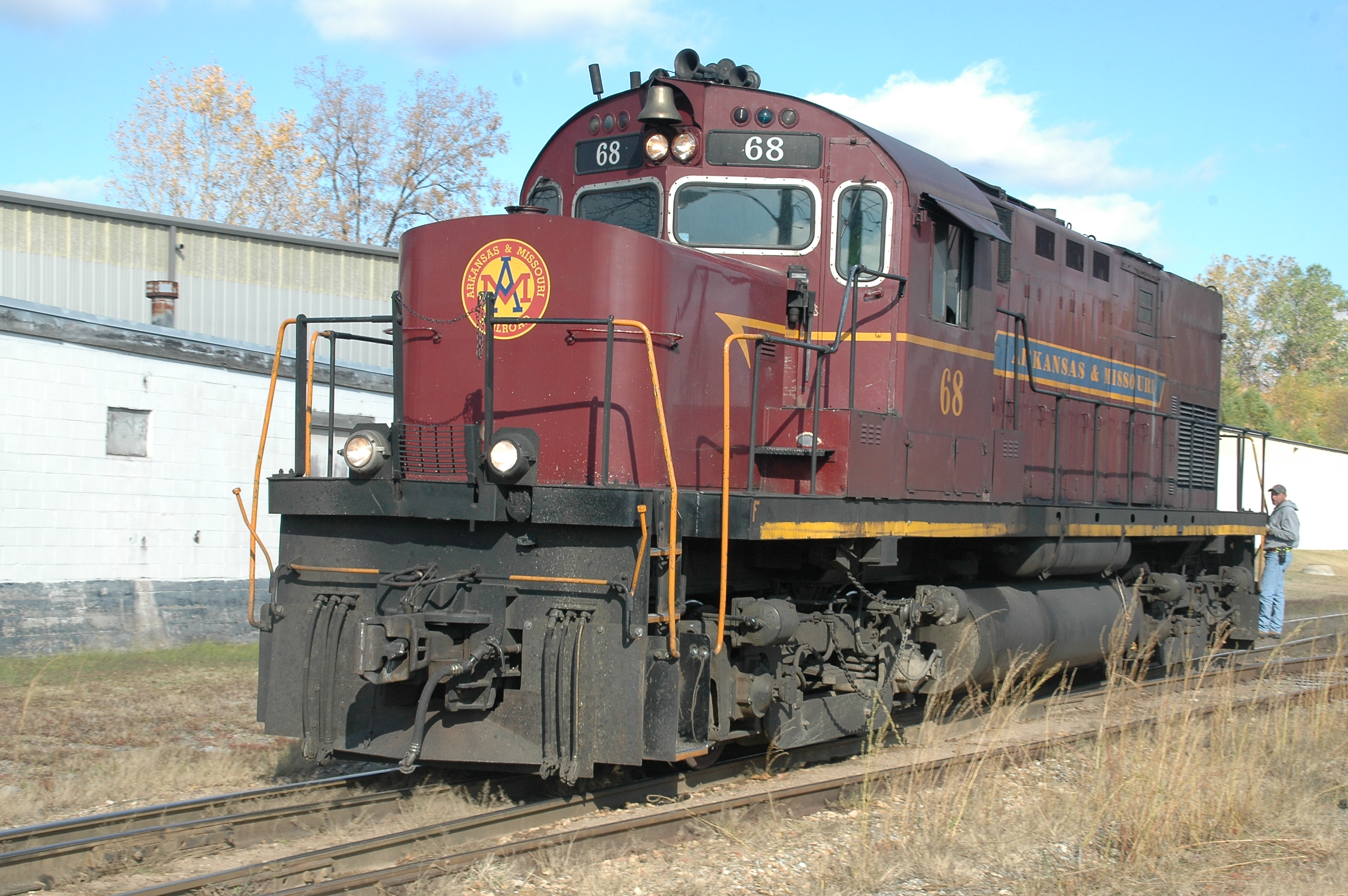
- Arkansas and Missouri Railroad 68, an ALCO C420
Type and origin
- Power type: Diesel-electric
- Builder: ALCO
- Model: Century 420
- Build date: June 1963 – August 1968
- Total produced: 131
Specifications
- Configuration
  - AAR: B-B
- Gauge: 4 ft 8 1/2 in (1,435 mm) standard gauge
- Prime mover: ALCO 12-251C
Performance figures
- Power output: 2,000 hp (1,491 kW)

The ALCO Century 420 is a four-axle, 2,000 horsepower (1,491 kW) diesel-electric locomotive. 131 were built between June 1963 and August 1968. Cataloged as a part of ALCO's "Century" line of locomotives, the C420 was intended to replace the earlier RS-32 model.

== Original owners ==
Owner	Quantity
Erie Mining	3
Ferrocarril del Sureste	2
Lehigh and Hudson River Railway	9
Lehigh Valley Railroad	12
Long Island Rail Road	30
Louisville & Nashville Railroad	16
Monon Railroad	18
Mississippi Export Railroad	1
New York, Chicago & St. Louis Railroad	1
Norfolk & Western Railroad	8
Piedmont and Northern Railway	2
Seaboard Air Line Railroad	27
Tennessee Central Railway	2
Total	131

Since 2005, roughly 30% of C420 production exists. All units ordered by Mississippi Export, New York, Chicago & St. Louis Railroad ("Nickel Plate"), and Piedmont & Northern Railway have been scrapped.

The two units delivered to the Piedmont & Northern were the first of the Phase II units.

== Surviving examples ==
Several C420s survive today.

- Ferrocarrill del Sureste #5700 is preserved as NdeM #5700 at the Museo de los Ferrocarriles de Yucatán in Mérida, Yucatán
- Lehigh Valley Railroad #405 and #414 are operational on the Delaware Lackawanna Railroad in Scranton, Pennsylvania.
- Lehigh Valley Railroad #408 is preserved as VLIX #2064 at the Southern Appalachia Railway Museum in Oak Ridge, Tennessee.
- Long Island Rail Road #200 is operational in active freight service on the Livonia, Avon and Lakeville Railroad in New York.
- Long Island Rail Road #213 is owned by the Arkansas & Missouri as A&M #69. It was previously active until 2021 on the Dakota Southern Railway in Mitchell, South Dakota as DS #213.
- Long Island Rail Road #220 is preserved as NdeM #220 at the Museo de los Ferrocarriles de Yucatán in Mérida, Yucatán.
- Louisville & Nashville Railroad #1310 and #1315 are preserved at the Southern Appalachia Railway Museum in Oak Ridge, Tennessee.
- Seaboard Air Line Railroad #124 is operational as CVSR #365 on the Cuyahoga Valley Scenic Railroad in Independence, Ohio.
- Tennessee Central Railway #400 is operational on the Apache Railway as their #82.

== See also ==
- List of ALCO diesel locomotives
- List of MLW diesel locomotives
