= ALCO DL420 =

ALCO DL420 (S-5 prototype)
Type and origin
- Power type: Diesel-electric
- Builder: ALCO
- Model: S-5
Specifications
- Configuration
  - AAR: B-B
- Gauge: 4 ft 8 1/2 in (1,435 mm)
Performance figures
- Power output: 800 hp (600 kW)

The ALCO DL420 was the prototype ALCO S-5 diesel-electric switcher locomotive.

It was built in August, 1951 using an early six-cylinder 251 engine rated at 800 horsepower (600 kW) and RS-3 subassemblies in its construction. It rode on two-axle trucks with a B-B wheel arrangement, and was the first ALCO switcher with a front radiator opening. This one-of-a-kind unit spent its time at the Niskayuna test facility, then at Schenectady as a shop switcher (#6). It was scrapped in the late 1950s.

== See also ==
- List of ALCO diesel locomotives
- List of MLW diesel locomotives
