= ALCO T-6 =

Model of American diesel-electric locomotive

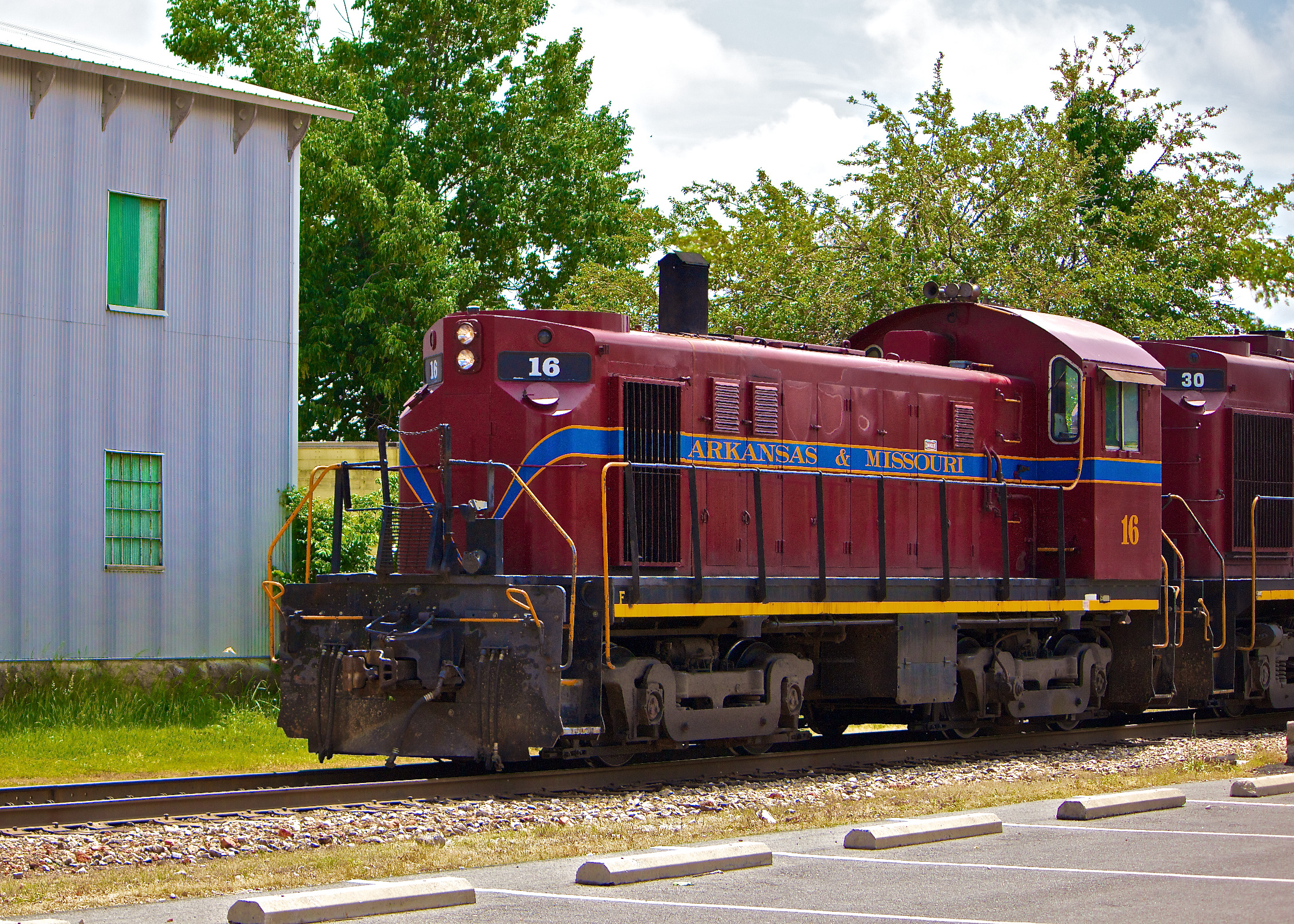
- Arkansas and Missouri Railroad #16
Type and origin
- Power type: Diesel-electric
- Builder: ALCO
- Model: T-6 (Specification DL440)
- Build date: March 1958 – January 1969
- Total produced: 57
Specifications
- Configuration
  - AAR: B-B
- Gauge: 4 ft 8 1/2 in (1,435 mm)
- Prime mover: ALCO 6-251B
- Traction motors: Four GE 752
- Cylinders: Straight 6
Performance figures
- Maximum speed: 60 mph (97 km/h)
- Power output: 1,000 hp (750 kW)
- Tractive effort
  - Starting: 60,000 lbf (270 kN)
  - Continuous: 46,000 lbf (200 kN)
Career
- Disposition: 17 in service on shortline railroads, 2 preserved, rest presumed scrapped

The Alco T6 (DL 440) is a diesel-electric switcher locomotive rated at 1,000 horsepower (750 kW), that rides on two-axle trucks, having a B-B wheel arrangement.

The 'T' stands for 'Transfer', meaning this locomotive is capable of faster transition and higher sustained speeds than the regular 'S' - type yard switcher series. A major difference underlying this shift is the use of the heavier GE 752 traction motors, as used on road locomotives, in place of the GE 731 traction motors used on nearly all Alco's preceding switchers. The 752 motors give the T-6 a very substantial increase in continuous tractive effort, which greatly improved its slow-speed lugging performance.

The T-6 was the last series of locomotives built by Alco. The last T-6 built in 1969, the same year that the company had left the locomotive business. This last locomotive is Newburgh and South Shore #1017 which survives today in operation on the West Michigan Railroad.

== Original owners ==
Image	Railroad	Quantity	Road numbers	Notes
	Altos Hornos de México, S.A.	2	126–127	
	Brewster Phosphate	2	16–17	
	Kaiser Steel	2	1022–1023	
	Monongahela Connecting Railroad	1	400	Hi-Ad trucks
	Newburgh and South Shore Railroad	2	1016–1017	Last locomotives built by Alco; 1016 and 1017 are known to survive.
	Norfolk and Western Railway	40	10–49	40–41 to Chesapeake Western Railway renumbered 10 and 11
	Pennsylvania Railroad	6	8424–8429	8427 is known to survive.
	Portland Terminal Railroad (formerly Northern Pacific Terminal) (Oregon)	2	46–47	

== Survivors ==
The Delaware Coast Line Railroad, the Ohio Central Railroad System and the Arkansas and Missouri Railroad operate the T-6. Ohio Central's T-6 is unique because it was the only one built (for Monongahela Connecting Railroad) with Hi-Ad trucks. 14 T-6's survive in all.

Pennsylvania RR 8427 survives as Georges Creek Railway 101. It was that railroad's first locomotive acquisition and is often used to switch the NewPage paper mill at Luke, Maryland.

Newburg and South Shore Railroad 1017 survives on the West Michigan Railroad.

Newburg and South Shore Railroad 1016 survives as Middletown and Hummelstown Railroad 1016.

Norfolk and Western Railway #40 survives as a static display in the Virginia Museum of Transportation. It has been restored to Chesapeake and Western #10 paint.

Norfolk and Western Railway #41 is operated by the Roanoke Chapter, NRHS. It has been restored to Norfolk and Western lettering and makes operating appearances at the Virginia Museum of Transportation.

== See also ==
- List of ALCO diesel locomotives
- List of MLW diesel locomotives
