= ALCO Century Series locomotives =

Line of road switcher locomotives

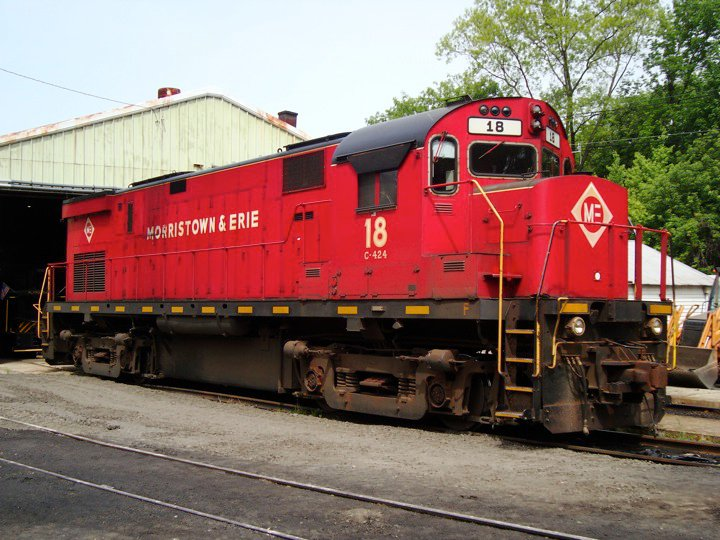
Morristown & Erie C424 in May 2010

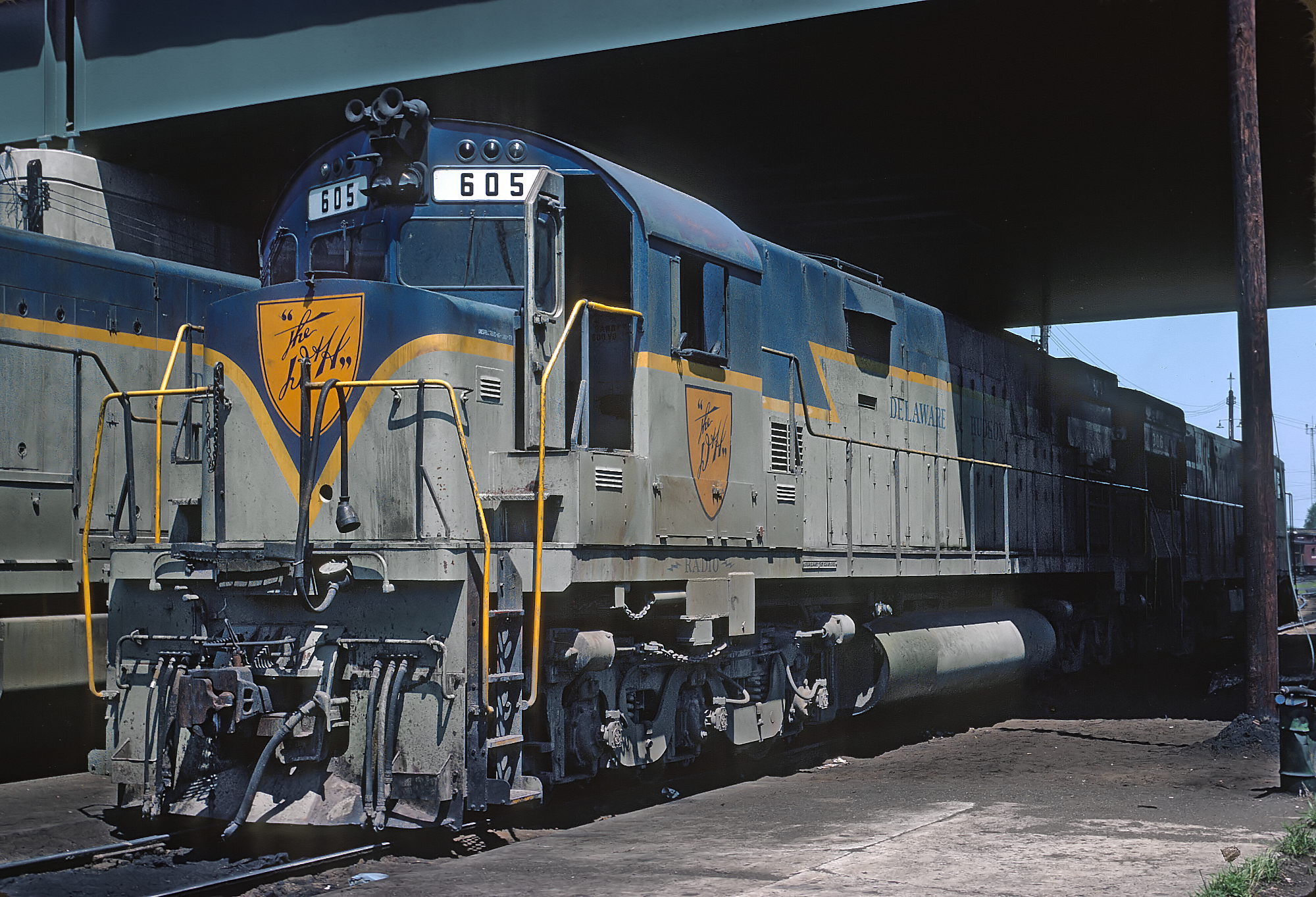
Delaware & Hudson C628 in August 1971

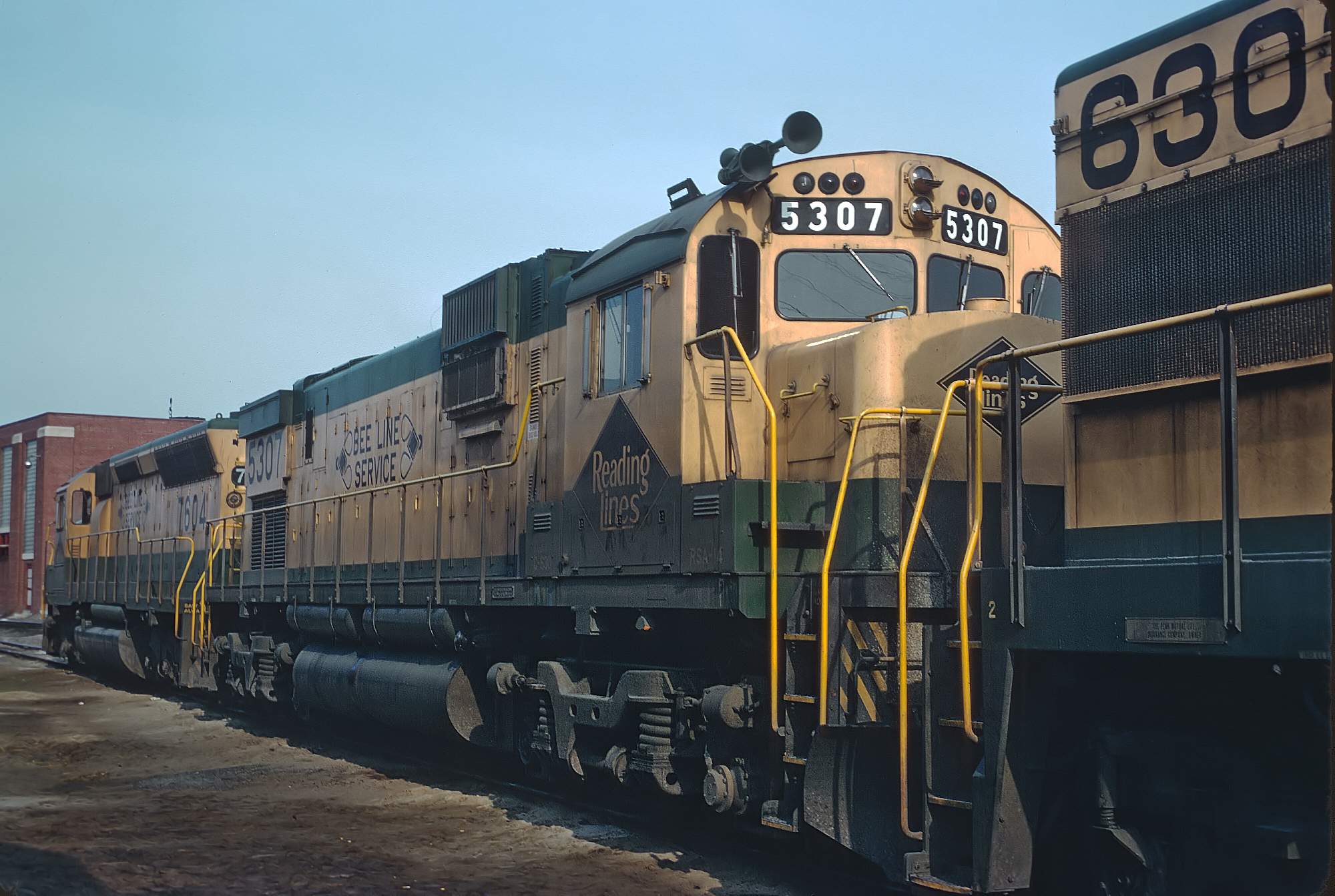
Reading Company C630 in May 1970

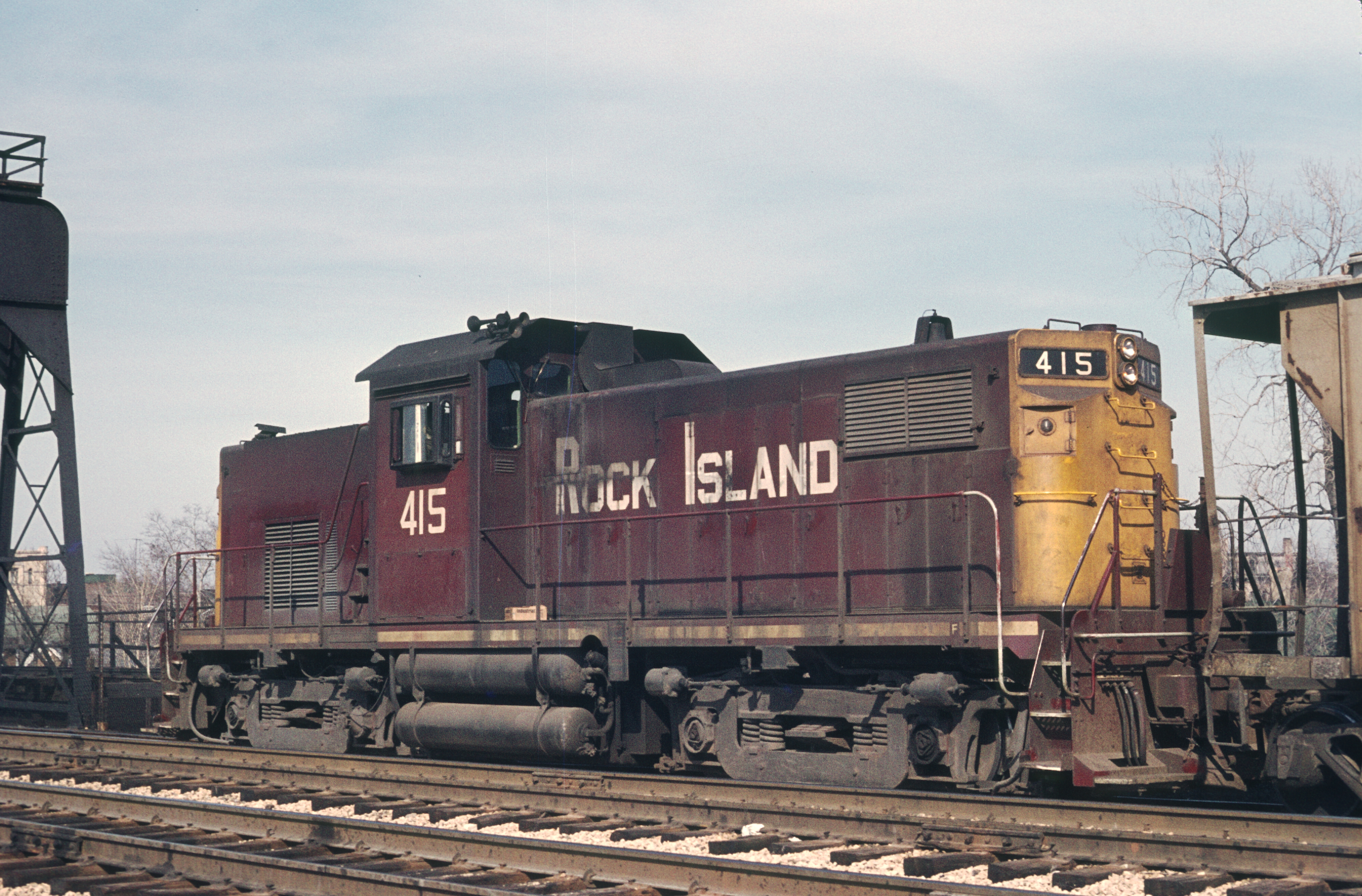
Chicago, Rock Island & Pacific Railroad C415

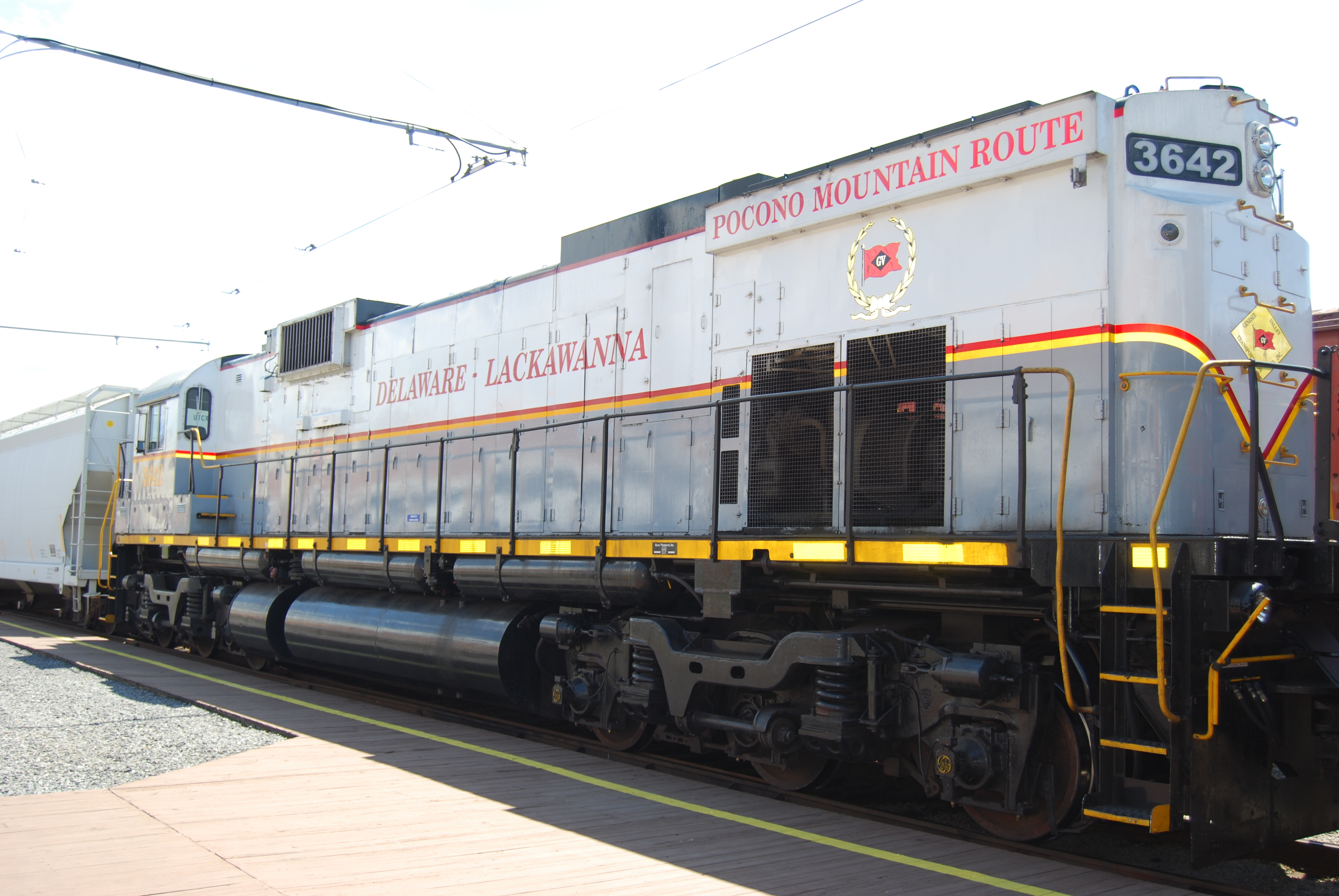
Delaware-Lackawanna Railroad C636 in August 2008

The ALCO Century Series locomotives were a line of road switcher locomotives produced by Alco, the Montreal Locomotive Works and AE Goodwin under license in Australia.

Production of the Century Series began in 1963 and ended in 1972. MLW and Goodwin continued to build Century locomotives after Alco ended locomotive production and shut down in early 1969. A total of 841 locomotives, in eleven variants, were produced over the ten years of production.

== Background and development ==
During the 1950s, EMD had become the major player in the North American diesel locomotive market, with Alco relegated to second place. This was largely due to its 244 diesel engine suffering from significant reliability issues. In response to these issues a new engine design, the ALCO 251, was approved for development in 1951. This engine was put through nearly five years of testing before entering domestic production in four sizes (900 horsepower (670 kW), 1,800 horsepower (1,300 kW), 2,000 horsepower (1,500 kW), and 2,400 horsepower (1,800 kW)) in a new line of locomotives. The first digit of the new locomotive models indicated the number of axles and the remaining two rounded off the engine output to the nearest 100 horsepower.

By 1956 General Electric had launched its first Universal Series road locomotives primarily as export units. The U25B followed in 1961 and rapidly propelled GE into second place in the locomotive market, behind EMD.

Faced with this market situation, Alco in 1962 completely redesigned its road locomotive line, creating what would become the Century Series. The locomotives were designed to equal and surpass competitors' products in terms of both features and performance. To meet that end, the new locomotives included, among other features, a redesign of the air system, an improved traction control system, and improved accessibility and maintainability.

The series was first introduced on January 29, 1963, in Chicago, Illinois, consisting of three locomotives, the 2,000-horsepower B-B model C420, 2,400-horsepower B-B model C424, and the 2,400-horsepower C-C model C624, which was subsequently abandoned in favor of a more powerful model, the 2,750-horsepower C628. During speeches at the event, Alco executives promoted the new locomotives' reduced operating costs, a major effort in the design of the machines. Combined with unit reduction through higher powered locomotives, as well as liberal trade-in terms, Alco claimed operating cost could be reduced as much as 44%.

== Production models ==
=== C420 ===
The C420 was one of the first models launched, and was powered by a 2,000-horsepower, 12-cylinder, Model 251C engine. It was launched at the inaugural event for the Century series in 1963, and remained in production until 1968. A total of 131 units were built, including 22 passenger models for the Long Island Rail Road in 1963, supplemented in 1968 by an additional order of eight more with Alco's Hi-Ad trucks.

=== C424 ===
The C424 was another of the initial models launched, and was powered by a 2,400-horsepower, 16-cylinder, Model 251B engine. It remained in production until 1967. A total of 190 units were built, although only 53 went to domestic customers; the remainder went to Mexican or Canadian customers.

=== C628 ===
The C628 was intended as a replacement for the C624. The latter was announced at the Chicago launch event, but never produced due to being made rapidly obsolete by improvements in engine technology. The C628 was powered by a 2,750-horsepower, 16-cylinder, Model 251C engine. It was launched in 1963, and remained in production until 1968. A total of 186 units were produced, including five exported to Hamersley Iron, Australia.

=== C425 ===
The C425 was launched in 1964 in response to a request from Erie-Lackawanna for a 2,500-horsepower B-B locomotive, and was powered by a 2,500-horsepower, 16-cylinder Model 251C engine. It remained in production until December 1966, just five months before the final C424 was delivered in May 1967. A total of 91 units were built.

=== C855 ===
The C855 was launched in 1964 in response to a request from Union Pacific for a dual engine unit to replace up to ten first-generation locomotives. It was powered by two Model 251C 16-cylinder engines, each producing 2,750 horsepower for a total of 5,500. Only three were built, all in 1964. Two of the units had control cabs and one was a booster unit. Ultimately, poor performance led to their retirement after less than eight years in service.

=== C630 ===
The C630 was launched in 1965, prompted by the impending launches of locomotives by both GE and EMD of equivalent size, and was the first production locomotive to use AC technology, as DC generators were too large and complex to be used at such high powers. It was powered by a 3,000-horsepower, 16-cylinder, Model 251E engine. It was launched in 1965, and remained in production until 1967, with 77 units produced.

=== C630M ===
The C630M was the Canadian version of the C630. It was built by MLW from 1967 to 1969. A total of 56 units were produced.

=== C430 ===
The C430 was a four-axle equivalent of the C630, and used the same AC equipment and engines. It was launched in 1966 as the latest update of B-B locomotives, and introduced Alco's new high-adhesion truck, offered as an option on the C630, but standard on the C430. Production ended in 1967, after 16 were produced.

=== C415 ===
The C415 was launched in 1966 as a new switcher, designed for operation by a single person. It used a 1,500-horsepower, 8-cylinder, Model 251E engine, configured as a V8. It remained in production until 1968, with 26 units built.

=== C636 ===
The C636 was launched in 1967 in response to the introduction of the EMD SD45, which offered more power than anything in production at the time. The C636 was powered by a 3,600-horsepower, 16-cylinder, Model 251F engine. Alco built 34 units through 1968. AE Goodwin built 31 units in Australia under licence from Alco between 1968 and 1972. Total production was 65 units.

=== C643DH ===
Alco built three hydraulic drive locomotives for Southern Pacific in 1964. These units were equipped with the Voith hydraulic drive system and a pair of 12-cylinder 251 engines producing 2,150 horsepower each for a combined total of 4,300 horsepower.

== Unproduced models ==
=== C624 ===
The C624 was one of the original models announced at the launch event, but never went into production, its design having been eclipsed by rapid advances in engine technology. The successor to it was the C628.

=== C620 ===
The C620 would have been a 2,000-horsepower, six-axle locomotive, powered by the same engine as the C420. The design was proposed to several railroads, but no orders were placed.

=== C428 ===
The C428 would have been a 2,750-horsepower, four-axle locomotive, powered by the same engine as the C628. Due to the complexity of DC generators at this level of power, the AC powered C430 was developed instead.

=== C636P and C636F ===
The C636P and C636F would have been cowled (full-width enclosed carbody) units based on the C636. The C636P was a dual service design, and the C636F was Alco's response to a request by the Santa Fe Railroad for a cowled locomotive in both cab and booster form.

=== C650DH ===
This was a proposed 5,000-horsepower hydraulic-drive twin diesel-engined locomotive.

== Order totals ==
| Type | 1963 | 1964 | 1965 | 1966 | 1967 | 1968 | Total |
|---|---|---|---|---|---|---|---|
| C424 | 27 | 48 | 20 | 3 | | | 98 |
| C420 | 6 | 45 | 36 | 24 | 12 | 8 | 131 |
| C628 | 4 | 41 | 72 | 30 | 13 | 26 | 186 |
| C855 | | 3 | | | | | 3 |
| C425 | | 41 | 38 | 12 | | | 91 |
| C630 | | | 3 | 60 | 14 | | 77 |
| C430 | | | | 2 | 14 | | 16 |
| C415 | | | | 21 | | 5 | 26 |
| C636 | | | | | 3 | 31 | 34 |
| Total | 37 | 181 | 169 | 152 | 56 | 70 | 665 |
