= Delaware Coast Line Railroad =

Overview
- Headquarters: Georgetown, Delaware
- Reporting mark: DCLR
- Locale: Sussex County, Delaware
- Dates of operation: 1982–2018

Technical
- Track gauge: 4 ft 8 1/2 in (1,435 mm) standard gauge
- Length: 23 mi (37.0 km)

Other
- Website: none

The Delaware Coast Line Railroad (reporting mark DCLR) was a short-line railroad located in Sussex County, Delaware. The company operated two lines on track owned by the State of Delaware: one running from Ellendale east to Milton and another running from Georgetown east to Cool Spring. The railroad interchanged with the Delmarva Central Railroad in Ellendale and Georgetown. It was owned by Dan Herholdt. Part of the rail lines were taken over by the Delmarva Central Railroad.

== History ==
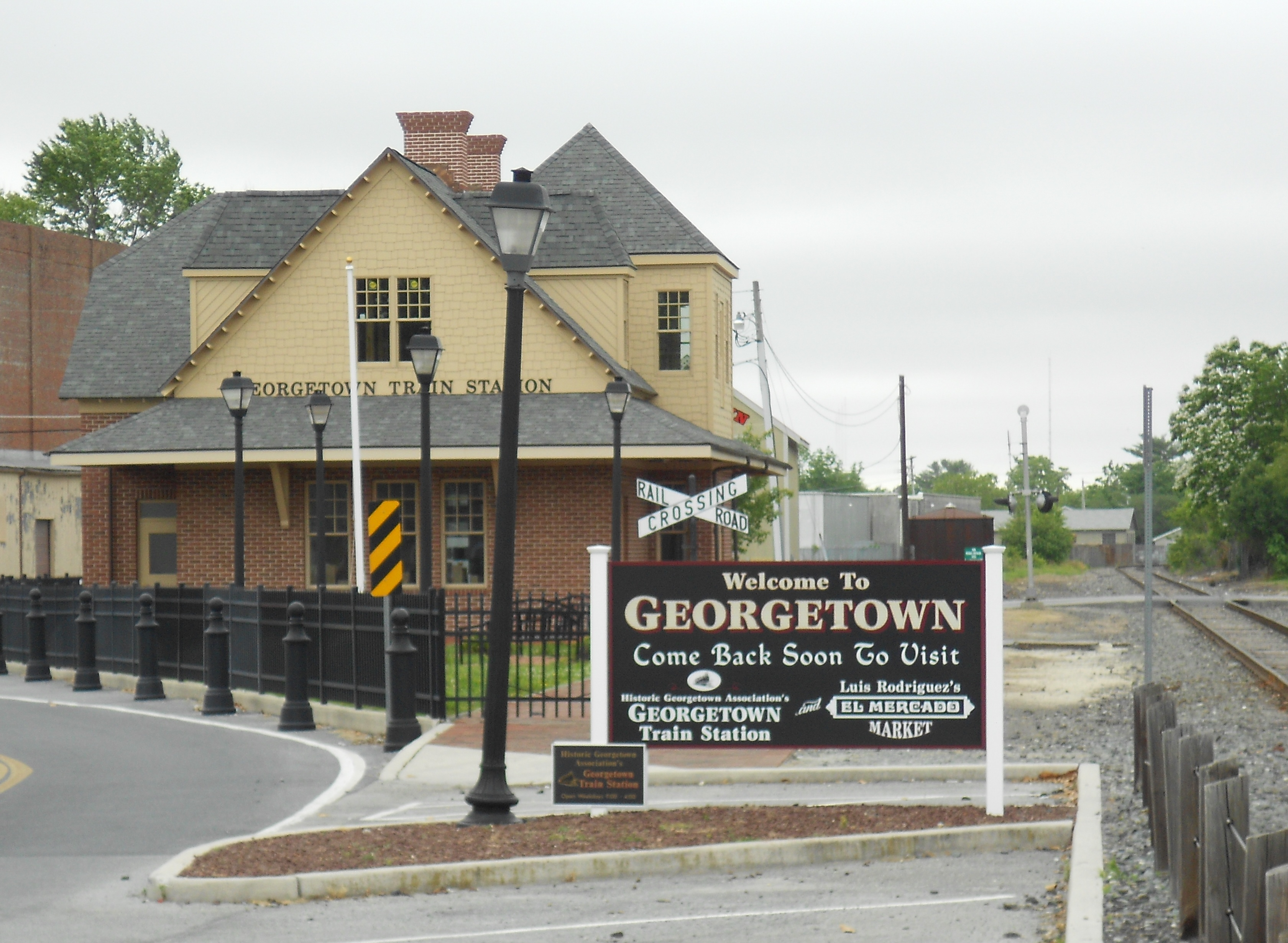
Historic railway station in Georgetown, Delaware, located along track formerly used by Queen Anne's Railroad

The Milton Industrial Track operated by Delaware Coast Line Railroad (DCLR) was part of the former Queen Anne's Railroad (QA), which began providing rail service between Queenstown, Maryland, and Lewes, Delaware, in 1894, and extended its track to Love Point, Maryland, in 1902. The Georgetown to Lewes branch was part of the Junction and Breakwater which formed in 1857 with a 38-mile line from a junction to the Delaware Railroad in Harrington to the Delaware Breakwater. It added the Georgetown-to-Lewes spur in 1870.

Through a complex chain of acquisitions in 1905, the track previously owned by QA became part of the Maryland, Delaware & Virginia Railway Company (MD&V), a subsidiary of the Pennsylvania Railroad (PRR). MD&V was consolidated with another subsidiary in 1923 to form the Baltimore & Eastern Railroad (B&E), which incorporated in Maryland on June 13, 1923. Passenger service on the B&E was discontinued in October 1931.

The lines passed from PRR to Penn Central in 1968 and Conrail in 1976. In 1981, Conrail announced plans to abandon the railroad lines between Ellendale and Milton and between Georgetown and Lewes. The same year, a group of private investors led by Mike Herholdt of Milford purchased the two lines, saving them from abandonment. DCLR incorporated in Delaware on June 23, 1982, and began operating the Ellendale-Milton and Georgetown-Lewes segments of the former QA under contract with the Delaware Department of Transportation (DelDOT), current owner of these segments.

The Maryland & Delaware Railroad (MDDE) assumed operation of the two rail lines in 1994 when it was awarded a five-year contract by Delaware. MDDE did not seek renewal of the Delaware contract and operation of the two lines was returned to DCLR in 1999.

As of 2015, DCLR was led by Dan Herholdt, the son of founder Mike Herholdt. The railroad hauled approximately 550 cars per year. The sole customer along the Ellendale to Milton line was a propane distributor. Customers along the Georgetown-Lewes line included two propane distributors along with Mountaire Farms, for whom the railroad hauled dry distiller's grain that is used in chicken feed. DCLR also served SPI Pharma, a manufacturer of chemical components for antacids, at the end of the line near Cape Henlopen State Park in Lewes. DCLR was based in out of a shop at the Sussex County industrial park in Georgetown and had eight employees who performed multiple duties for the railroad. The railroad maintained tracks, signals, and sidings for private companies throughout the Delmarva Peninsula and also offered railcar storage.

DCLR crossed over the Lewes and Rehoboth Canal in Lewes on a historic, anachronistic swing bridge that had to be hand-cranked in order to reach SPI Pharma. The swing bridge was originally built in 1869 and modernized by PRR in 1916. The bridge was reconstructed in 1997.

In September 2016, the swing bridge was found to be structurally unsound, having dropped 7-8 inches due to settlement in the canal and seeing some pieces of timber split. As a result, the bridge was closed to rail traffic by DelDOT. The only customer beyond the bridge was SPI Pharma, who had averaged two to three railroad transports a month. As a result of the bridge closure, SPI Pharma began shipping by truck. Three tank cars remained stranded at SPI Pharma. In 2017, DelDOT determined that repairs to the swing bridge would be too costly and the line will be abandoned from Lewes to Cool Spring. Originally the tank cars were to be transported across the swing bridge, but due to the instability of the bridge it was later decided to transport the tank cars by truck across the canal and reassemble them onto the tracks on the other side for them to be hauled by rail to Georgetown. The three tank cars were trucked out of SPI Pharma in November 2017. A train pulled the tank cars out of Lewes on December 15, 2017, ending train service to Lewes.

In October 2016, work began on the Georgetown-Lewes Trail, a rail-with-trail along the railroad right-of-way. In December 2017, the Lewes city council voted in favor of preserving a section of the railroad line between Kings Highway and Adams Avenue. The swing bridge over the Lewes and Rehoboth Canal was removed in 2022. DelDOT retained ownership and railroad rights along the roadbed.

In early 2018, DCLR was informed by the State of Delaware that its contract would not be renewed. The Delmarva Central Railroad won the bid to take over the contract and extended its existing operations to include the DCLR's tracks effective January 1, 2019. DCLR exited the railroad business and sold off its equipment.

== Engine roster ==
Locomotive Number	Model	Location
2	ALCO RS-36	Georgetown, Delaware
19	ALCO T-6	Georgetown, Delaware
23	ALCO RS-1	Georgetown
182	MLW RS-18	Georgetown
4024	GE B23-7	Millsboro, Delaware
4054	GE B23-7	Georgetown
44	GE 44-ton switcher	Georgetown

Note: No. 2 has been put up for sale on the Sterling Rail website, No. 23 was scrapped years ago, No. 44 was sold to a new owner in West Virginia, and a new addition to the roster is No. 1982, a GE 65-ton centercab. By January 2020 DCLR president Dan Herholdt stated that, with the exception of No. 182 receiving power assembly repair, all of the locomotives had either been sold and departed the property or were spoken for.

== Major clients ==
Customer	Location
Baker Petroleum	Milton, Delaware
VFL Industries	Indian River (Delaware)
H & K	Indian River
Delaware Department of Transportation (DelDOT)	Georgetown

Source: Note: There is no spur into Atlantic Concrete and DCLR President Dan Herholdt has stated that the company is not a customer.
