= ALCO 300 =

American diesel–electric switcher

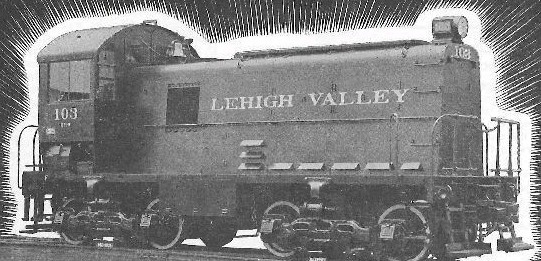
Type and origin
- Power type: Diesel–electric
- Builder: ALCO
- Build date: 1931–1938
- Total produced: 11
Specifications
- Gauge: 4 ft 8 1/2 in (1,435 mm)
- Fuel type: Diesel fuel
- Prime mover: ALCO Model 6-330
- Traction motors: General Electric
Performance figures
- Power output: 300 hp (224 kW)
Career
- Operators: Lehigh Valley Railroad; US Navy; United Fruit Company
- Numbers: 1. 101–103 (Lehigh Valley Railroad)
- Delivered: 1931–1938
- Disposition: All scrapped
- Two locomotives were rebuilt McIntosh & Seymour switchers.

The ALCO 300 was an early diesel–electric switcher locomotive built by the American Locomotive Company (ALCO) of Schenectady, New York between 1931 and 1938.

Following purchase of the engine manufacturer McIntosh & Seymour in 1929, ALCO built a 300 horsepower (220 kW) box cab locomotive. This was the #300, an ALCO demonstrator. The engine used was the Model 330 and GE electrical transmission was used. Another demonstrator #300 was built as an end cab switcher in July 1931 also using General Electric electrical equipment. This unit was sold to the Lehigh Valley Railroad as its #102. A subsequent 300 horsepower (220 kW) end cab switcher was sold to the Lehigh Valley as its #103 in December 1931. A McIntosh and Seymour Box cab Lehigh Valley #125 was rebuilt with an ALCO 330 engine in 1931 and then renumbered Lehigh Valley #101.

Three more end cab 300 horsepower (220 kW) switchers were built in 1932 for stock demonstrators, but they were not sold until 1935. An additional two 300 horsepower (220 kW) end cab switchers were built in 1935. All these stock units and the two new end cab switchers were sold to the US Navy in 1935. The final two 300 horsepower (220 kW) end cab switchers were built in 1938 for the United Fruit Company's narrow gauge railroad in Panama.

None have been preserved.

== See also ==
- List of ALCO diesel locomotives
- List of MLW diesel locomotives
