= ALCO S-6 =

20th century diesel-electric locomotive

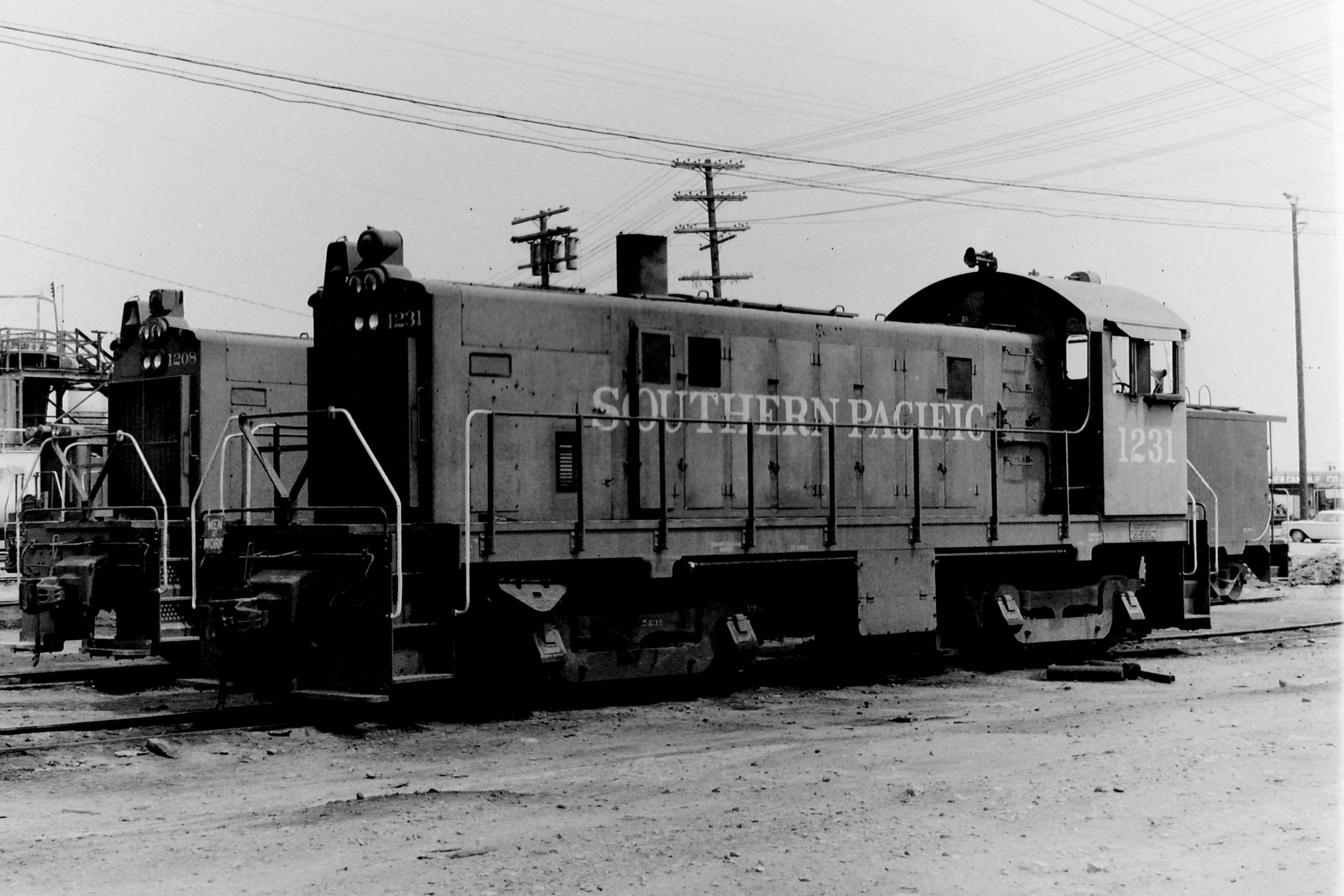
- SP No. 1231 at El Centro, California, in 1970
Type and origin
- Power type: Diesel
- Builder: ALCO
- Model: S-6
- Build date: May 1955–December 1960
- Total produced: 126+
Specifications
- Configuration
  - AAR: B-B
  - UIC: Bo′Bo′
- Gauge: 4 ft 8 1/2 in (1,435 mm)
- Length: 45 ft 5 in (13.84 m)
- Width: 10 ft (3.05 m)
- Height: 14 ft 8 in (4.47 m)
- Loco weight: 230,000 lb (104.3 tonnes)
- Fuel capacity: 635 US gal (2,400 L; 529 imp gal)
- Lubricant cap.: 140 US gal (530 L; 120 imp gal)
- Coolant cap.: 110 US gal (420 L; 92 imp gal)
- Sandbox cap.: 26 cu ft (0.74 m^{3})
- Prime mover: ALCO 6-251A or B
- RPM range: 375–1000 rpm
- Engine type: Four-stroke diesel
- Generator: GE GT-533 (or GE GT-584)
- Traction motors: 4 × GE 731 (GE 752 optional)
- Cylinders: Straight 6
- Cylinder size: 9 in × 10 1/2 in (229 mm × 267 mm)
Performance figures
- Maximum speed: 60 mph (97 km/h)
- Power output: 900 hp (670 kW)
Career
- Locale: United States, Mexico

The Alco S-6 (specification DL 430) was a diesel–electric switcher locomotive constructed by ALCO of Schenectady, New York; a total of 126 locomotives were built between May 1955 and December 1960. The S-6 was an improved version of the earlier S-5.

== Design ==
Visually indistinguishable from the S-5, the S-6 used an ALCO 251A or 251B prime mover rated at 900 horsepower (670 kW). The locomotive rode on two-axle AAR trucks, giving a B-B wheel arrangement. ALCO produced a cow–calf variant for the Oliver Iron Mining Company designated SB-8/SSB-9, two sets were produced of this version.

== Original owners ==
Image	Railroad	Quantity	Road Number	Notes
	Allied Chemical Company	1	110	
	ARMCO Steel	1	1202	
	B. Perini & Sons Construction Company	1	101	to Upper Merion and Plymouth Railroad 101
	Belt Railway of Chicago	1	420	
	Ferrocarril Chihuahua al Pacífico	1	60	Renumbered 106 to the Ferrocarriles Unidos del Sureste (FUS) Renumbered 105 then to NdeM renumberd 5302
	Cia Fundidora de Hierro y Acero	3	1–3	
	Ferrocarril del Pacífico	24	701–723	
	Ferrocarriles Nacionales de México	1	5300	
	Northern Pacific Railway	1	750	to Burlington Northern Railroad 950
	Ohio River Company (ORCo)	1	56	
	Republic Steel	3	153, 317, 318	
	Secretaria de Comunicaciones de Obras Publicas (SCOP)	3	7133-1, 2, 3	to Ferrocarril del Sureste (same numbers)
	Sheffield Steel	2	15, 16	
	Southern Pacific Railroad	70	1033–1082, 4634–4645	renumbered 1200–1257, 1270–1281
	South Buffalo Railway	6	40–45	
	Tennessee Copper	1	107	
	Upper Merion and Plymouth Railroad	1	61	
	U.S. Pipe and Foundry	1	38	
	Columbia Geneva Steel	1	1	
	Western Maryland Railway	2	151, 152	
	Ferrocarriles Unidos de Yucatán	1	301	

== In popular culture ==
- In Back to the Future Part III, two double headed S-6 locomotives destroyed the DeLorean time machine, when it returned to 1985. The lead engine is currently in the possession of the Virginia and Truckee Railroad

== See also ==
- List of ALCO diesel locomotives
- List of MLW diesel locomotives
