= ALCO Century 430 =

3000-hp 4-axle diesel-electric locomotive

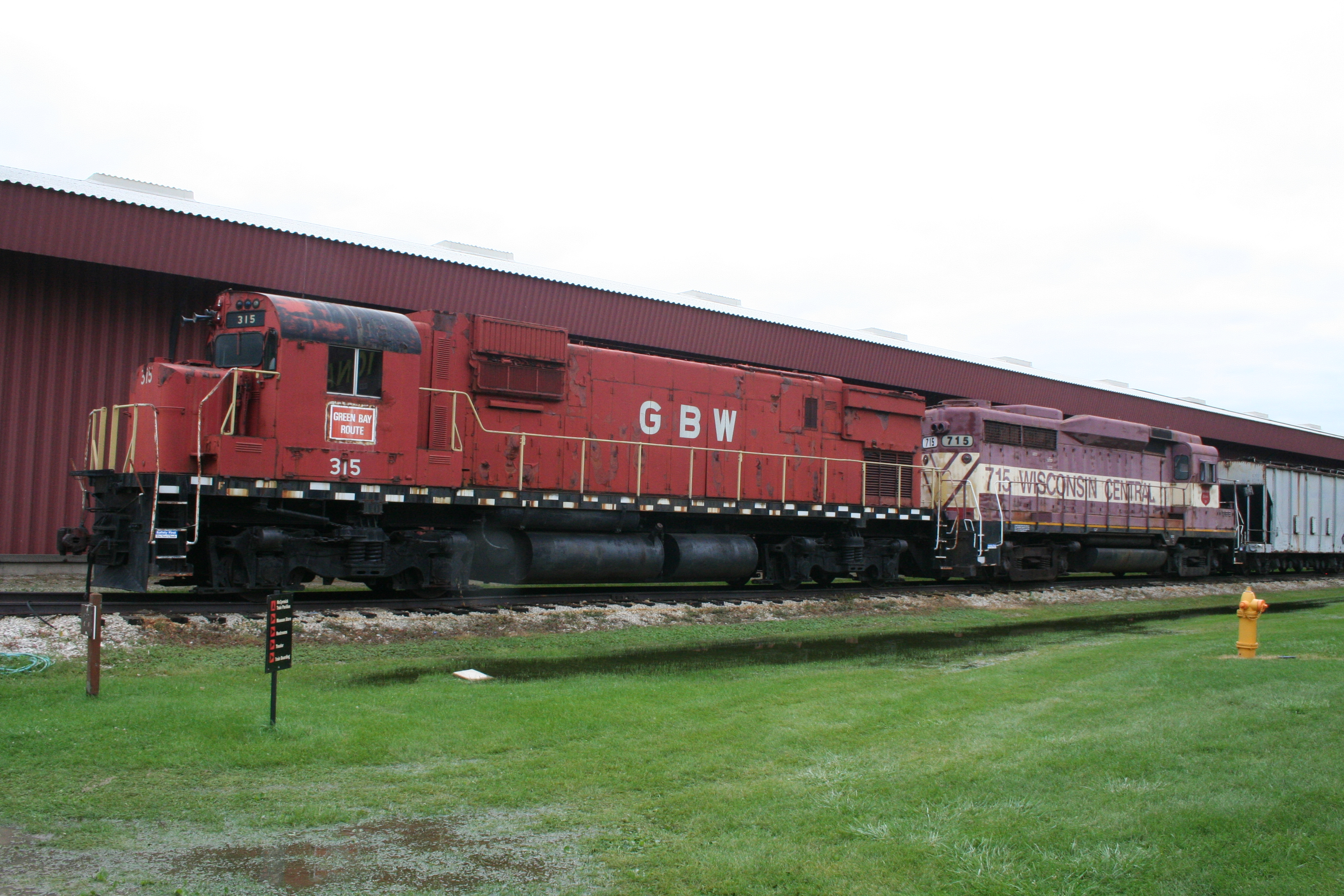
- Green Bay and Western Railroad 315, an Alco C430 at the National Railroad Museum, Green Bay, Wisconsin.
Type and origin
- Power type: Diesel-electric
- Builder: ALCO
- Model: Century 430
- Build date: July 1966 – February 1968
- Total produced: 16
Specifications
- Configuration
  - AAR: B-B
- Gauge: 4 ft 8 1/2 in (1,435 mm) standard gauge
- Prime mover: ALCO 16-251E
- Alternator: GTA 9
Performance figures
- Power output: 3,000 hp (2,237 kW)
Career
- Disposition: 4 preserved, remainder scrapped

The ALCO Century 430 is a four-axle, 3,000 hp (2,237 kW) diesel-electric locomotive. 16 were built between July 1966 and February 1968. Cataloged as a part of ALCO's 'Century' line of locomotives, the C430 was an upgraded version of the C425 model. Since 1992, five C430s have remained in existence.

== Original owners ==
Owner	Image	Quantity	Numbers	Notes
	Green Bay and Western Railroad	1	315	Preserved
	New York Central Railroad	10	2050–2059	WNYP 430, 431 and 432 (2050, 2053 and 2054) now owned by the Adirondack Railroad Preservation Society, 433 operating on WYNP roster.
	Reading Railroad	2	5211-5212	Scrapped by Conrail in 1981
	Seaboard Coast Line Railroad	3	1275–1277	Ex. ALCo (demonstrators) 430-1 to 430-3

== Preservation ==
- Green Bay & Western 315 is preserved at the National Railroad Museum in Green Bay, Wisconsin.
- Western New York and Pennsylvania 430, 431 and 432 (formerly New York Central 2050, 2053 and 2054) have been acquired by the Adirondack Railway Preservation Society. 430 was acquired in April 2025, while 431 and 432 were acquired that August. All three units are operating on the Adirondack Railroad.

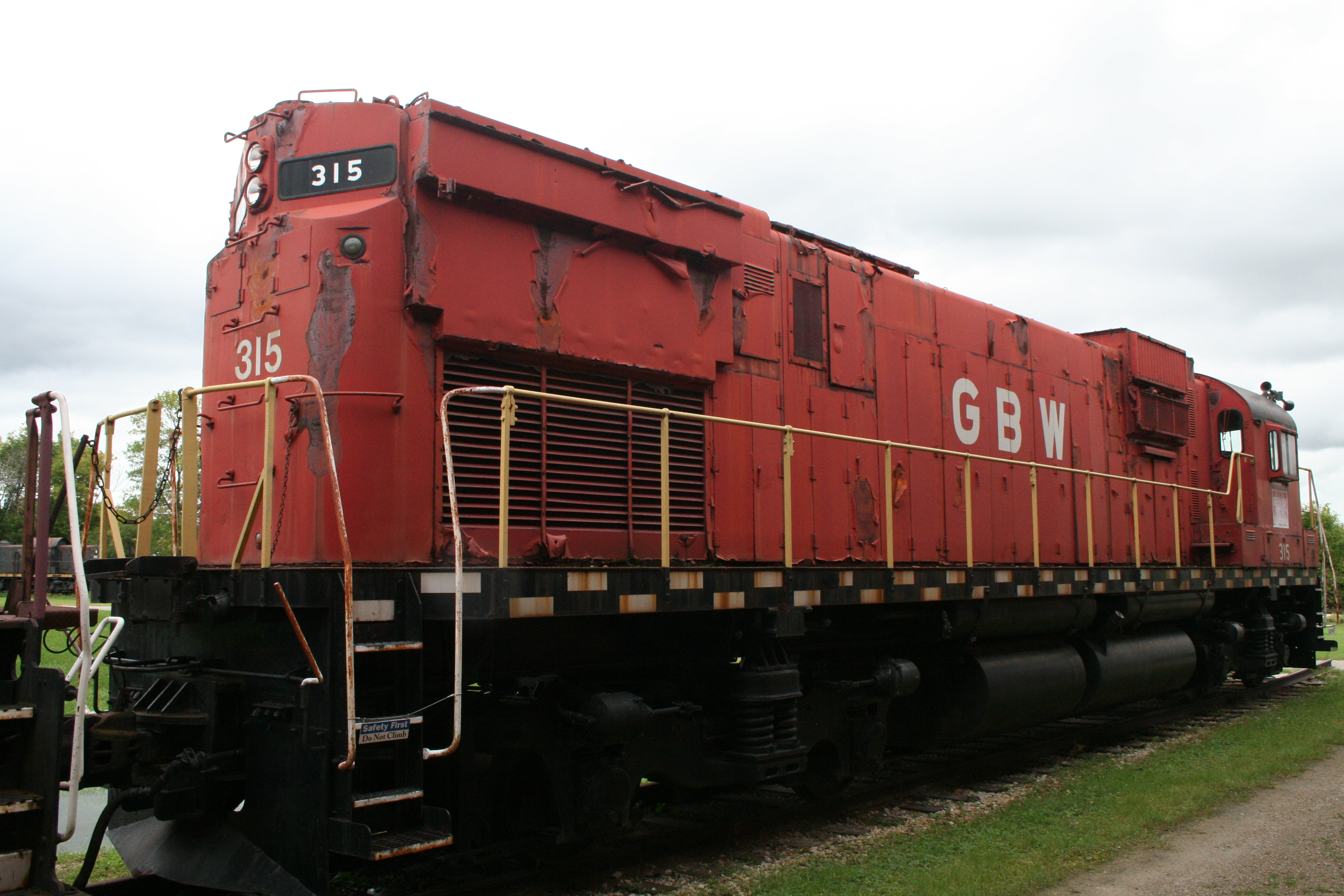
Rear of GBW 315
