= ALCO RSD-16 =

Diesel locomotive

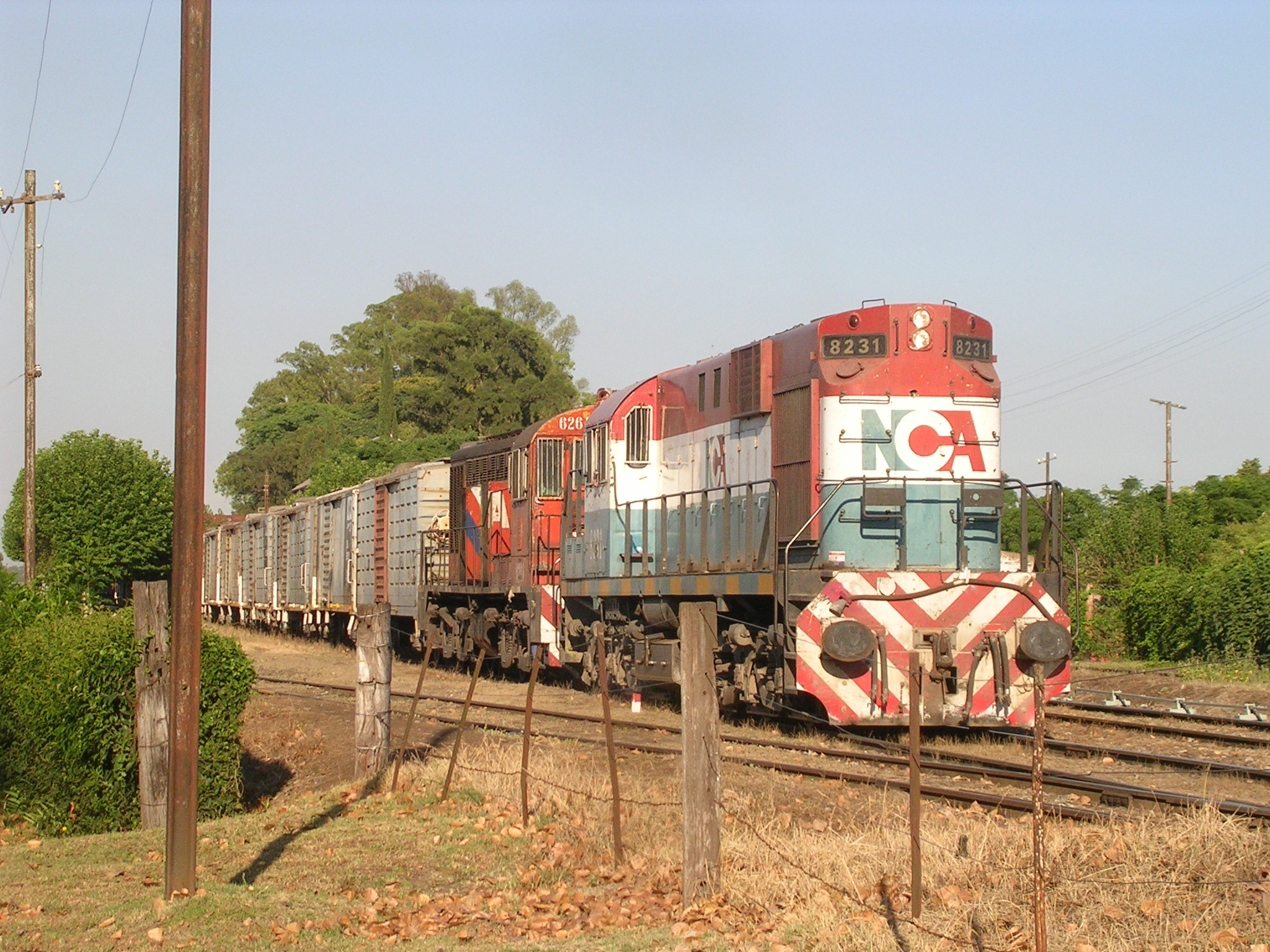
- ALCO RSD-16 on the NCA (Nuevo Central Argentino) railroad.
Type and origin
- Power type: Diesel-electric
- Builder: American Locomotive Company
- Model: RSD-16
- Build date: 1957-1959
- Total produced: 130
Specifications
- Configuration
  - AAR: Co'Co'
- Gauge: 1,676 mm (5 ft 6 in)
- Trucks: C-C
- Wheelbase: 11 ft 3 in (3.43 m)
- Length: 55 ft 11.75 in (17.06 m)
- Loco weight: 108 tonnes (106 long tons; 119 short tons)
- Prime mover: ALCO 251-B
- Traction motors: GE 731
- Cylinders: V12 cylinders
- Loco brake: Westinghouse 6-SLAV
- Train brakes: Air or Vacuum
Performance figures
- Maximum speed: 122 km/h
- Power output: 1950 horsepower
Career
- Locale: Argentina

The ALCO RSD-16 is a diesel locomotive, built by American Locomotive Company. The engine weights approximately 108 tonnes (106.3 imperial tons). The locomotive is used exclusively on railroads in Argentina having been built for use on the broad gauge routes in the country.

== History ==
In 1956 American Locomotive Company (ALCO), responded to an order for 130 diesel electric locomotives for use in the Republic of Argentina. Three contracts were signed for the Ferrocarril Domingo Faustino Sarmiento, Ferrocarril General Bartolomé Mitre, and the Ferrocarril General San Martín. The engines were built at ALCO's Schenectady, New York factory in 1957, with the finished locomotives for export shipped from 1958 to 1959. The locomotives' electrical systems were made using General Electric components, and the air brake system was built using Westinghouse parts. The ALCO RSD-16 was one of the first North American built locomotives to be used in large quantities in Argentina.

The 30 locomotives that Ferrocarril Nacional Domingo Faustino Sarmiento owned were not well suited for that line due to a lack of on-line traffic. From 1964 to 1967, 20 of those engines were leased to the San Martín line although they would later return to the Sarmiento. During the same era, several engines from the Mitre and San Martín were loaned to the Ferrocarril Nacional General Roca where they were put in use between Mar del Plata and San Carlos de Bariloche.

During the 1970s the RSD-16's were heavily used in services between Córdoba, Rosario, Mendoza, Santa Rosa, and the resorts in Mar del Plata.

In 1978, one engine was rebuilt with a FIAT A-230-12 diesel engine replacing the original ALCO 251 engine block. In 1980/1981, 16 other locomotives were rebuilt with 251-C MLW engines imported from Canada. Materfer would later use shop space at an Electro-Motive Diesel plant in Argentina to build new engine blocks for use in the RSD-16's.
