= ALCO DH643 =

Twin-engine diesel-hydraulic locomotive

ALCO C-643DH
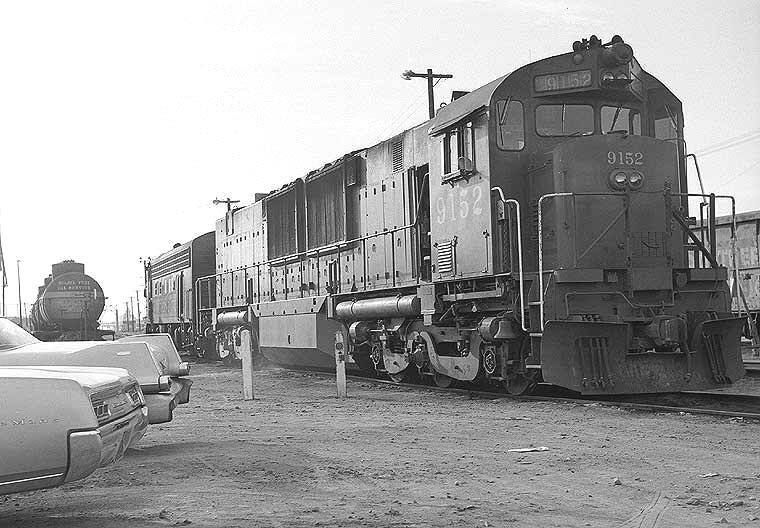
- Southern Pacific #9152, formerly #9020.
Type and origin
- Power type: Diesel-hydraulic
- Builder: American Locomotive Company (ALCO)
- Order number: S-3374
- Serial number: S-3374-01 – S-3374-03
- Model: DH-643
- Build date: September 1964
- Total produced: 3
Specifications
- Configuration
  - AAR: C-C
  - UIC: C′C′
- Gauge: 4 ft 8 1/2 in (1,435 mm)
- Length: 75 ft 10 in (23.11 m)
- Loco weight: 378,000 lb (171,000 kg)
- Prime mover: ALCO 12-251C, (x 2)
- Engine type: V12 Four-stroke diesel, (x 2)
- Aspiration: Turbocharger
- Displacement: 8,016 cu in (131.36 L)
- Cylinders: 12 (x 2)
- Cylinder size: 9 by 10 1/2 inches (229 mm × 267 mm)
- Transmission: Voith hydraulic
- Loco brake: Straight air
- Train brakes: Air
Performance figures
- Maximum speed: 77 mph (124 km/h)
- Power output: 4,300 hp (3,200 kW)
- Tractive effort: 95,000 lbf (422.58 kN)
Career
- Operators: Southern Pacific Railroad
- Numbers: 9018–9020 (later 9150–9152; final 9800-9802)
- Locale: North America
- Scrapped: 1973

The ALCO C-643DH, also known as the Century 643DH, was a twin-engine diesel-hydraulic locomotive, the first diesel-hydraulic road switcher built in the United States. It had a C-C wheel arrangement and generated 4,300 horsepower (3,200 kW). Only three were built, all for Southern Pacific Railroad in 1964 (#9018–#9020). The Alco C-643DHs joined 21 Krauss-Maffei ML-4000 diesel-hydraulics already on the Southern Pacific's roster. They spent most of their service lives in the flat San Joaquin Valley in California.

Dissatisfaction over the poor performance of diesel-hydraulic locomotives, as well as their use of foreign-made components (the hydraulic transmission was of German Voith design), eventually led Southern Pacific to sell the three units for scrap in 1973. None were preserved.

== Original owners ==
Image	Railroad	Quantity	Road numbers	Notes
	Southern Pacific Railroad	3	9018–9020	renumbered 9150–9152

== See also ==
- List of ALCO diesel locomotives
- ALCO Century 855
