= ALCO Century 630 =

Model of American 3000hp Co′Co′ diesel-electric locomotives

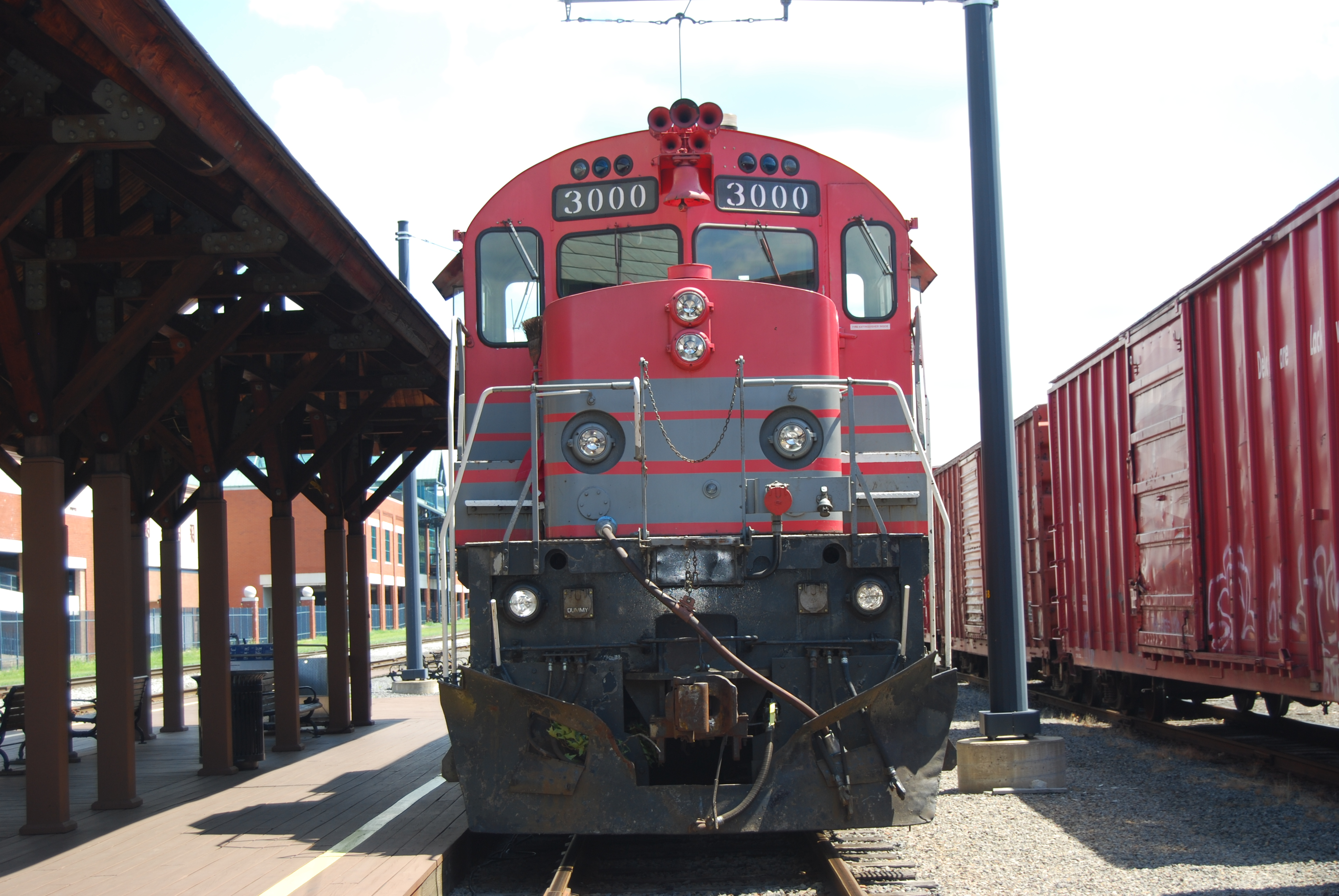
- DL #3000, a MLW M630, at the Steamtown National Historic Site in 2008.
Type and origin
- Power type: Diesel
- Builder: ALCO; Montreal Locomotive Works
- Model: Century 630
- Build date: 1965 – 1968
- Total produced: 133
Specifications
- Configuration
  - AAR: C-C
- Gauge: 4 ft 8 1/2 in (1,435 mm) standard gauge
- Prime mover: ALCO 16-251E
- Alternator: GTA 9
Performance figures
- Power output: 3,000 hp (2.2 MW)
Career
- Locale: North America

The ALCO Century 630 is a model of six-axle, 3,000 hp (2.2 MW) diesel-electric locomotive built by the American Locomotive Company (ALCO) between 1965 and 1967. It used the ALCO 251 prime mover. 77 were built: 3 for Atlantic Coast Line Railroad, 4 for Chesapeake and Ohio Railway, 8 for Louisville and Nashville Railroad, 10 (with high noses) for Norfolk and Western Railway, 15 for Pennsylvania Railroad, 12 for the Reading Company, 15 for Southern Pacific Railroad and 10 for Union Pacific Railroad.

Montreal Locomotive Works produced a C630M variant of the C630, with 4 for British Columbia Railway, 8 for Canadian Pacific Railway and 44 for Canadian National.

After Alco ceased operations, MLW M630s were built by Montreal Locomotive Works from 1969 to 1973: 29 for CPR, 26 for BCR, and 20 for Ferrocarriles Nacional de Mexico (N de M). Eight of the BCR locomotives were designated M630(W) and were built with a wide-nosed cab, known as the "Canadian" or "safety" cab. These models, along with the nearly identical MLW M636, had more in common with the ALCO C636 than the C630, and all MLW versions rode on high-adhesion trucks cast by Dofasco.

In January 1975, four Chesapeake and Ohio Railway locomotives were sold to Robe River Iron Associates in the Pilbara region of Western Australia. One was destroyed in an accident in February 1979, with the remaining three rebuilt by A Goninan & Co, Perth as CM40-8s in the early 1990s.

Two M630s are still in service with the Delaware-Lackawanna Railroad.

== Preservation ==
- Norfolk and Western #1135 is preserved at the Virginia Museum of Transportation in Roanoke, Virginia.
- Reading #5308 is preserved at the Reading Railroad Heritage Museum in Hamburg, Pennsylvania
- Union Pacific #2907 is preserved at the Arkansas Railroad Museum in Pine Bluff, Arkansas.
- Canadian Pacific #4563 is preserved at the Canadian Railway Museum (Exporail) in Quebec, Canada.
- Western New York and Pennsylvania #630 (ex Canadian Pacific #4500 C630M) is preserved at the French Creek Valley Railroad Historical Society in Meadville, Pennsylvania.

== See also ==
- List of ALCO diesel locomotives
- List of MLW diesel locomotives
