= ALCO Century 425 =

2500-hp 4-axle diesel-electric locomotive

ALCO C425
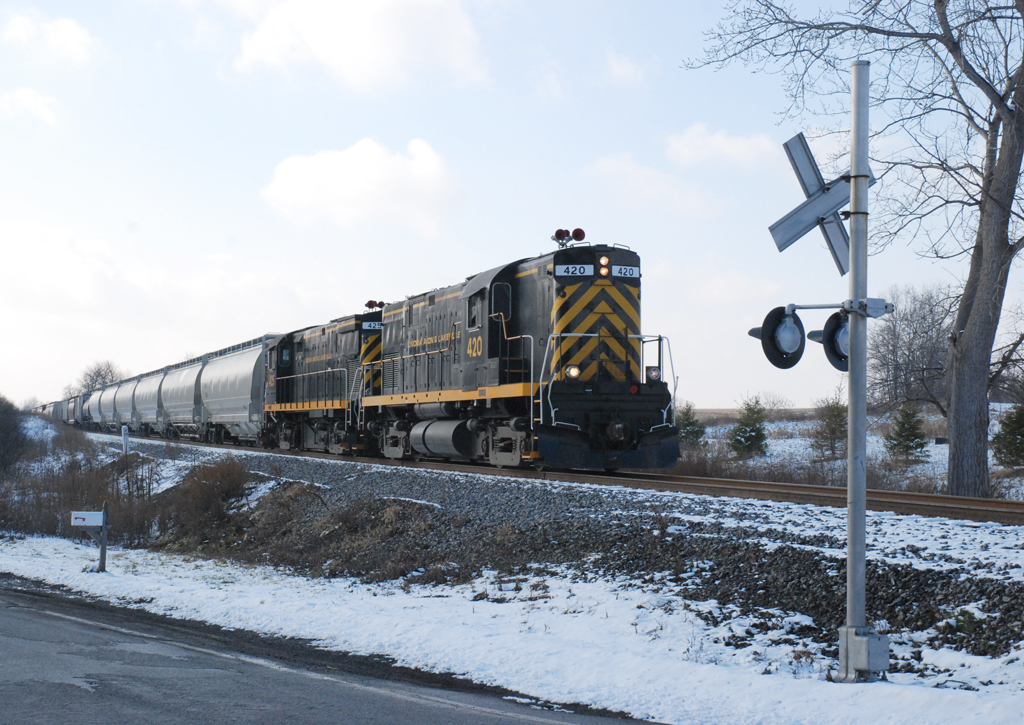
- Northbound Livonia, Avon and Lakeville Road Freight in 2007
Type and origin
- Power type: Diesel-electric
- Builder: ALCO Products
- Model: C425
- Build date: October 1964 – December 1966
- Total produced: 91
Specifications
- Configuration
  - AAR: B-B
- Gauge: 4 ft 8 1/2 in (1,435 mm) standard gauge
- Trucks: AAR type B
- Length: 59 ft 4 in (18.08 m)
- Width: 10 ft (3.05 m)
- Height: 14 ft 5 in (4.39 m)
- Loco weight: 280,000 lb (130 t)
- Fuel capacity: 1,660 US gal (6,280 L)
- Prime mover: ALCO 251
- Engine type: Four-stroke diesel
- Aspiration: Turbocharger
- Displacement: 8,256 cu in (135.3 L)
- Generator: GE DC 5GT-598-D2
- Traction motors: (4) GE 5GE-752-E50
- Cylinders: 16
- Cylinder size: 9 in × 10.5 in (229 mm × 267 mm)
- Loco brake: Straight air,
- Train brakes: Air, Dynamic
Performance figures
- Maximum speed: 70 mph (113 km/h)
- Power output: 2,500 hp (1,860 kW)
- Tractive effort: 40,425 lbf (179.8 kN)
Career
- Locale: North America
- Disposition: Several in service on shortline railroads

The ALCO Century 425 is a four-axle, 2,500 hp (1,860 kW) diesel-electric locomotive. 91 were built between October 1964 and December 1966.

Cataloged as part of ALCO's "Century" line of locomotives, the C425 is an upgraded version of the C424. The C425 employs the same main generator found in General Electric's U25B model.

== Original owners ==
Image	Owner	Quantity	Numbers	Notes
	Chicago and North Western Railway	4	401–404	
	Erie Lackawanna Railway	12	2451–2462	to BC Rail 801–812
	New York, New Haven and Hartford Railroad	10	2550–2559	to Penn Central 2450–2459, then Conrail, same numbers
	Norfolk and Western Railway	18	1000–1016, 1011 (2nd)	1000–1006 ordered by Wabash Railroad
	Pennsylvania Railroad	31	2416–2446	
	Spokane, Portland and Seattle Railway	16	310–317, 320–327	to Burlington Northern 4250, 4252–4265

== See also ==
- List of ALCO diesel locomotives
