= ALCO S-5 =

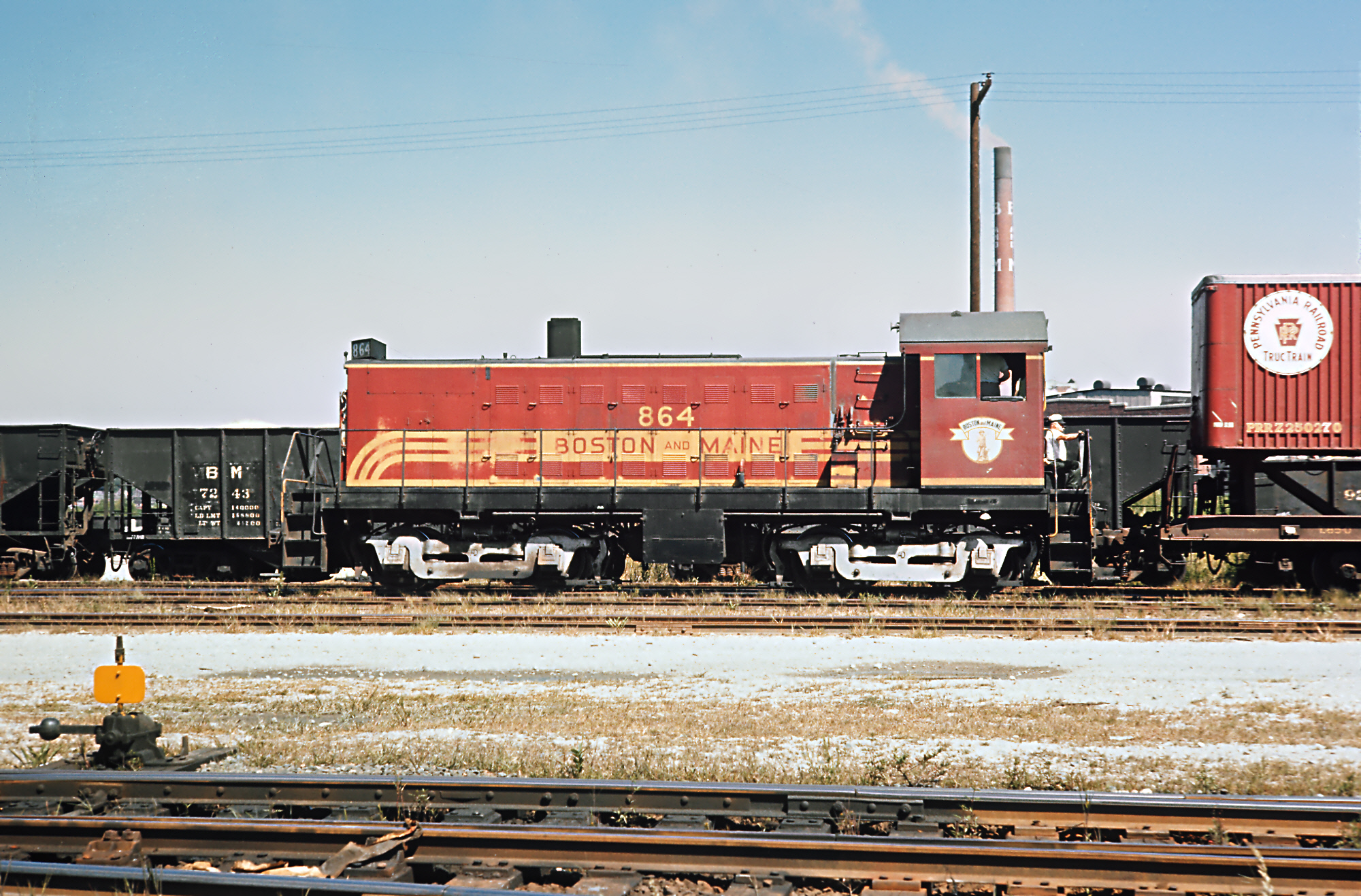
- B&M S-5 #864 in Boston in September 1965
Type and origin
- Power type: Diesel-electric
- Builder: ALCO
- Serial number: 80915–80921
- Model: S-5 (Specification DL421 and DL421A)
- Build date: June 1954
- Total produced: 7
Specifications
- Configuration
  - AAR: B-B
- Gauge: 4 ft 8 1/2 in (1,435 mm)
- Prime mover: ALCO 6-251
- Cylinders: Straight 6
Performance figures
- Power output: 800 hp (600 kW)
Career
- Operators: Boston and Maine Railroad
- Numbers: 860-865, 909
- Locale: United States
- Disposition: 1 preserved, remainder scrapped

The Alco S-5 (DL 421A) was a diesel-electric switcher locomotive rated at 800 horsepower (600 kW), that rode on two-axle trucks, having a B-B wheel arrangement.

This was Alco's second attempt to build a replacement 251-engined switcher to replace the 539-engined S-3 and S-4. Only seven were sold. The demonstrator unit was ALCO specification DL421 and the six production units were ALCO specification DL421A. Alco fitted the 251A engine in its replacement, the S-6 with power output raised by 100 horsepower (75 kW).

== Original owners ==
Image	Railroad	Quantity	Road numbers	Notes
	Alco (demonstrator)	1	909	to Island Creek Fuel and Transportation Company #102
	Boston and Maine Railroad	6	860–865	

== See also ==
- List of ALCO diesel locomotives
- List of MLW diesel locomotives
