= Dominion Engineering Works =

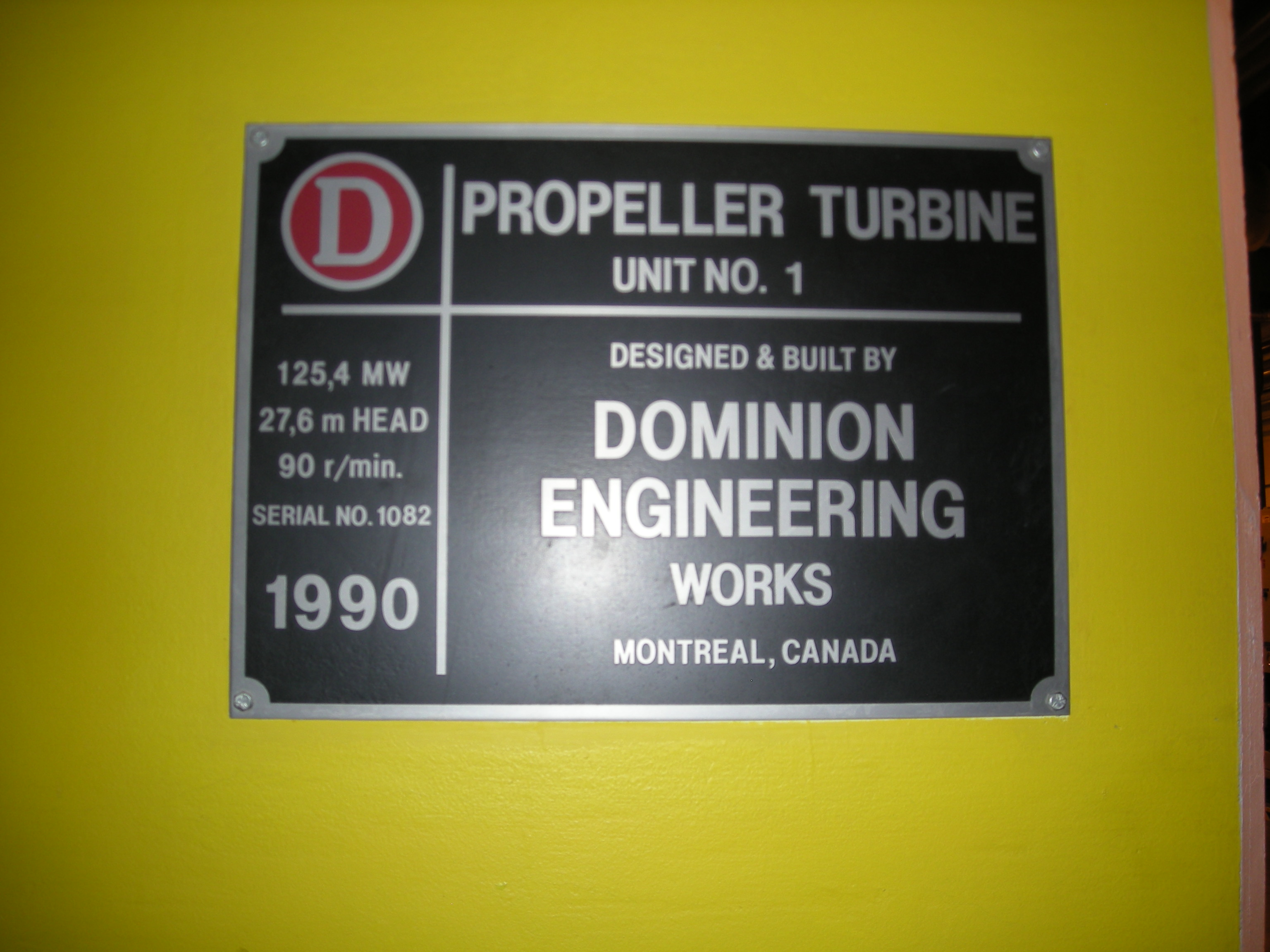
- Industry: Industrial processing
- Founded: 1882
- Headquarters: Montreal, Canada
- Products: Turnkey equipment for hydropower plants
- Parent: Canadian General Electric Company Limited
- Divisions: Hydro Power

Dominion Engineering Works was a company with headquarters in Montreal, Quebec, Canada.
