= ALCO RS-32 =

2000-hp diesel-electric locomotive

ALCO RS-32 (Southern Pacific)
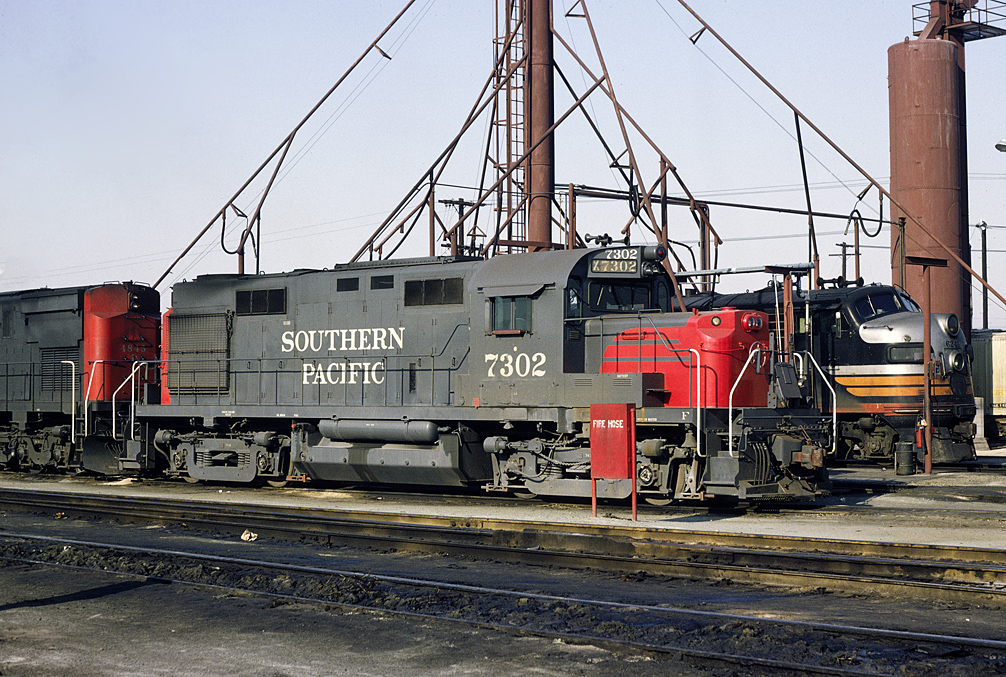
- Southern Pacific 7302 in February 1966
Type and origin
- Power type: Diesel-electric
- Builder: ALCO
- Model: RS-32, specification DL-721
- Build date: June 1961 - June 1962
- Total produced: 35
Specifications
- Configuration
  - AAR: B-B
- Gauge: 4 ft 8 1/2 in (1,435 mm)
- Prime mover: ALCO 12-251C
- Cylinders: V12
- Cylinder size: 9 in × 10.5 in (229 mm × 267 mm)
- Transmission: Electric
Performance figures
- Power output: 2,000 hp (1,500 kW)
Career
- Locale: United States

Designated as a "DL721" by ALCO, the 2,000 hp RS-32 was intended to compete with EMD's GP20 and GE's U25B locomotives. Only 35 units were produced, with 25 units ordered by New York Central in 1961 and 10 units by Southern Pacific in 1962. New York Central’s RS-32s were commonly seen in both road and local freight assignments. Southern Pacific's units were initially used in road service, but later settled into local freight service in San Francisco's "commute" territory. Here they were sometimes called upon to rescue stalled commuter trains. They later migrated across the system, ending their SP careers in Texas during the late 1970s with various other ALCo models.

== Original owners ==
| Image | Railroad | Quantity | Road numbers | Notes |
|---|---|---|---|---|
| | New York Central Railroad | 25 | 8020-8044 | renumbered 2020-2044, |
| | Southern Pacific Railroad | 10 | 7300-7309 | renumbered 4000-4009 |
| | Total | 35 | | |

== Surviving RS32s ==
| Original owner | Owner | Road number | Status |
|---|---|---|---|
| New York Central Railroad | Arkansas & Missouri | 30, ex A&M 42, ex-NYC, PC, CR 2031 (nee-NYC 8031) | Operating |
| New York Central Railroad | Genesee Valley Transportation (DL) | 2035, ex-DL 212, ex NYC, PC, CR 2035 (nee NYC-8035) | Operating (freight) |
| Southern Pacific Railroad | Genesee Valley Transportation (DL) | 2002, ex-DL 211, ex-SP 4002 (nee-7302) | Operating (freight) |
| Southern Pacific Railroad | Southern California Railway Museum | 4009 (nee-SP 7309) | Acquired from Fillmore and Western Railway |
| Southern Pacific Railroad | Pacific Southwest Railway Museum | 4004 (nee-7304) | Un-restored/Serviceable |

== See also ==
- List of ALCO diesel locomotives
