= Burlington Junction Railway =

Railroad in midwestern U.S.

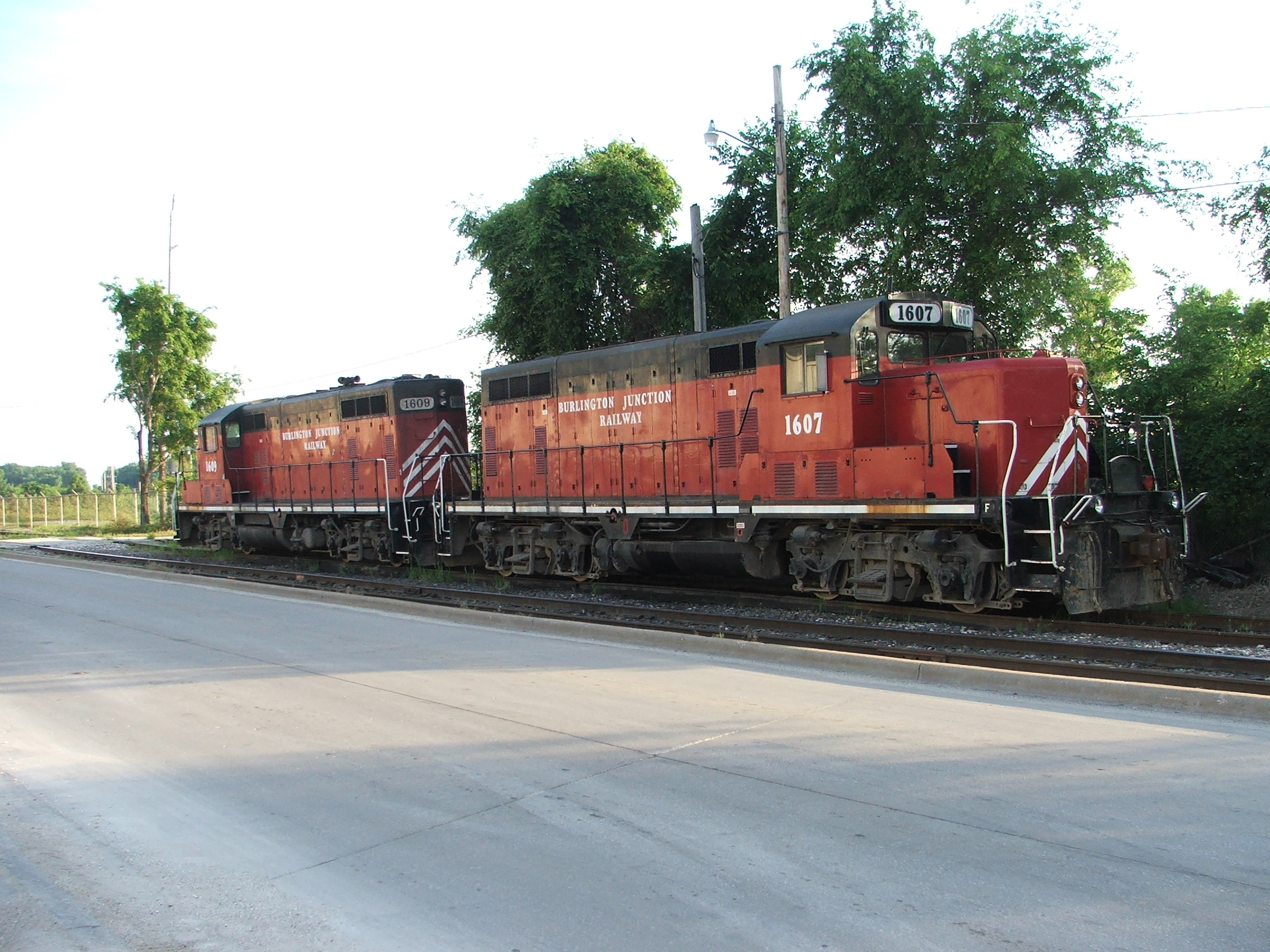
- BJRY Nos. 1607 and 1609 in Quincy, Illinois.

Overview
- Headquarters: Burlington, Iowa
- Reporting mark: BJRY
- Dates of operation: 1985–present

Other
- Website: www.bjryrail.com

The Burlington Junction Railway (reporting mark BJRY) is a Class III short line railroad. Chartered in 1985, it provides short freight hauling, switching operations, locomotive repair, and transloading services.

In 2010, it transloaded more than 3,000 carloads. Typical commodity types transported include chemicals and fertilizer. The BJRY's primary interchange partner is the BNSF Railway.

The BJRY power fleet currently numbers twenty locomotives. Other Burlington Junction Railway assets include 50,000 feet (15,000 m) of warehouse space, as well as various types of bulk material handling equipment such as augers.

The BJRY originally operated on the southernmost 3 miles (4.8 km) of the former Burlington, Cedar Rapids and Northern Railway mainline in Burlington, Iowa, which had been abandoned by the Chicago, Rock Island and Pacific Railroad. By 2010, it had expanded to operate seven local industrial railroads:

- Burlington, Iowa (Switch Carrier / Connection to BNSF)

Trackage: 3 miles (4.8 km)

- LeMars, Iowa (Switch Carrier / Connection to CN)
- Mt. Pleasant, Iowa (Switch Carrier / Connection to BNSF)

Trackage: 1-mile (1.6 km)

- Ottumwa, Iowa (Switch Carrier / Connection to BNSF)

Trackage: 1-mile (1.6 km)

- Quincy, Illinois (Switch Carrier / Connection to BNSF & and Norfolk Southern )

Trackage: 7 miles (11 km)

- Rochelle, Illinois (Trackage owned by the City of Rochelle / Connection to BNSF & UP)
- Montgomery, Illinois (Switch Carrier / Connection to BNSF)
- Fenton/Valley Park, Missouri (Switch Carrier / Connection to BNSF)
