= ALCO 251 =

Family of diesel engines

The ALCO 251 is a 4-stroke diesel engine that was developed by the American Locomotive Company to replace its 244 and 539 engines. The 251 was developed to be used in diesel locomotives, as a marine power plant in ships, and as a stationary power generator.

== Development ==
The model 251 engine design was initiated in 1949 and, like the 244 engine, it had a bore (cylinder diameter) of 9 inches (229 mm), and a stroke of 10.5 inches (267 mm). Its designation combines Alco's identifier for that bore and stroke - 2 - with the year its design was approved for laboratory testing - 1951. Chief Engineer of Diesel Engine Design, Paul Vaughan, designed the 251 to improve upon the major weaknesses of the 244. A wet block design was used to overcome severe thermal differences which existed in the dry block 244. The welded block and base was kept, as was the four-point mounting. New in the 251 has an intercooler for the turbocharger, which minimized temperature differentials and also benefited performance. Many small improvements were made to the crankshaft, bearings, pistons, injectors and camshafts.

To avoid the problems caused by rushing the 244 into production, the 251 was put through an extensive testing process. The first 251 engines installed in locomotives for testing were inline-6 designs of 800 hp (597 kW). A simple, safe design, it also offered a direct replacement for the aged 539, which was still used in switch engines and the ALCO RS-1 road switcher. Like the 539, it was produced in Auburn, New York. In August 1951, Alco built the ALCO DL420 test unit with a six-cylinder 800-horsepower 251 engine. Ten GE 78-ton units followed in mid-1953 and were exported to the Consolidated Railroads of Cuba. The following year seven ALCO S-5, a demonstrator and six units for the Boston and Maine were built. Two GE X3341s were built in 1954 for the White Pass and Yukon Route with the 251 engines. In mid-1954 the Lehigh Valley Railroad supplied an FA-2 and FB-2 for installation of test 12-cylinder 251A engines. The Lehigh Valley units were tested for a year.

In 1954, the 251 went into production with the inline-6 at Auburn, New York. The next year production of the V-12 followed at Auburn, New York - where the 539 engine was built - and a V-16 version built at Schenectady, New York, replacing the 244. Engine manufacturing at Schenectady was terminated in 1962, after which all non-Canadian production was moved to Auburn. Engines for A. E. Goodwin, Alco's Australian licensee, were built at Auburn or Schenectady; engines for Montreal Locomotive Works were, until 1961, assembled by MLW using parts supplied by Auburn and Schenectady. After that date, they were built under licence in Canada by the Dominion Engineering Works. Between 1974–1994, Romania's UCM Reșița made 6,8,12&16-cylinder R251 licensed engines for diesel-electric locomotives (CFR Classes 66/67/70/71 and CFR Class 61), ships propulsion, and intervention stationary generator sets.

== Power generation ==
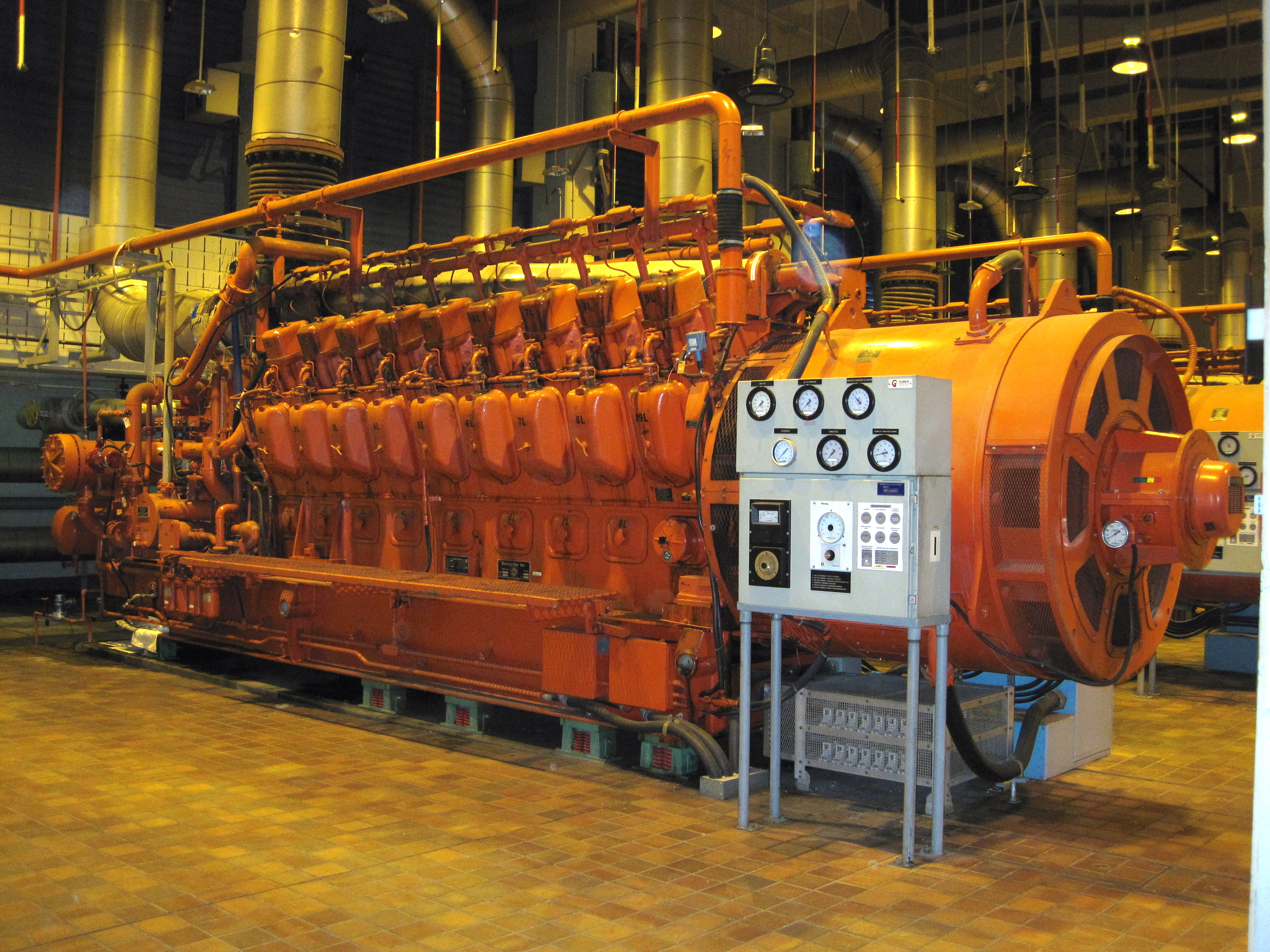
ALCO 18-251 V18 engine used as a backup generator at a wastewater plant in Montreal.

The inline-6 designs of 800 hp (597 kW) version of the 251 engine replaced the 539 engine in 1954 in Alco's low-end line of power generation packages. The 244 engine was still used in higher-end power generation packages until it too was replaced by 251-engined power generation equipment in 1956.

A pair of Alco 251C engines is also used for powering the 6,000,000 lb (2,721,554 kg) NASA Crawler Transporter that transport rockets and their platforms from the Vehicle Assembly Building to the Launch Complex 39.

Ultimately a refined and successful design, the 251 outlived Alco. For a time it was built in Canada by Montreal Locomotive Works. As of November 2025, Fairbanks Morse still lists the 251 on its website for power generation.

== North American locomotive uses ==
| Engine type | Power (hp) | Locomotive(s) |
|---|---|---|
| inline-6 251A | 800 | S-5, GE 78 Ton, GE X3341. |
| inline-6 251B | 900 | S-6., SB-8/SSB-9. |
| inline-6 251B | 1,000 | T-6. DL531. DL532 |
| inline-6 251C | 1,000 | S-13, RS-23. |
| inline-6 251D | 1,200 | DL535E. |
| V-8 251D | 1,500 | C-415. |
| V-12 251B | 1,800 | RS-11, RSD-12, RS-18, RS-36, FPA-4, FPB-4. |
| V-12 251C | 2,000 | RS-32, C420, DH643, M-420, HR-412. |
| V-12 251E | 2,400 | M-424 |
| V-16 251B | 2,400 | RS-27, RSD-15, RSD-17, C-424. |
| V-16 251C | 2,500 | C-425. |
| V-16 251C | 2,750 | C-628, C-855, C-855B. |
| V-16 251E | 3,000 | C-430, C-630, M-630. |
| V-16 251E | 3,200 | HR-616. |
| V-16 251F | 3,600 | C636, M-636. |
| V-16 251F | 3,700 | LRC-2, LRC-3. |
| V-18 251F | 4,000 | M-640. |

== Marine uses ==
- Martha L. Black-class icebreakers built in 1985-1986, 3 × V16-251F per ship, 8,847 hp
- CCGS Hudson research vessel built 1963, 4 x V16-251B, 8,675 hp (Note, cited link misidentifies engines as ALCO 251D)
- United States Coast Guard Famous-class medium endurance cutters, launched 1980-1988, 2 x 18V-251E per ship, 7,200 bhp
- United States Coast Guard Reliance-class medium endurance cutters, launched 1964-1969, 2 x 251B per ship, 5,000 bhp
