= ALCO RS-36 =

Diesel-electric locomotive

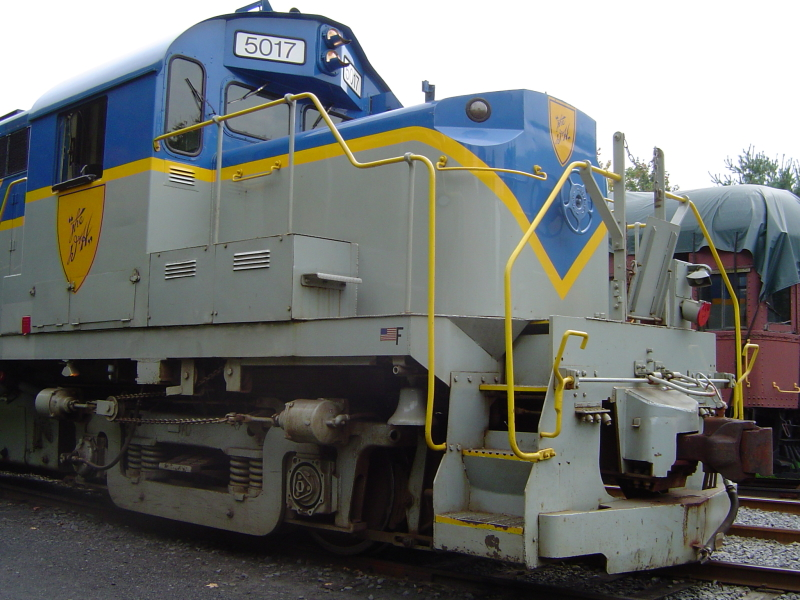
- Ex Delaware and Hudson Railway RS-36 #5017 at Arkville, NY
Type and origin
- Power type: Diesel-electric
- Builder: ALCO
- Model: RS-36
- Build date: February 1962 - August 1963
- Total produced: 40
Specifications
- Configuration
  - AAR: B-B
- Gauge: 4 ft 8 1/2 in (1,435 mm)
- Trucks: AAR type B
- Wheel diameter: 40 in (1,016 mm)
- Minimum curve: 390
- Wheelbase: 40 ft 4 in (12.29 m)
- Length: 57 ft 8 1/2 in (17.59 m)
- Width: 10 ft 1 5/8 in (3.09 m)
- Height: 15 ft 3 3/4 in (4.67 m)
- Loco weight: 247,200 lb (112,100 kg)
- Fuel capacity: 2,000 US gal (7,600 L)
- Prime mover: ALCO 12-251B
- RPM range: 1000 rpm max
- Engine type: Four-stroke diesel
- Aspiration: Turbocharger
- Generator: GE 5GT581A1
- Traction motors: (4) GE 752
- Cylinders: V-12
- Cylinder size: 9 in × 10 1/2 in (229 mm × 267 mm)
Performance figures
- Power output: 1,800 hp (1,300 kW)
- Tractive effort: 61,800 lb (28,000 kg)
Career
- Locale: U.S.A.

The ALCO RS-36 (DL 701) is a 1,800 horsepower (1,300 kW) diesel-electric locomotive of which 40 were produced by ALCO between February 1962 and August 1963 for seven railroads.

== Original owners ==
Image	Railroad	Quantity	Road numbers	Notes
	Atlantic and Danville Railway	2	1, 2	#2 now leased to Batten Kill Railroad and numbered SNEX #5012
	Apache Railway	3	700, 800, 900	800 to be displayed in Holbrook, AZ
	Chicago and North Western Railway	1	904	Renumbered 405, later 4259
	Delaware and Hudson	12	5012-5023	5015 preserved as Batten Kill #5015 -5017 preserved in original condition at Delaware and Ulster Railroad -5019 preserved in New Hampshire as Upper Hudson River Railroad #5019
	Nickel Plate Road	11	865-875	874-875 high short hood, equipped with steam generators, all to Norfolk & Western Railway 2865-2875
	Norfolk and Western Railway	6	407-412	
	Tennessee Central Railway	5	301-305	to Louisville and Nashville Railroad 910-914
	Total	40		

== Preservation ==
Several of RS-36s have been preserved in operating condition or put on display:

- Atlantic & Danville #2 has been fully restored and is owned by the Southern New England Railroad (now in D&H inspired paint and numbered 5012).
- Apache Railway #800 has been donated and will be put on display in front of the historic Navajo County Courthouse in Holbrook, AZ.
- Delaware & Hudson #5015 has been restored by the Southern New England Railroad.
- Delaware & Hudson #5017 is operational and owned by the Delaware & Ulster Railroad.
- Delaware & Hudson #5019 is stored at North Walpole, NH.

== Sources ==
- Dorin, Patrick C. (1972). Chicago and North Western Power. Burbank, California: Superior Publishing. p. 146. ISBN 0-87564-715-4.
- Pinkpank, Jerry A (1973). The Second Diesel Spotter's Guide. Kalmbach Books. pp. 208, 248. ISBN 0-89024-026-4.
