= ALCO Century 628 =

2800-hp 4-axle diesel-electric locomotive

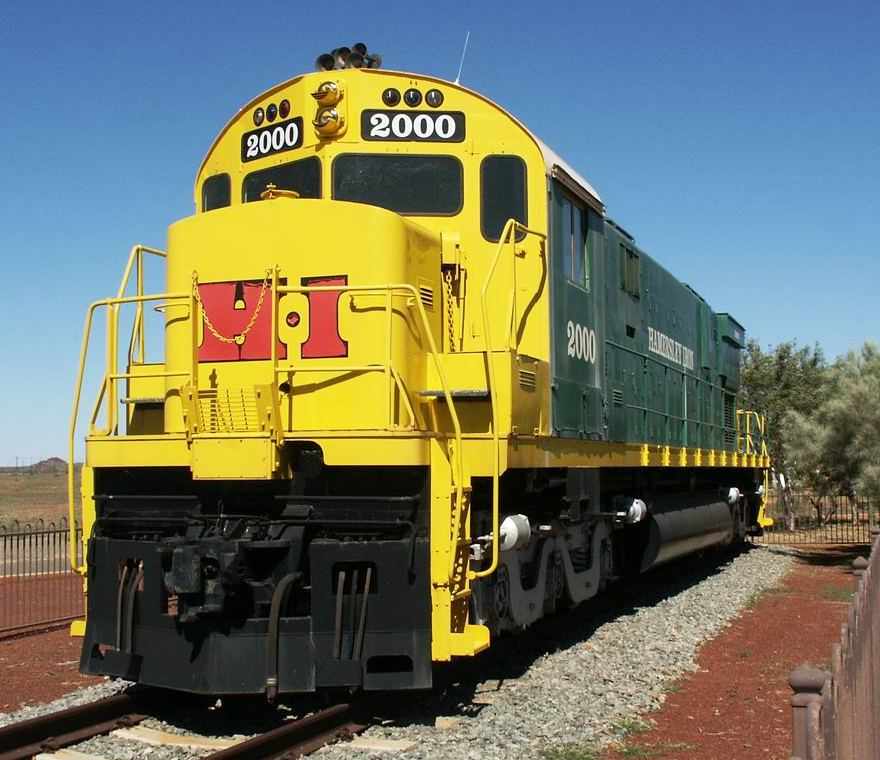
- Preserved Hamersley Iron 2000 at 7 Mile Yard, Dampier, Western Australia in July 2003
Type and origin
- Power type: Diesel-electric
- Builder: ALCO
- Model: DL628
- Build date: December 1963 - December 1968
- Total produced: 186
Specifications
- Configuration
  - AAR: C-C
- Gauge: 4 ft 8 1/2 in (1,435 mm)
- Prime mover: ALCO 16-251C
- Generator: 586A4 or 586C1R
- Traction motors: 752E6A
Performance figures
- Power output: 2,750 hp (2,051 kW)

The ALCO Century 628 is a six-axle, 2,750 hp (2,051 kW) diesel-electric locomotive. A total of 186 C628s were built between December 1963 and December 1968. Of these, 135 were for US railroads, 46 for Mexican railroads, and five for Australia.

The C628 replaced the C624 (DL600C/RSD-41) as a part of ALCO's 'Century' line of locomotives. The C624 was intended to replace the earlier RSD-15 model, but was never built. The C628 was offered instead in August 1963.

Hamersley Iron purchased five to haul iron ore services in the Pilbara region of Western Australia. They were built in Schenectady. All had been retired by 1982, with one preserved on a plinth in Dampier.

The Southern Pacific purchased the four demonstrators in 1964, and an additional 25 C628s were delivered in 1965.

== Original Owners ==
Image	Owner	Quantity	Road Numbers	Notes
	ALCO (Demonstrators)	4	628-1 - 628-4	
	Atlantic Coast Line	11	2000 - 2010	
	Chihuahua Pacifico (Mexico)	4	901 - 904	
	Delaware & Hudson	18	601 - 618	
	Ferrocaril del Pacifico (Mexico)	10	601 - 610	
	Hammersley Iron (Australia)	5	2000 - 2002, 2004, 2005	
	Lehigh Valley	8	625 - 632	
	Louisville & Nashville	15	1400 - 1414	
	Monon	9	400 - 408	
	Ferrocarriles Nacionales de México (Mexico)	32	8300 - 8331	
	Norfolk & Western	30	1100 - 1129	
	Pennsylvania Railroad	15	6300 - 6314	
	Southern Pacific	25	4845 - 4869	

== Preserved ==
=== Australia ===
- Hammersley Iron #2000 is preserved by the Pilbara Railways Historical Society in Dampier, Western Australia

=== North America ===
- Delaware & Hudson (D&H) #610 is preserved at the Museo de los Ferrocarriles de Yucatán in Mérida, Yucatán
- Ferrocarril de Pacifico (FCP) #606 is preserved as Ferrocarriles Nacionales de Mexico (FNM) #606 at the Museo de los Ferrocarriles de Yucatán in Mérida, Yucatán
