= Monongahela Connecting Railroad =

Overview
- Locale: Allegheny County, Pennsylvania, U.S.
- Dates of operation: 1885–2002

Technical
- Track gauge: 4 ft 8 1/2 in (1,435 mm) standard gauge

The Monongahela Connecting Railroad (reporting mark MCRR) or Mon Conn was a three-mile industrial railroad line in Pittsburgh, Pennsylvania. It was a subsidiary of the Jones & Laughlin Steel Company and a large portion of its work was for its parent company, though it also served other industries along the line.

== History ==
The railroad is possibly best known for its Hot Metal Bridge, which was used to carry molten iron across the Monongahela River from J&L's Eliza Furnaces to the Bessemer converters (later, open hearth furnaces) and rolling mills at J&L's South Side facility.

In 1966, the company was involved in construction of the Pittsburgh Tri-Port Terminal, which had been created "to offer prompt movement of products for rail, truck and river delivery," and was slated to be "used to load or unload river barges for transfer to trucks or railroad," and was "intended to reduce truck traffic over city streets."

The railroad was also a dieselization pioneer, buying many early diesel locomotives from Alco, General Electric and other manufacturers.

The Monongahela Connecting Railroad was acquired by real estate firm Almono in 2002, who ceased providing common carrier services the following year.

The Monongahela River bridge has been converted to a two-lane automobile bridge, with the adjacent hot metal bridge converted for bicycles. The bridges are collectively called the Hot Metal Bridge. The railroad served a few small industrial customers along the north/east (right downstream) bank of the river.

Joseph L. Sorensen was Vice President of the Monongahela Connecting Railroad from 1948 until 1952.

== See also ==
- Monongahela Railway, not to be confused with the Monongahela Connecting Railroad.
