= ALCO HH series =

American locomotive series (1931–1940)

- Alco ad for their HH600 diesel switchers from Railway Age. The New Haven Railroad had just bought 10 of them. This is the photo of one of the switchers from the ad-New Haven 913.
Type and origin
- Power type: Diesel-electric
- Builder: ALCO
- Build date: 1931–1940
- Total produced: HH600: 79; HH660: 43; HH900: 21; HH1000: 34
Specifications
- Configuration
  - AAR: B-B
- Gauge: 4 ft 8 1/2 in (1,435 mm) standard gauge
- Wheel diameter: 40 in (1,016 mm)
- Length: 45 ft 2 3/4 in (13.79 m)
- Prime mover: ALCO HH600/900: McIntosh & Seymour 531; HH660/1000: McIntosh & Seymour 538
- Engine type: Inline-6 Four stroke diesel
- Aspiration: HH600/660: Naturally aspirated HH900/1000: Turbocharged
- Displacement: 9,572 cu in (156.86 L)
- Cylinders: 6
- Cylinder size: 12.5 in × 13 in (318 mm × 330 mm)
Performance figures
- Power output: 600 hp (447 kW), 660 hp (492 kW), 900 hp (671 kW), or 1,000 hp (746 kW)
Career
- Disposition: 8 preserved, 1 abandoned, 1 unknown, remainder scrapped

The ALCO HH series was an early set of diesel switcher locomotives built by the American Locomotive Company (ALCO) of Schenectady, New York between 1931 and 1940, when they were replaced by the S series: the 660 hp (490 kW) S-1 and 1,000 hp (750 kW) S-2. They were ALCO's first diesel switchers to enter true series production, and among the first land vehicles anywhere to use the revolutionary diesel-electric power transmission.

The "HH" name stood for "High Hood", a name ALCO came eventually to use in an official context, but originally an unofficial name. Model designations such as HH600 are only semi-official. Original ALCO designations were either descriptive or based on the internal order/design number.

A total of 177 of the HH series was produced; comprising one prototype and four production models of varying power outputs.

== ALCO 600 (New Haven #0900) ==
The first HH series locomotive, ALCO demonstrator #600, was mechanically almost identical to later designs, but the appearance differed. The sides of the locomotive's hood sloped outward from top to bottom, and brake equipment was exposed beneath the cab. It rode on a unique pattern of trucks. After a period of demonstration on a number of railroads, the unit was sold to the New York, New Haven and Hartford Railroad as #0900. This number often was used to describe the locomotive, although the classification on the builder's data card was "404-OE-200". This first unit was built in July 1931.

=== Diesel-electric power transmission ===
The locomotive was equipped with a four-stroke McIntosh & Seymour 531 straight-6 diesel engine, powering a General Electric GT551A1 main generator. Four nose-suspended GE-287-D traction motors in the trucks were geared at a ratio of 4.25:1 to the wheels; the motors were cooled by electrically driven traction motor blowers.

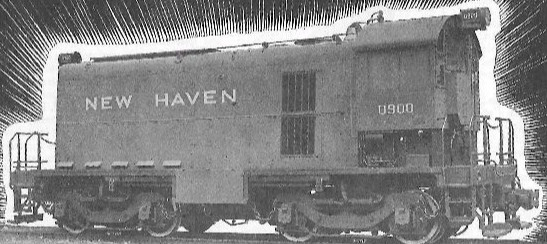
The New Haven's Alco 600 in 1933.

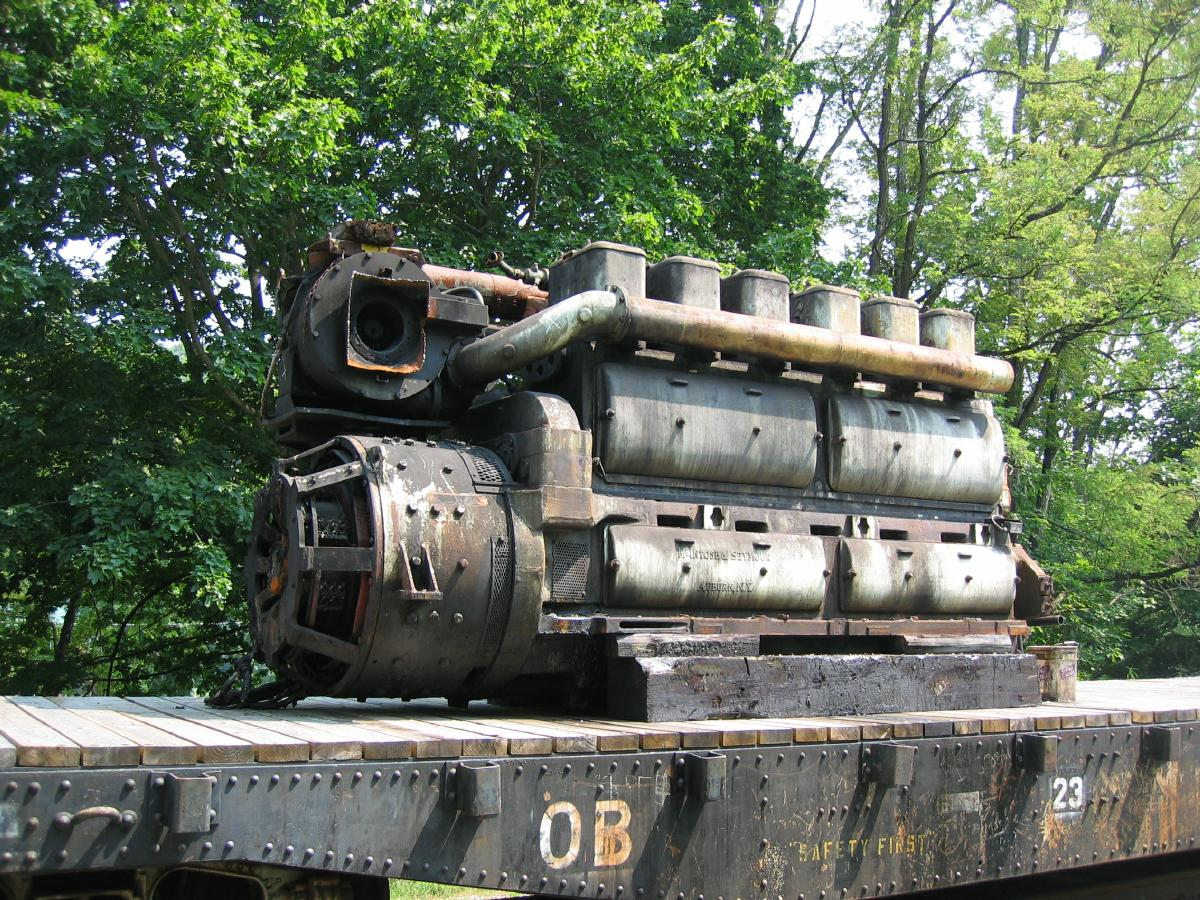
6-cylinder McIntosh & Seymour engine on a flat car

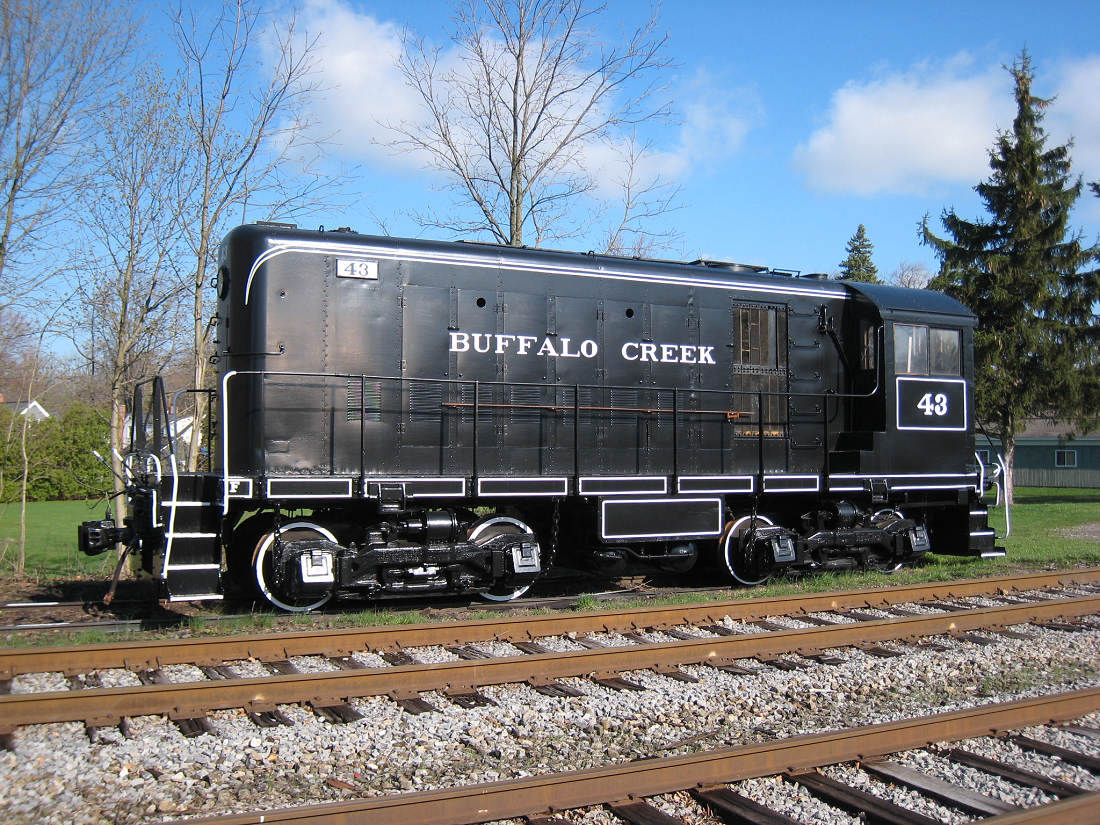
Buffalo Creek #43 HH660 owned and operated by the WNYRHS. 2018 photo.

== HH600 ==
The HH600 was nearly identical to the previous #0900 of the New Haven internally and mechanically, but it was clad in new bodywork, with a straight-sided hood and cab sides that came all the way to the frame. The HH600's were powered by 6-cylinder McIntosh & Seymour 531 engines of 600 hp (450 kW). They were built from July 1932 through May 1939; in all, 78 HH600s were constructed. The first-built units had sharp-edged front hood corners, but in 1934 ALCO employed industrial designer Otto Kuhler to clean up the appearance; he curved the corners and recessed the headlight, and all subsequent HH series units were of this style until another restyling in 1938 where the nose was further rounded. Late versions of this locomotive used the 6-cylinder 538 engine.

=== Original buyers ===
Image	Railroad	Quantity	Road numbers	Notes
	American Locomotive Company (prototype)	1	600 (1st)	to New Haven 0900
	American Locomotive Company (demonstrators)	5	1, 600 (2nd)	1 to ATSF 2300
	American Locomotive Company (demonstrators)	5	601	to Lehigh Valley Railroad 105
	American Locomotive Company (demonstrators)	5	602	to Boston and Maine 1102
	American Locomotive Company (demonstrators)	5	603	to Delaware, Lackawanna and Western 401
	Atchison, Topeka and Santa Fe Railway	2	2301–2302	2301 retired Feb 1, 1971 Relocated to Temple, TX; 2302 to American Grain & Cattle
	Belt Railway of Chicago	2	302–303	
	Boston and Maine Railroad	1	1101	
	Central Railroad of New Jersey	4	1020–1023	1021 to Houdaille Construction Materials Co.
	Chicago and Eastern Illinois Railroad	1	102	
	Chicago and Illinois Western Railroad	1	1	
	Chicago and Western Indiana Railroad	1	1	
	Delaware, Lackawanna and Western Railroad	7	402–408	405–406 to Erie Lackawanna as 322-323
	Elgin, Joliet and Eastern Railway	1	209	
	Hoboken Manufacturers Railroad	1	601	
	Illinois Central Railroad	8	9006–9013	Scrapped 1951
	Massena Terminal Railroad	1	7	
	Michigan Limestone and Chemical Company	2	101–102	
	New York Central Railroad	6	614–619	
	New York Central (Boston and Albany Railroad)	5	680–684	Renumbered 806–810
	New York, New Haven and Hartford Railroad	10	0911–0920	
	Patapsco and Back Rivers Railroad	7	54–60	
	Peoria and Pekin Union Railway	1	100	
	Portland Terminal Company [Maine]	4	1001–1004	
	South Buffalo Railway	6	54–59	
	Steelton and Highspire Railroad	1	31	
	Universal Atlas Cement	1	4	
	Total	79		

== HH900 ==
The HH900 was a 900 hp (670 kW) version of the HH series using a turbocharged version of the McIntosh & Seymour 531 engine. Both turbocharged models (HH900 and HH1000) needed a greater cooling capacity, and this was reflected in the larger bodyside radiator space of both models, which distinguishes them from the lower-powered HH600 and HH660. The 21 HH900 units were produced between March 1937 and January 1939, after which they were supplanted by the McIntosh & Seymour 538T-engined HH1000. Several HH900s were built with the 538T engine.

=== Original buyers ===
Image	Railroad	Quantity	Road numbers	Notes
	American Locomotive Company (demonstrator unit)	1	101	to CRI&P 730
	Birmingham Southern Railroad	8	81–88	
	Elgin, Joliet and Eastern Railway	1	402	
	Kansas City Terminal Railway	1	50	
	Minnesota Transfer Railway	3	90–92	
	Philadelphia, Bethlehem and New England Railroad	1	207	to South Buffalo Railway 70
	Reading Company	2	40–41	
	Warrior River Terminal Company	2	50–51	
	Youngstown and Northern Railroad	2	211–212	
	Total	21		

== HH660 ==
The HH660 started production in ALCO's lineup in October 1938; 43 examples were built until April 1940. It used a naturally aspirated version of the 6-cylinder McIntosh and Seymour 538 engine, producing 660 hp (490 kW). Externally, HH660s were indistinguishable from late HH600s.

=== Original buyers ===
Image	Railroad	Quantity	Road numbers	Notes
	American Locomotive Company (plant switcher)	1	4	
	Atlantic Coast Line Railroad	1	1900	
	Boston and Maine Railroad	1	1162	
	Buffalo Creek Railroad	1	43	To Relco - 1966, to WNYRHS - 2000
	Chicago, Milwaukee, St. Paul and Pacific Railroad (“Milwaukee Road”)	4	1600–1603	Renumbered 980–983: 980-981 to Relco; 982 in Scottsdale, AZ; 983 to III Transportation then Illinois Railway Museum
	Delaware, Lackawanna and Western Railroad	3	409–411	409–410 to Erie-Lackawanna Railway 324–325
	Elgin, Joliet and Eastern Railway	3	210–212	211 to Gopher State Scrap and Metal
	Erie Railroad	4	302–305	305 to Erie-Lackawanna Railway, same number
	Green Bay and Western Railroad	1	101	
	Inland Steel	1	50	
	Louisville and Nashville Railroad	1	10	
	Maine Central Railroad	2	951–952	
	Minneapolis and St. Louis Railway	1	D939	To Glacier Sand & Gravel
	New York, New Haven and Hartford Railroad	10	0921–0930	0924 to Penn Central 9411 in 1969
	Northern Pacific Railway	3	125–127	Renumbered NP 600-602: NP 600 sold WWV 770; WWV 770 to RELCo. 770; RELCo. 770 to Port of Longview 770; Port of Longview #770 to Northwest Railway Museum, under restoration to NP 125.; NP 601 to WWV 775; WWV 775 scrapped; NP 602 to RELCo. 602, on display in CB&Q paint, Albia, Iowa
	Southern Pacific Company	3	1001–1003	
	Tennessee Central Railway	1	50	
	Wabash Railroad	2	100, 150	
	Total	43		

== HH1000 ==
The HH1000 replaced the HH900, with the new McIntosh and Seymour 538T engine, turbocharged to produce 1000 hp (750 kW), a 100 hp (75 kW) increase from the previous model. They were produced between May 1939 and December 1940; 34 were built. M&STL D539 was the only HH1000 built with the 531T engine.

=== Original buyers ===
Image	Railroad	Quantity	Road numbers	Notes
	American Locomotive Company (demonstrator unit)	1	1000	
	Atchison, Topeka and Santa Fe Railway	12	2310–2321	
	Atlantic Coast Line Railroad	1	600	
	Birmingham Southern Railroad	1	89	
	Chicago, Milwaukee, St. Paul and Pacific Railroad (“Milwaukee Road”)	1	1671	
	Manufacturers Railway	3	202–203	
	Michigan Limestone and Chemical Company	4	103–106	
	Minneapolis and St. Louis Railway	1	D-539	Renumbered 92; to Chicago and North Western Railway
	Missouri Pacific Railroad	1	9102	
	Newburgh and South Shore Railway	2	1–2	
	Oliver Iron Mining Company	7	900–906	
	Total	34		

== Specifications ==
Overall length	45 ft 2.75 in	13.79 m
Between bolster centers:	21 ft 3 in	6.48 m
Truck wheelbase:	8 ft 0 in	2.44 m
Width over grabirons:	9 ft 10 in	3.00 m
Height above rails:	14 ft 3 in	4.34 m
Wheel diameter:	40 in	1.02 m
Fuel capacity:	625 gal	2365.88 L
Engine (HH600):	McIntosh & Seymour 531	
Power (HH600):	600 hp	450 kW
Engine (HH900):	McIntosh & Seymour 531T (turbocharged)	
Power (HH900):	900 hp	670 kW
Engine (HH660):	McIntosh & Seymour 538	
Power (HH660):	660 hp	500 kW
Engine (HH1000):	McIntosh & Seymour 538T (turbocharged)	
Power (HH1000):	1000 hp	750 kW
Main generator:	GT-551	
Traction motors:	GE 287 (x4)	
Standard gearing:	68 to 16	
Weight:	197500 lbs	89.58 t

== Surviving units ==
Locomotive	Type	Built	Owner	Image
Atchison, Topeka & Santa Fe #2301	HH600	1937	Temple Railroad & Heritage Museum	
Buffalo Creek #43	HH660	1940	Western New York Railway Historical Society	
Delaware, Lackawanna & Western #409	HH660	1940	Delaware-Lackawanna	
Elgin, Joliet & Eastern #210 or Northern Pacific #127	HH660	1940	Monroe County Historical Society	
Elgin, Joliet & Eastern #211	HH660	1940	Gopher Scrap, Mankato MN	
Milwaukee Road #1601	HH660	1940	unknown	
Milwaukee Road #1603	HH660	1939	Illinois Railway Museum	
Northern Pacific #125	HH660	1940	Northwest Railway Museum	
Birmingham Southern #82	HH900	1937	Heart of Dixie Railroad Museum	
Oliver Iron Mining #900	HH1000	1940	Lake Superior Railroad Museum	

A few HH-series switchers still survive in revenue service, and more are in museums. Working HH locomotives include an HH660 at Gopher Scrap in Mankato, Minnesota, one owned by the Western New York Railway Historical Society, and one from the Delaware-Lackawanna Railroad owned by Genesee Valley Transportation Company at Scranton, Pennsylvania. Another HH660, Northern Pacific Railway #125, is presently under restoration to her as-delivered appearance at the Northwest Railway Museum.

Among the preserved locomotives are an HH600, four HH660s and an HH1000. Birmingham Southern #82, the sole surviving HH900, is on static display at the Heart of Dixie Railroad Museum in Calera, Alabama.

== See also ==
- List of ALCO diesel locomotives

== Additional information ==
- Data sheets: HH-600, HH-660
- Komaneski, John. ALCO HH600 Roster. Retrieved March 27, 2005. States information originally from Extra 2200 South.
- Komaneski, John. ALCO HH660 Roster. Retrieved March 27, 2005. States information originally from Extra 2200 South.
- Komaneski, John. ALCO HH900 and HH1000 Roster. Retrieved March 27, 2005. States information originally from Extra 2200 South.
- Laundry, Mark. Alco High Hood Models. Retrieved March 29, 2005.
- Pinkepank, Jerry A. (1973). The Second Diesel Spotter's Guide. Kalmbach Publishing Co., Milwaukee, WI. ISBN 0-89024-026-4.
- Steinbrenner, Richard (2003) The American Locomotive Company A Centennial Remembrance. Chapter VI subchapter "ALCO's First Production Diesels".
- Sweetland, David. (2004) Santa Fe's Alco Switcher Fleet. Diesel Era Vol. 15 No. 6, November/December 2004, pp. 10–31. Withers Publishing, Halifax, Pennsylvania.
