= Rebel (train) =

Passenger train

Rebel Power cars
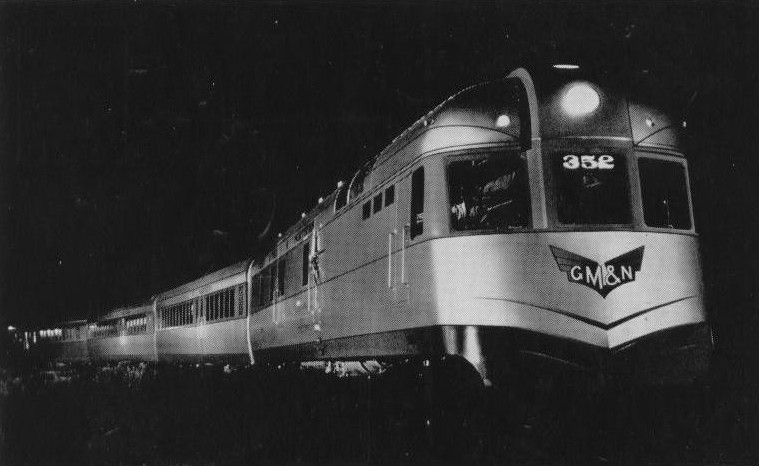
- The Rebel.
Type and origin
- Power type: Diesel-electric
- Builder: American Car and Foundry
- Build date: 1935 (2) and 1937 (1)
- Total produced: 3
Specifications
- Configuration
  - AAR: 2-B
- Gauge: 1,435 mm (4 ft 8 1/2 in)
- Loco weight: 175,800 pounds (79,700 kg)
- Prime mover: McIntosh & Seymour 531
- Engine type: Four-stroke diesel
- Generator: DC generator
- Traction motors: DC traction motors
- Cylinders: 6
- Cylinder size: 12.50 in × 13.00 in (318 mm × 330 mm)
- Transmission: Electric
- Loco brake: Straight air
- Train brakes: Air
Performance figures
- Power output: 600 hp (450 kW)
Career
- Operators: Gulf, Mobile and Northern Railroad; Gulf, Mobile and Ohio Railroad
- Locale: North America
- Disposition: All scrapped

The Gulf, Mobile and Northern Railroad Rebels were lightweight, streamlined diesel-electric trainsets built by American Car and Foundry. The first two trains, purchased in 1935, provided service over the roughly 450 miles (720 km) between New Orleans, Louisiana, and Jackson, Tennessee. The third train, purchased in 1937, allowed service to be added between Jackson and Mobile, Alabama. Unlike other earlier diesel streamliners, these trains were not articulated, as their normal operation required adding and removing cars from the consist.

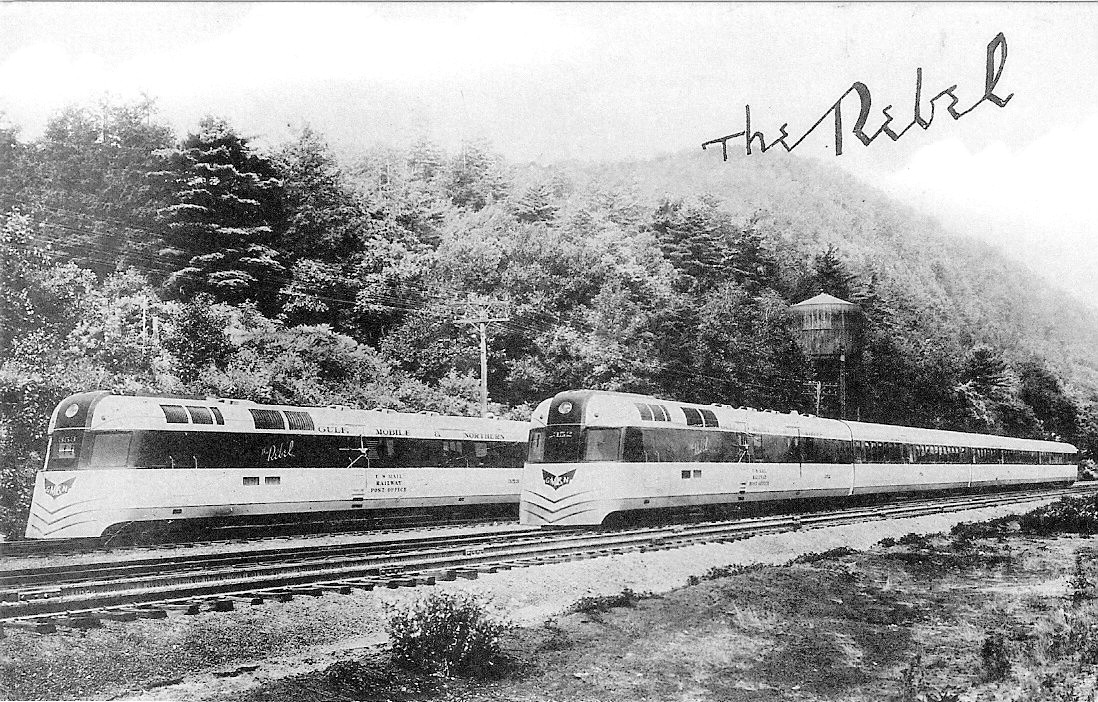
Gulf Mobile and Northern Rebels

The trains were powered by lightweight, shovel-nosed power cars, styled by Otto Kuhler, and equipped with 600 hp (450 kW), six-cylinder McIntosh & Seymour 531 prime movers and Westinghouse electric transmission components. The units had an uncommon 2-B wheel arrangement, mounted atop a pair of road trucks. The aft section was divided into two separate compartments: one was used to transport baggage and the other served as a small railway post office, or RPO (the forward door, located just behind the radiator louvers, was equipped with a mail hook).

Two of these power cars, numbered 352 and 353, were purchased as part of the 1935 order, along with three buffet-coach cars, and two sleeper-observation cars. Normal operating procedure was for a northbound train to leave New Orleans with two coaches and an observation car. Due to lower ridership on the northern portion of the route, one of the 2 coaches would be removed from the northbound train at Jackson, Mississippi, and the train would continue on to Jackson, Tennessee as a 3 car consist. The southbound train would add the extra coach during its own stop at Jackson, Mississippi.

The 1937 order included a third power car, and 2 coach-sleepers. This third power car was numbered 354, and though it had additional air intakes in the carbody, mechanically it was identical to the other two. It ran from Mobile, to Union, Mississippi with a single coach-sleeper, which was added to the northbound mainline train from New Orleans. It then returned to Mobile with the coach-sleeper from the southbound train. Due to low ridership and wartime exigencies, this run was cut off on April 28, 1942.

While the original Rebel served New Orleans and Jackson, after the merger of the GM&N and Mobile and Ohio to create the Gulf, Mobile and Ohio Railroad in 1942, the trains route was extended to St. Louis. At this time, it was converted to full-sized equipment hauled by DL-105 locomotives (see ALCO DL-109) which were also styled by Otto Kuhler.

The powercars were scrapped in 1962.

== See also ==
- List of ALCO diesel locomotives
- FM OP800, similar St. Louis Car Company built railcars, powered by Fairbanks-Morse
- Seaboard Air Line 2027 & 2028, similar St. Louis Car Company built railcars, powered by EMD
