= SNCF Class BB 71000 =

Class of French diesel locomotives

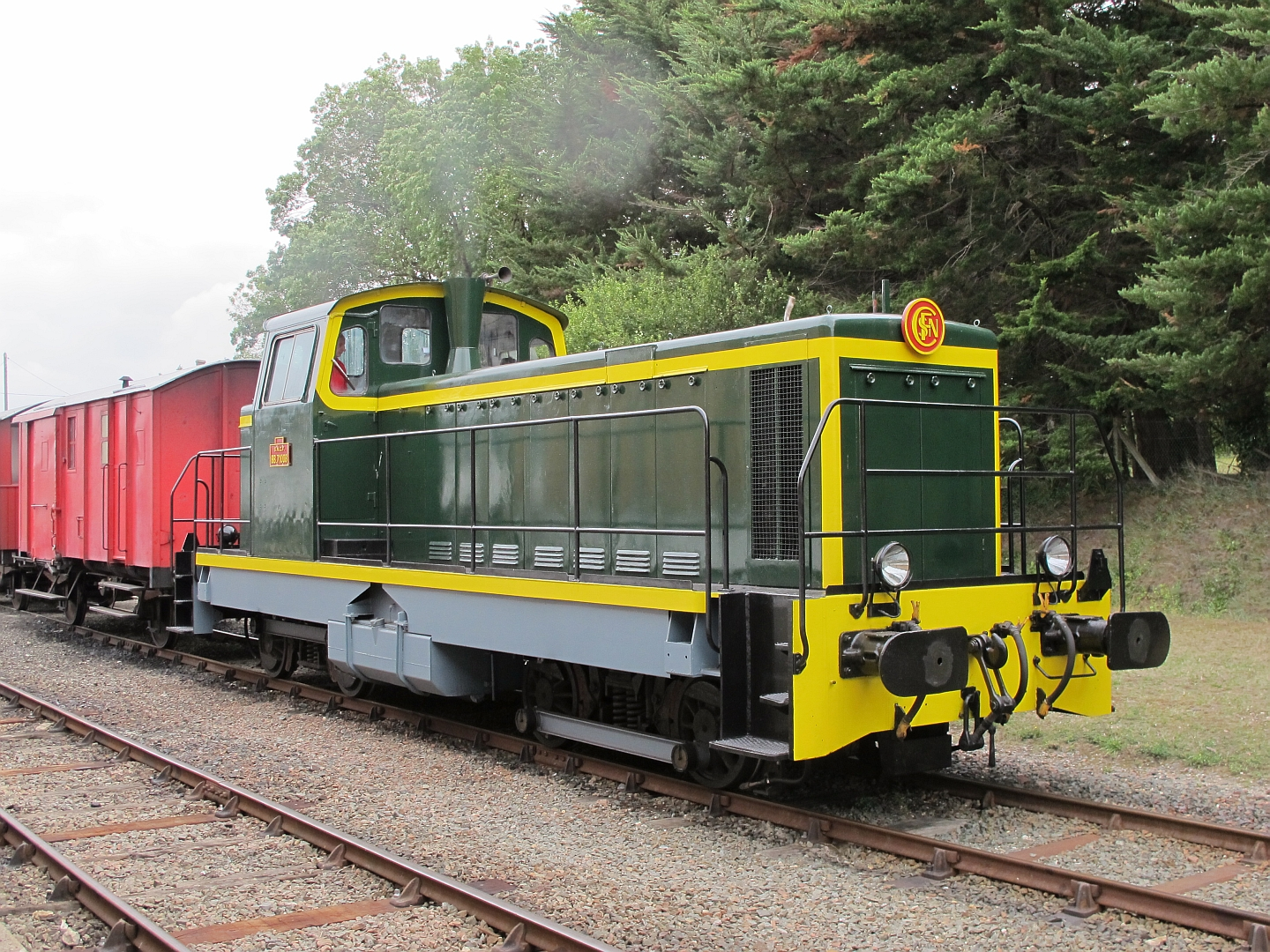
- BB 71008 at Chaillevette in 2016
Type and origin
- Power type: Diesel
- Builder: Fives-Lille/CFD
- Build date: 1965–1966
- Total produced: 30
Specifications
- Configuration
  - UIC: B′B′
  - Commonwealth: B-B
- Gauge: 1,435 mm (4 ft 8 1/2 in)
- Wheel diameter: 860 mm (34 in)
- Length: 20.190 m (66 ft 2.9 in)
- Loco weight: 55 t (54 long tons; 61 short tons)
- Fuel type: Diesel
- Prime mover: Poyaud V12
- Transmission: Mechanical
Performance figures
- Maximum speed: 80 km/h (50 mph)
- Power output: 615 kW (825 hp)
- Tractive effort: 164 kN (37,000 lb_{f})
Career
- Operators: SNCF
- Class: BB 71000
- Number in class: 30
- Numbers: BB 71001–BB 71030

The SNCF Class BB 71000 is a class of 30 centre-cab B′B′ diesel shunting locomotives. Introduced in 1965, they were the last locomotives in service with SNCF to feature side rods. The class was withdrawn from traffic between 1998 and 1999. A number were sold on for industrial use.

== Description ==
This small series of 30 locomotives was built by the Departmental Railway Company (CFD), following the BB 60001 which served as their prototype. They were delivered from March 1965 to February 1966. These locomotives, with mechanical transmission and driving rods, were mainly used on freight services. Despite the better efficiency of the mechanical transmission, per gross ton towed and per kilometer, than that of a locomotive with electric transmission, their lack of reliability led to 21 of them being resold to various companies. Certain V12 engines were coupled to a Leroy-Somer alternator, producing 660 volts in three phases (star coupling), as a high power generator (580 kVA), installed in a generator van, for TEE trains (car air-conditioned stainless steel PBA, Mistral 1969, and Grand Confort).

== Preservation ==
- BB 71001, formerly owned by the Pyrénées-Orientales Departmental Council and based in Boulou, used by the local rail operator (OFP) at Languedoc-Roussillon for shunting and acquired by the latter.
- BB 71008, Re-engineered with a Cummins prime mover and preserved by Trains and Traction.
- BB 71010, ex-Rive Bleue Express, acquired in 2022, by the Fédération des amis des chemins de fer secondaires (FACS).
- La BB 71015 acquired by le chemin de fer de la Vendée in 2022.
- BB 71018 acquired by le chemin de fer de la Vendée in 2022.
- BB 71027 acquired by le chemin de fer de la Vendée in 2023.
- BB 71030 by Patry.
