= McIntosh & Seymour 531 =

The McIntosh & Seymour 531 was a diesel prime mover built by McIntosh & Seymour for use in railroad locomotives built by its parent company, the American Locomotive Company (Alco).

The 531 engine was designed and introduced in 1931. It was an inline six-cylinder engine, with a bore of 12.5 inches (32 cm) and a stroke of 13 inches (33 cm). It was produced in naturally aspirated and turbocharged variants, making 600 and 900 horsepower, respectively. It was primarily used in Alco's line of HH series switcher locomotives, as well as the Rebel passenger trains. It was replaced by the 538 engine, which had a similar output as the 531 but with upgraded components.
