= JNR Class ED76 =

Japanese electric locomotive class

Class ED76
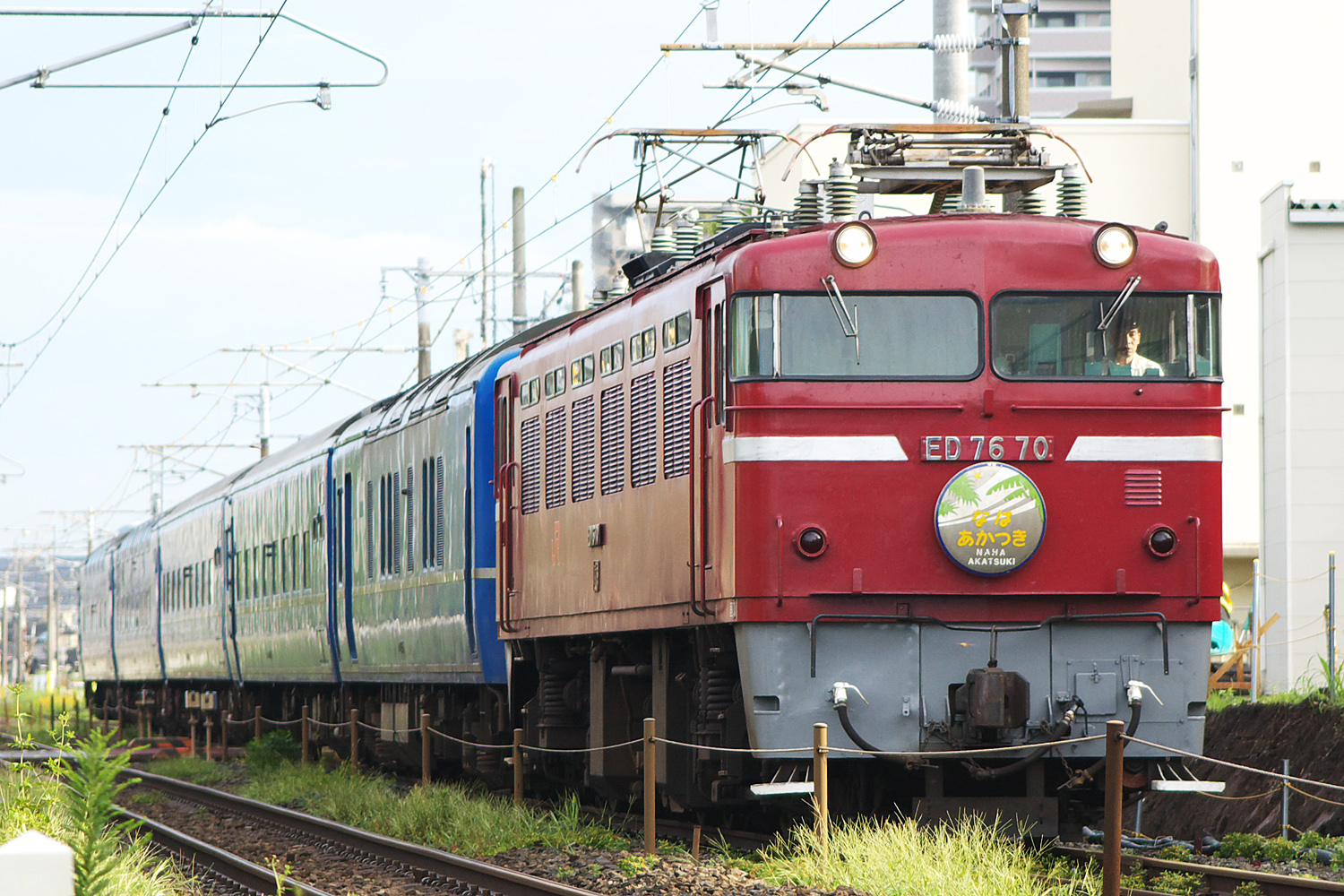
- JR Kyushu ED76 70 on Naha sleeping car service in September 2006
Type and origin
- Power type: Electric
- Builder: Hitachi, Mitsubishi, Toshiba
- Build date: 1965–1979
- Total produced: 139
Specifications
- Configuration
  - UIC: Bo'2Bo'
  - Commonwealth: Bo-2-Bo
- Gauge: 1,067 mm (3 ft 6 in)
- Bogies: DT129, TR103D
- Wheel diameter: 1,120 mm (44.09 in)
- Length: 17,400 mm (57 ft 1 in)
- Width: 2,805 mm (9 ft 2 3/8 in)
- Loco weight: 87.0 t (85.6 long tons; 95.9 short tons)
- Electric system/s: 20 kV AC at 50/60 Hz overhead wire
- Current pickup: Pantograph
- Traction motors: MT52 x 4
Performance figures
- Maximum speed: 100 km/h (60 mph)
- Power output: 1,900 kW (2,500 hp)
Career
- Operators: JNR (1965–1987); JR Hokkaido (1987–2001); JR Kyushu (1987–2012); JR Freight (1987–)
- Number in class: 10 (as of 1 April 2016)
- Delivered: 1965
- Preserved: 5
- Disposition: Operational

The Class ED76 (ED76形) is a Bo-2-Bo wheel arrangement AC electric locomotive type operated on passenger and freight services in Japan since 1965, originally by Japanese National Railways (JNR), and later by Hokkaido Railway Company (JR Hokkaido), Kyushu Railway Company (JR Kyushu) and Japan Freight Railway Company (JR Freight). As of 1 April 2016, just 10 locomotives remained in service, all operated by JR Freight.

== Variants ==
- ED76-0
- ED76-500
- ED76-1000

== ED76-0 ==
94 class ED76-0 locomotives were built from 1965 to 1976 and numbered ED76 1 to ED76 94.

As of 1 April 2016, the remaining fleet consists of two locomotives, ED76 81 and ED76 83, operated by JR Freight.

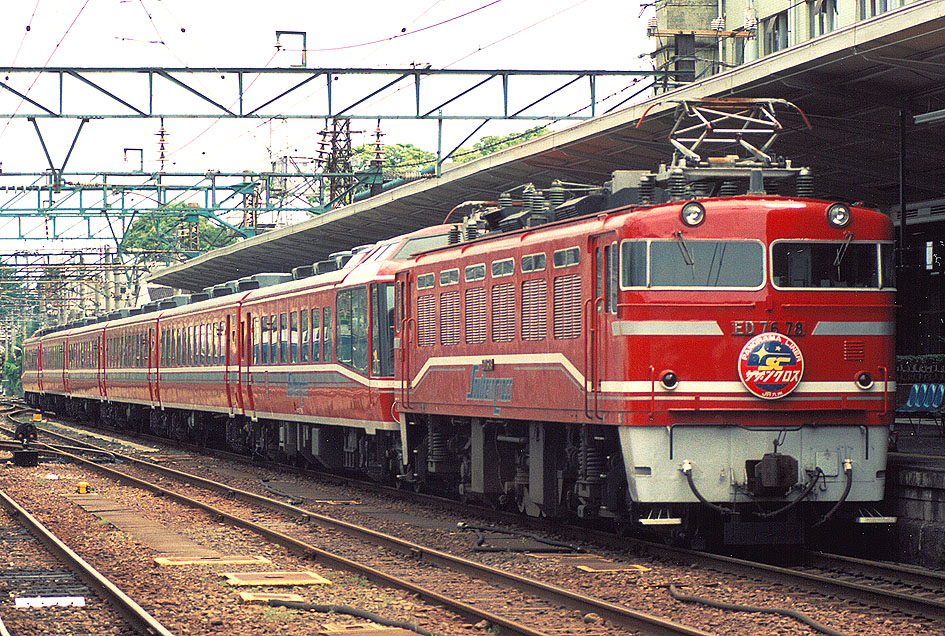
Specially repainted ED76 78 for use with the Southern Cross Joyful Train set in 1987

== ED76-500 ==
22 class ED76-500 locomotives were built from 1968 for use in Hokkaido, numbered ED76 501 to ED76 522. These locomotives included larger water and fuel tanks for the train heating steam generator and had accordingly longer bodies. They were intended to be used in pairs, and featured cab gangway doors.

ED76 514 was modified for used in the Seikan Tunnel and renumbered ED76 551.

All ED76-500s except for the unique ED76 551 were withdrawn by 1994. ED76 551 was withdrawn in 2001.

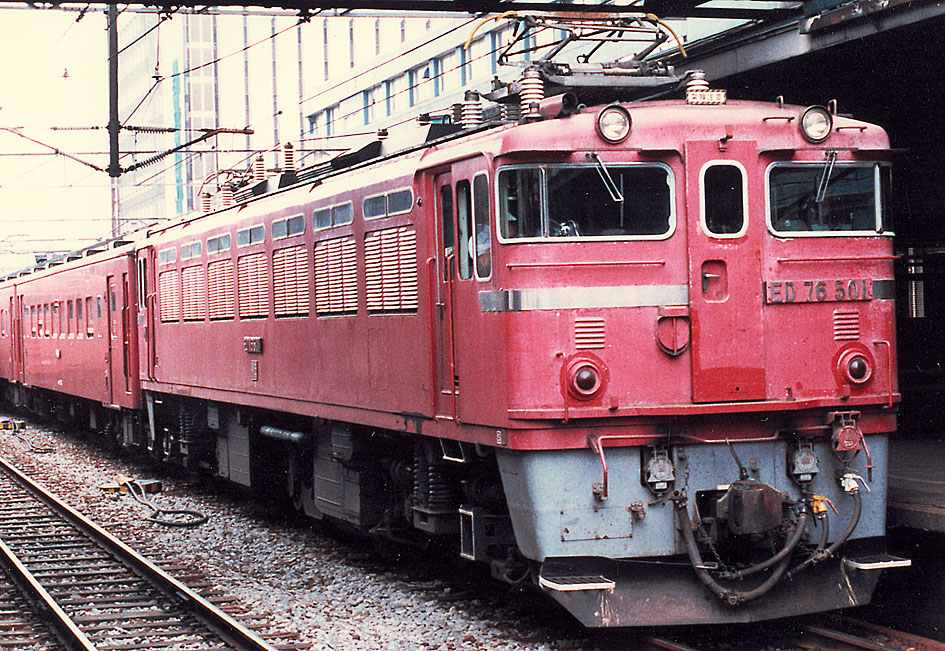
ED76 501 on a local passenger service in Hokkaido in 1986

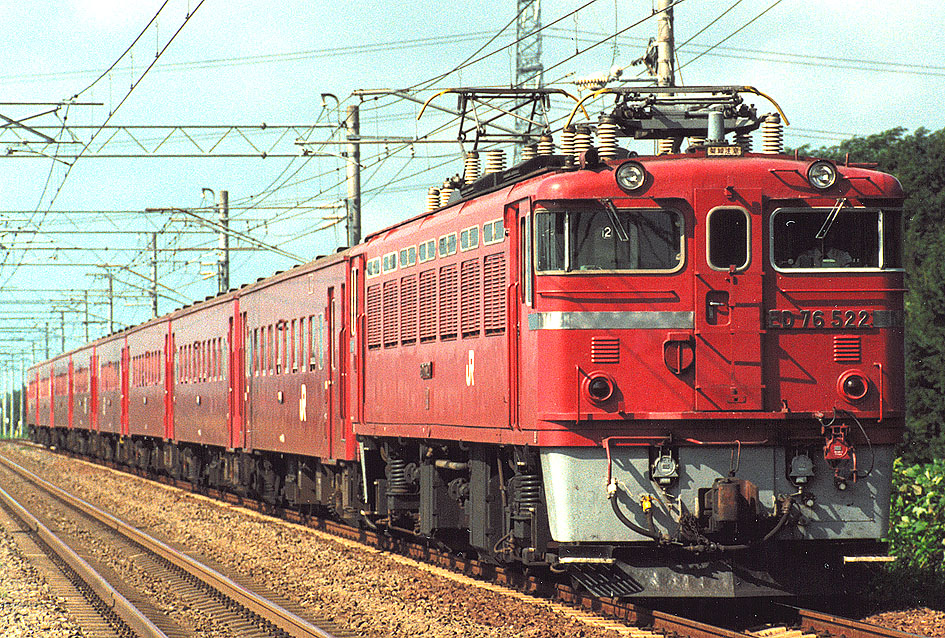
ED76 522 on a local passenger service (date unknown)

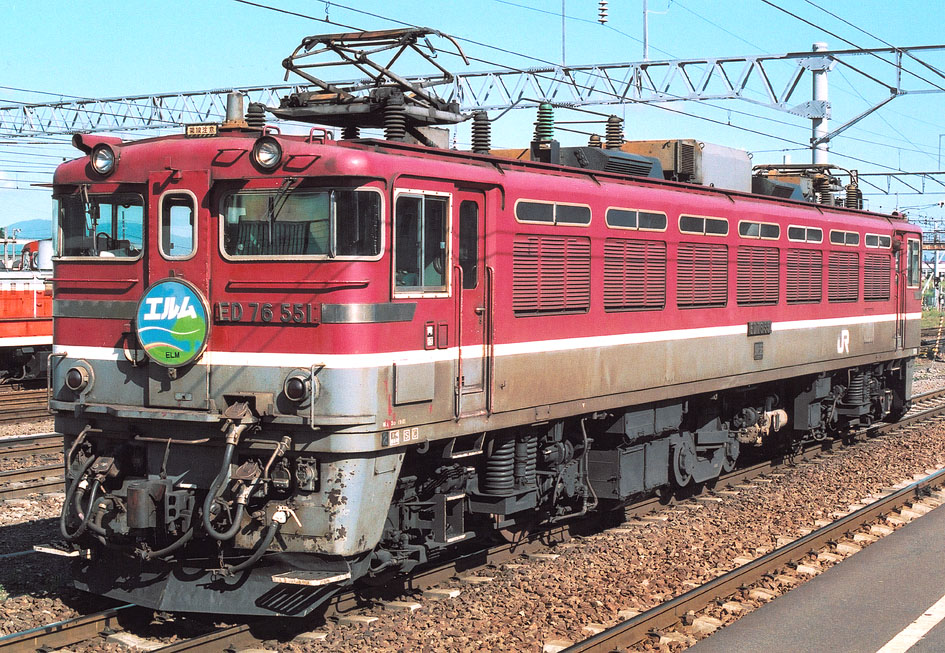
ED76 551 carrying the Elm sleeper service headboard (date unknown)

== ED76-1000 ==
23 class ED76-1000 locomotives were built from 1970 to 1979 for express freight use and numbered ED76 1001 to ED76 1023.

As of 1 April 2016, the remaining fleet consists of eight locomotives, operated by JR Freight.

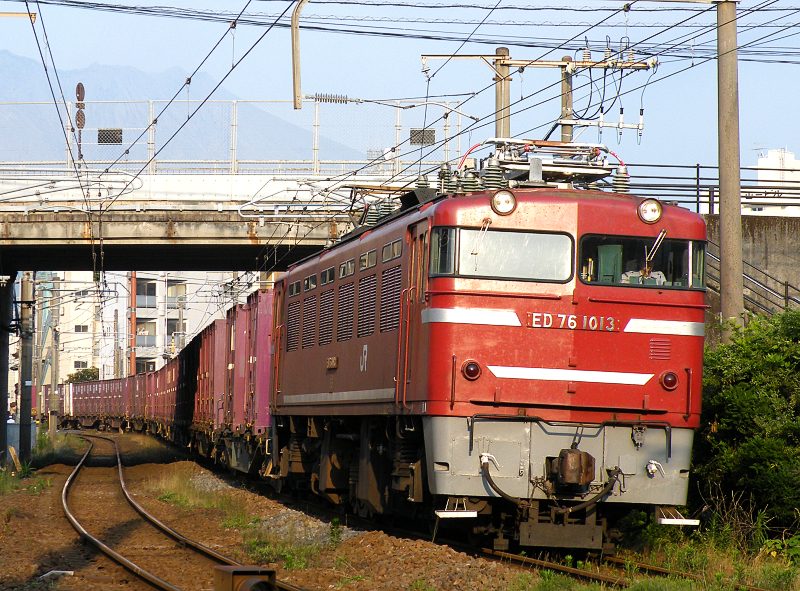
JR Freight refurbished locomotive ED76 1013 in June 2009

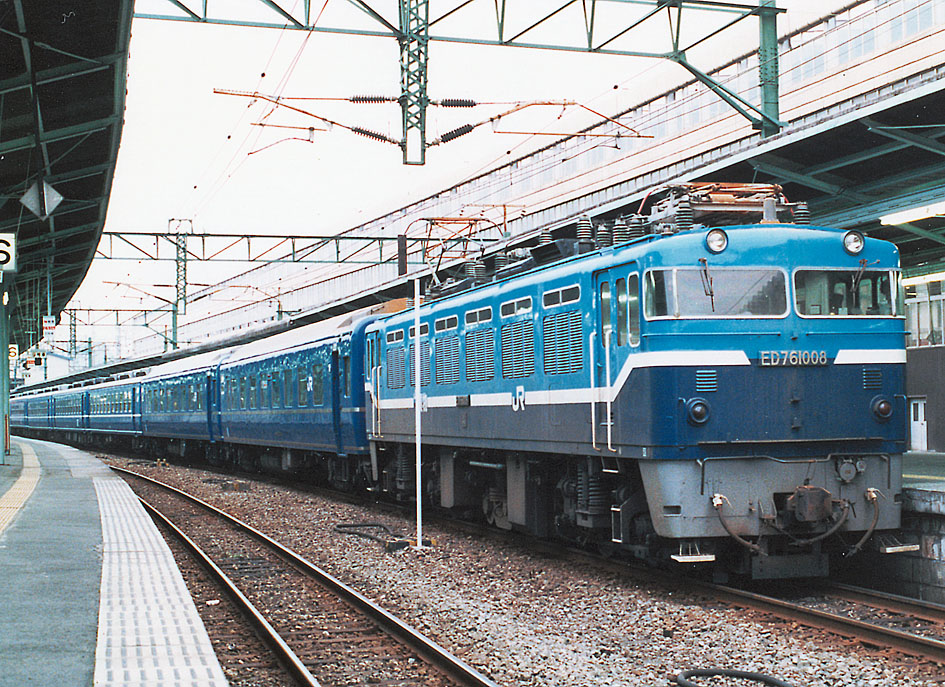
Experimentally painted JR Freight ED76 1008 on Nichinan express at Kokura Station (date unknown)

== Preserved examples ==
The following examples have been preserved.

- ED76 1: Kyushu Railway Heritage Museum, (cab end only, previously stored inside JR Kyushu Kokura Works, Kitakyushu)
- ED76 91: Hita Tenryosui no Sato, Hita, Oita
- ED76 505: Mikasa Railway Village, Mikasa, Hokkaido
- ED76 509: Otaru Transport Museum, Otaru, Hokkaido
- ED76 1006: JR Freight Moji Depot (stored for training purposes)
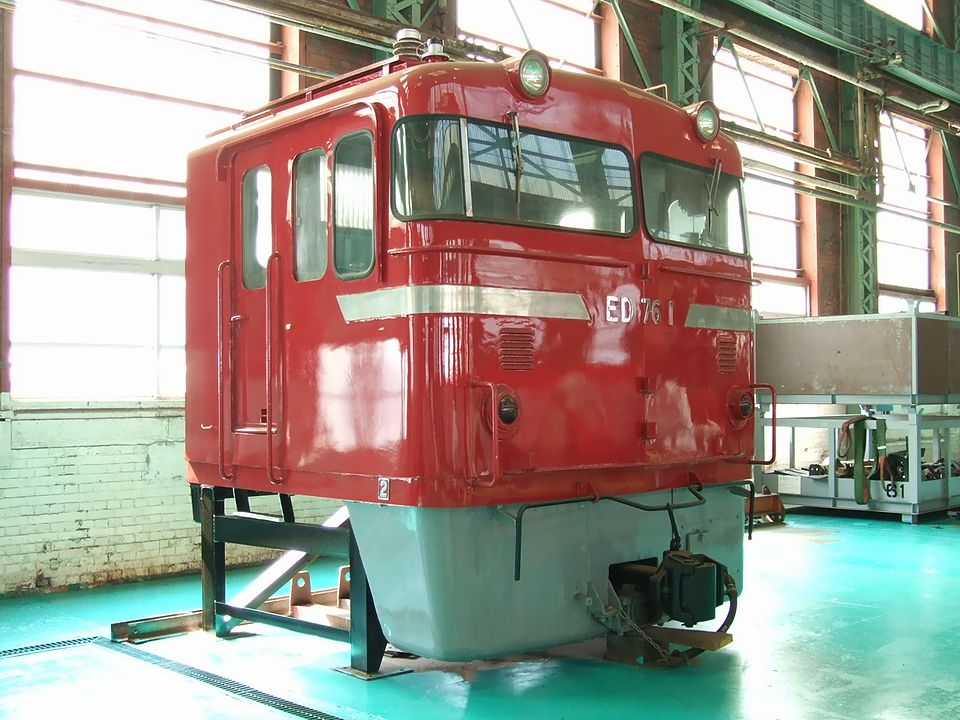
The cab end of ED76 1 at Kokura Works, October 2008

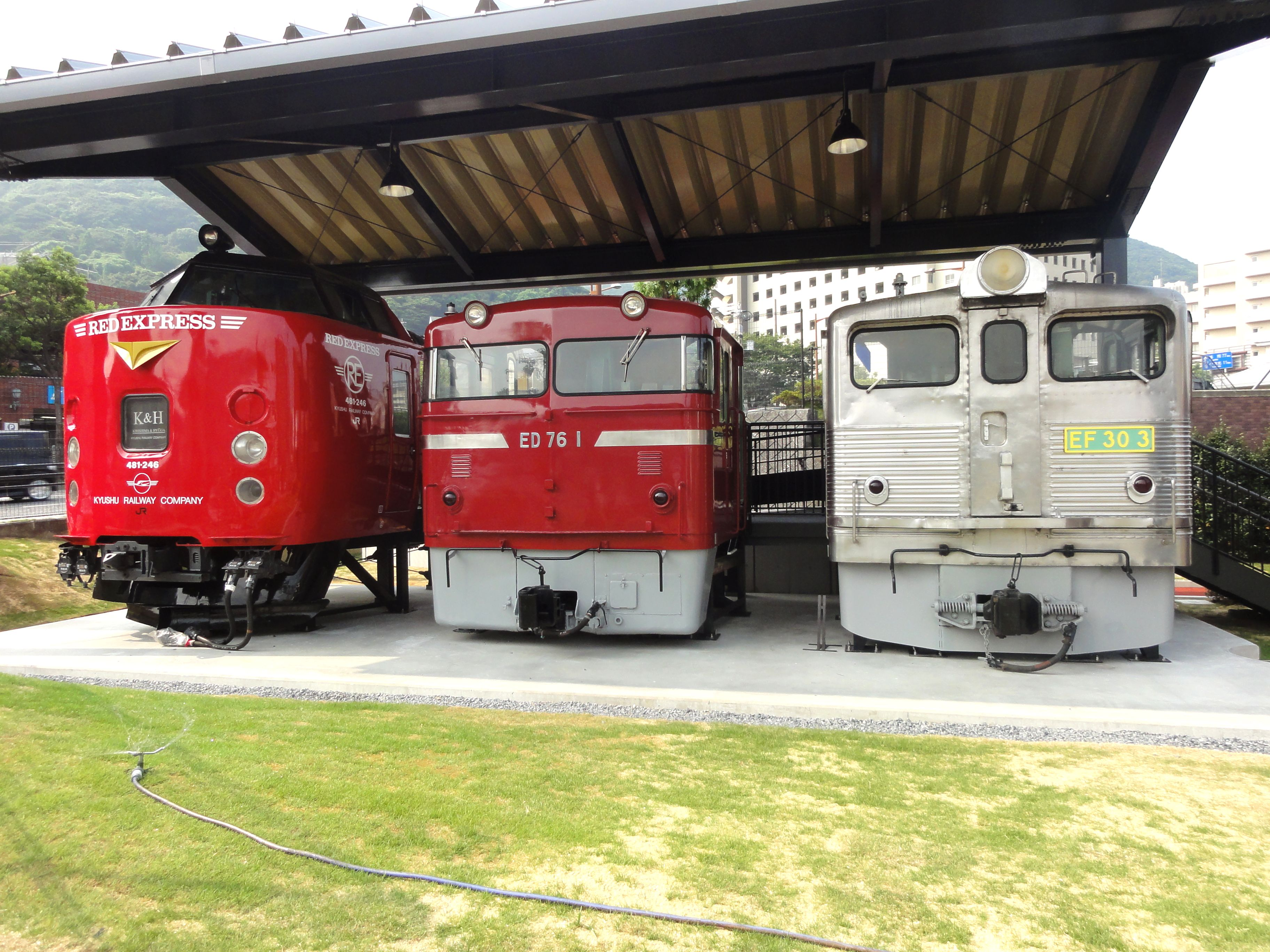
The cab end of ED76 1 at Kyushu Railway Heritage Museum, August 2013

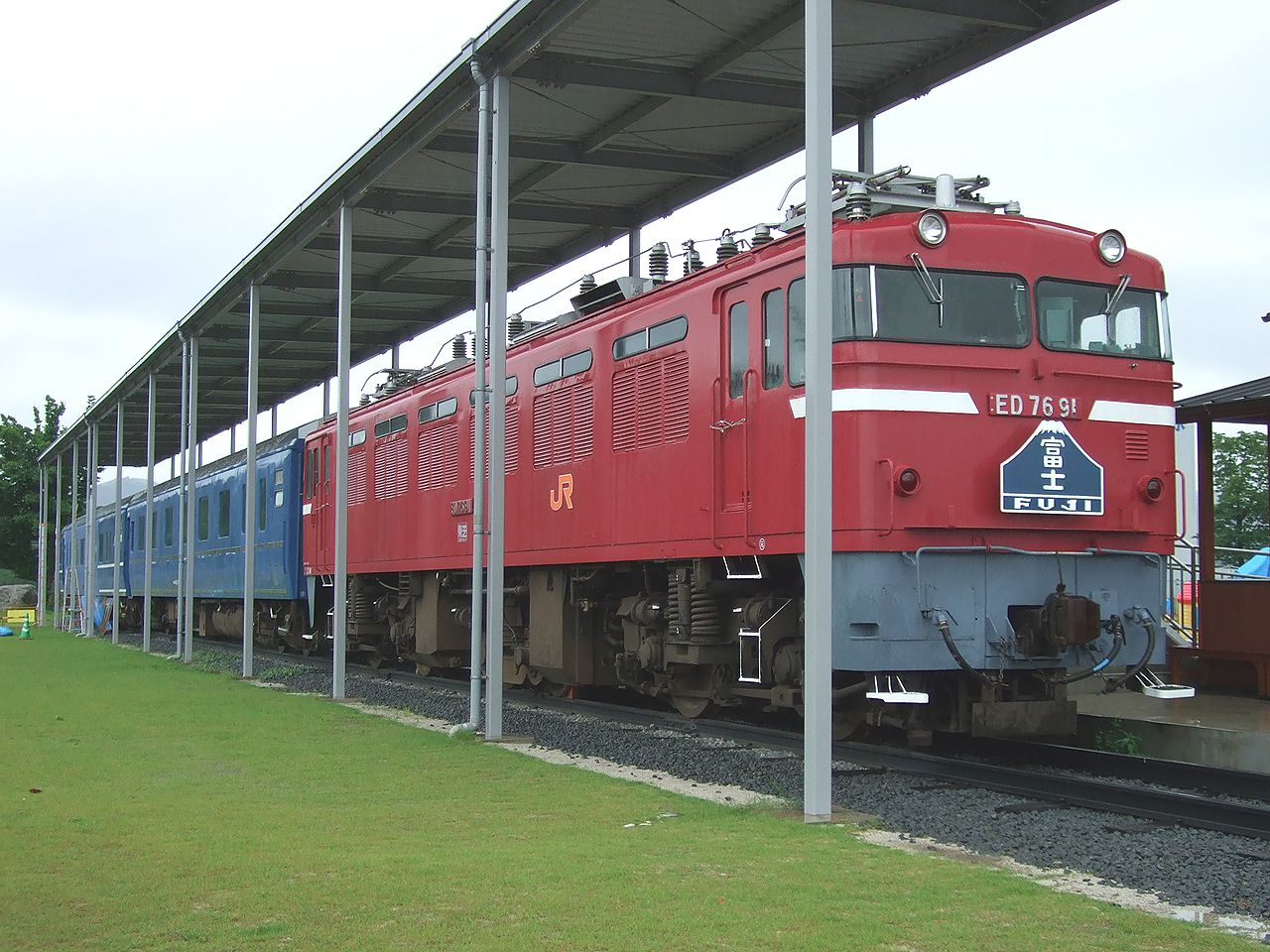
ED76 91 preserved at Hita Tenryosui no Sato, June 2012

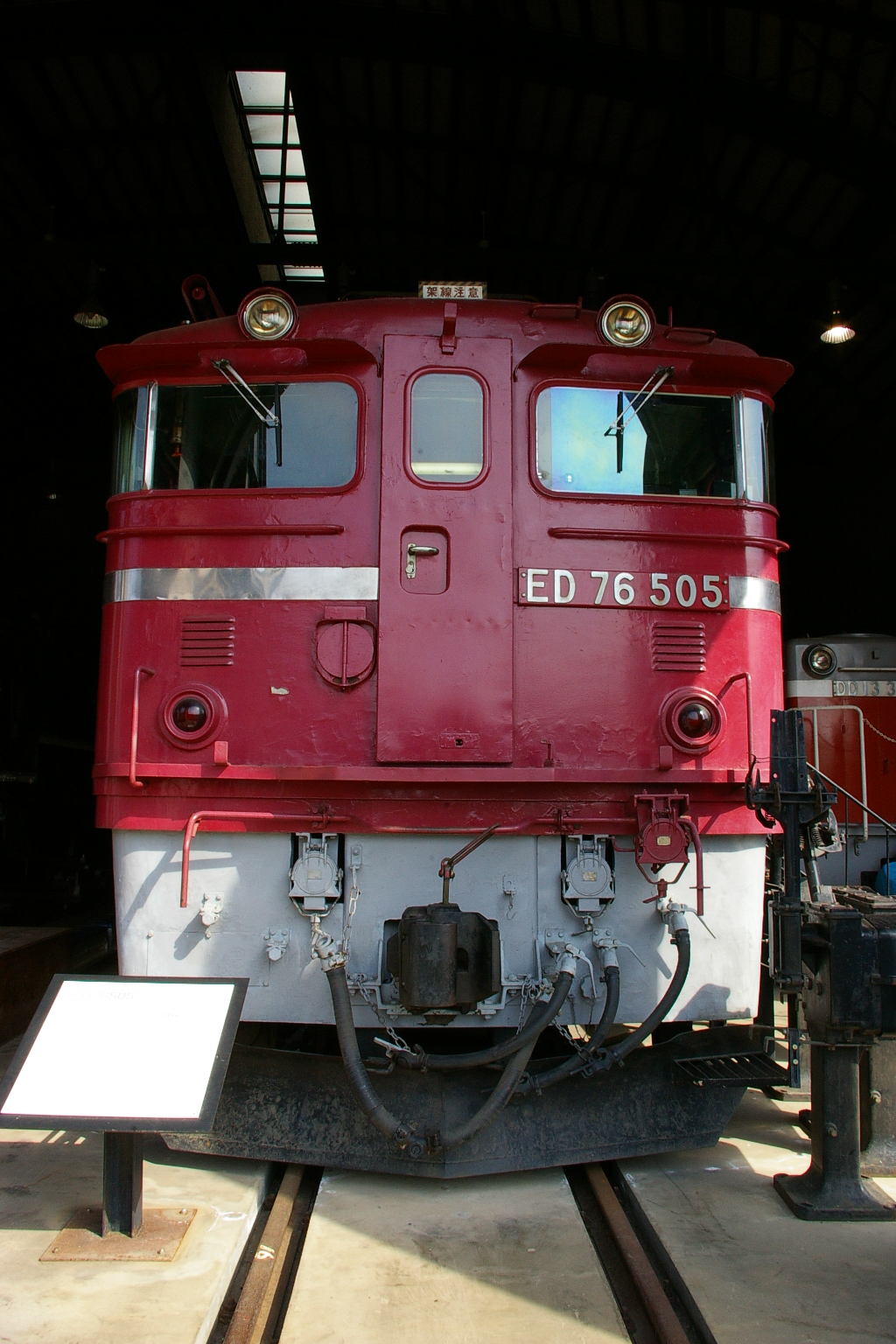
ED76 505 preserved at Mikasa Railway Village, May 2007

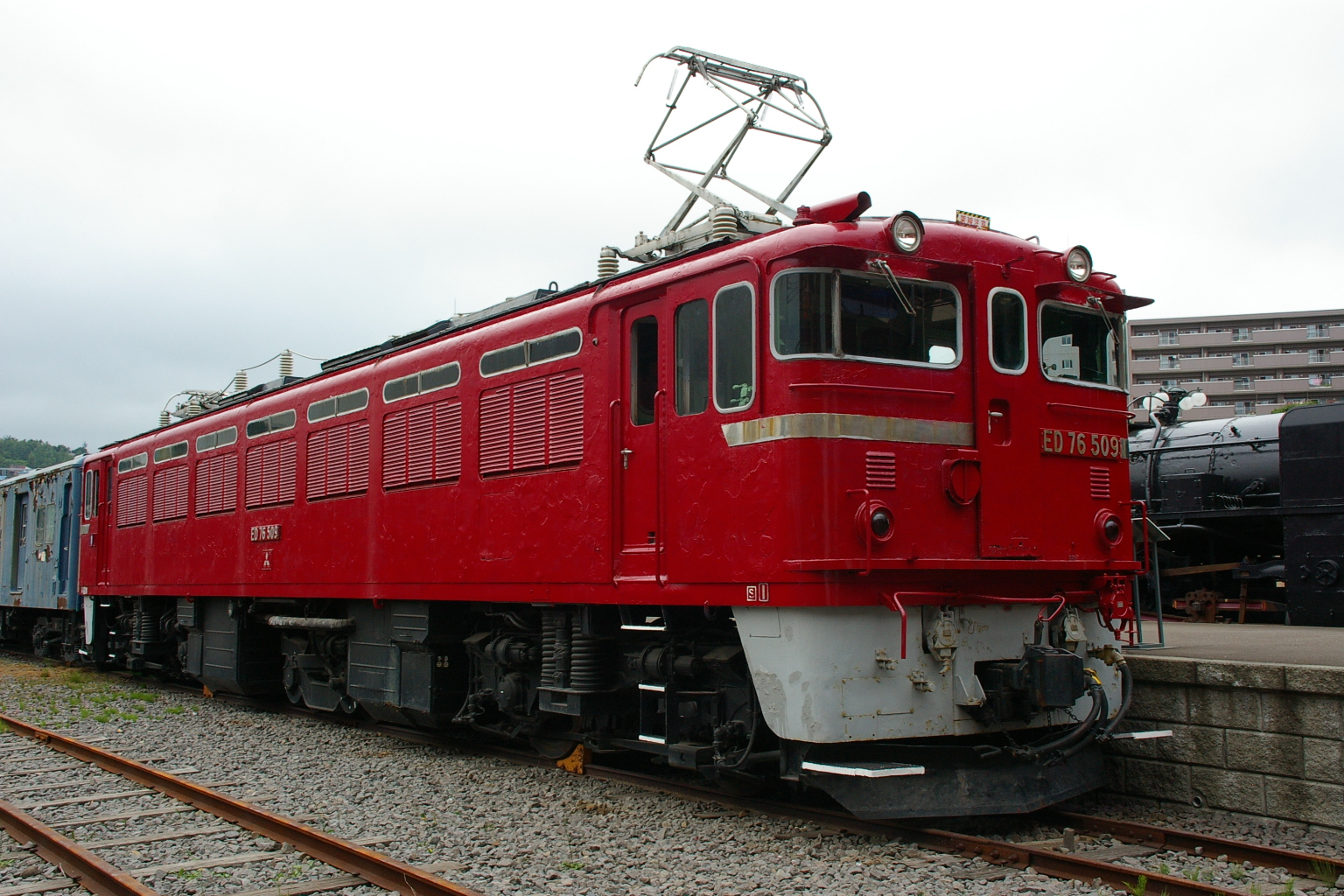
ED76 509 preserved at Otaru Transport Museum, July 2007

== Classification ==
The ED76 classification for this locomotive type is explained below.

- E: Electric locomotive
- D: Four driving axles
- 7x: AC locomotive with maximum speed exceeding 85 km/h (55 mph)
