= JNR Class ED62 =

Japanese locomotive class

Class ED62
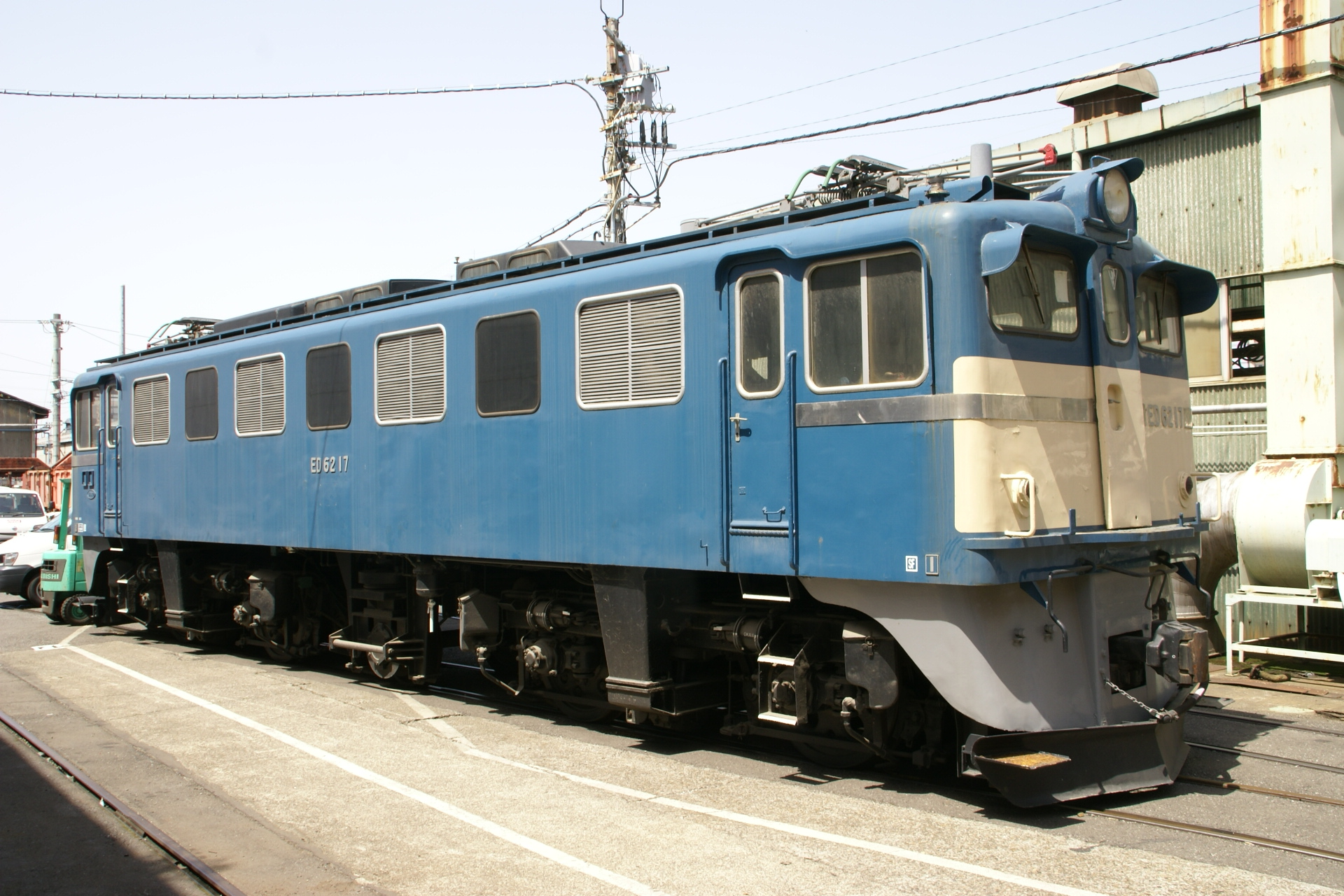
- Preserved ED62 17 at Omiya Works Open Day in May 2007
Type and origin
- Power type: Electric
- Rebuilder: JNR Nagano Works
- Rebuild date: 1974–1979
- Number rebuilt: 18
Specifications
- Configuration
  - Commonwealth: Bo-1-Bo
- Gauge: 1,067 mm (3 ft 6 in)
- Driver dia.: 1,120 mm (44.09 in)
- Length: 14,300 mm (46 ft 11 in)
- Width: 2,800 mm (9 ft 2 1/4 in)
- Height: 3,969 mm (13 ft 1/4 in)
- Loco weight: 62 t (61 long tons; 68 short tons)
- Electric system/s: 1,500 V DC overhead line
- Current pickup: Pantograph
- Traction motors: DC
Performance figures
- Maximum speed: 90 km/h (56 mph)
- Power output: 1.56 MW (2,090 hp)
Career
- Operators: JNR, JR Freight
- Number in class: 18
- Withdrawn: 1984–2002
- Disposition: Three preserved but then scrapped. None ultimately survived.

The Class ED62 (ED62形) was a Bo-1-Bo wheel arrangement DC electric locomotive type formerly operated in Japan from 1974 until 2002 by Japanese National Railways (JNR) and later by JR Freight.

== History ==
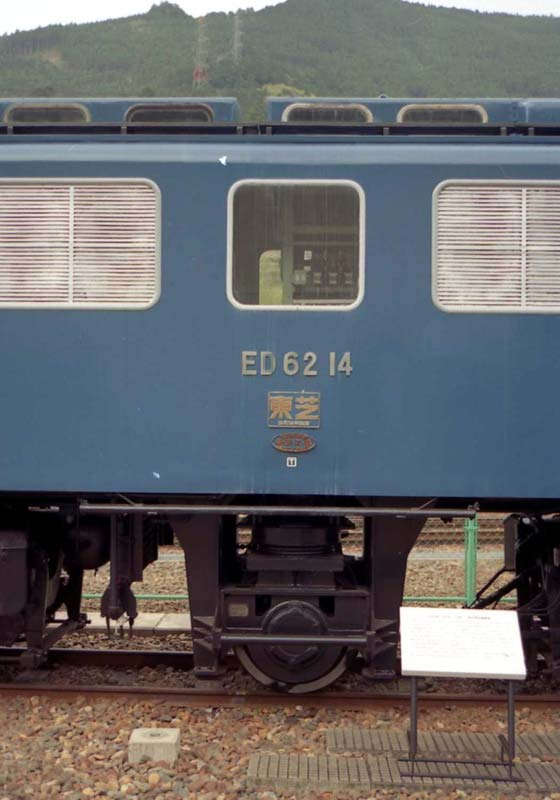
The added carrying axle

The Class ED62 locomotives were created between 1974 and 1979 by modifying the 18 earlier JNR Class ED61 Bo-Bo electric locomotives with the addition of a center non-driven axle. Rebuilding was carried out at JNR's Nagano Works. The primary aim of rebuilding was to reduce the axle load (from 15 t to 13 t) for use on the Iida Line, where the class displaced vintage JNR Class ED18 (English Electric) and JNR Class ED19 (Westinghouse) locomotives, and later JNR Class EF10 locomotives.

One highlight of the class's career was when ED62 15 hauled the Imperial Train on the Iida Line in May 1979 for the 30th National Tree Planting Festival. It was also not uncommon to see ED62s close to Tokyo when they worked to Shin-Tsurumi Depot for examinations.

Eight members of the class were still in service in 1987 when JNR was split into separate JR Group companies, and ED62 17 was repainted into the new JR Freight livery shortly after. Regular ED62-hauled petroleum traffic on the Iida Line ended in September 1996. Freight operations on the line formally ceased in March 1997, after which the surviving locomotives were placed in storage ED62 16 and ED62 17 remained registered until March 2002.

== Build details ==
Number	Former number	Converted	Withdrawn
ED62 1	ED61 3	June 1974	February 1987
ED62 2	ED61 2	August 1975	December 1985
ED62 3	ED61 9	August 1975	October 1998
ED62 4	ED61 8	August 1975	October 1998
ED62 5	ED61 6	August 1975	October 1998
ED62 6	ED61 14	August 1976	October 1998
ED62 7	ED61 4	August 1976	October 1998
ED62 8	ED61 11	October 1976	February 1987
ED62 9	ED61 1	November 1976	May 1985
ED62 10	ED61 13	July 1977	February 1987
ED62 11	ED61 10	September 1977	May 1985
ED62 12	ED61 5	October 1977	June 1985
ED62 13	ED61 12	November 1977	June 1985
ED62 14	ED61 16	February 1978	November 1984
ED62 15	ED61 7	March 1978	February 1996
ED62 16	ED61 17	August 1978	March 2002
ED62 17	ED61 18	October 1978	March 2002
ED62 18	ED61 15	January 1979	July 1985

== Preserved examples ==
Three Class ED62 locomotives were retained after withdrawal; however, all three were subsequently scrapped.

- ED62 1 - JR East Nagano depot; scrapped in February 2016
- ED62 14 - Sakuma Rail Park; scrapped in July 2010 after closure of the museum
- ED62 17 - Stored at JR Freight's Omiya Rolling Stock Depot in standard blue livery; removed from its long term storage position by March 2021
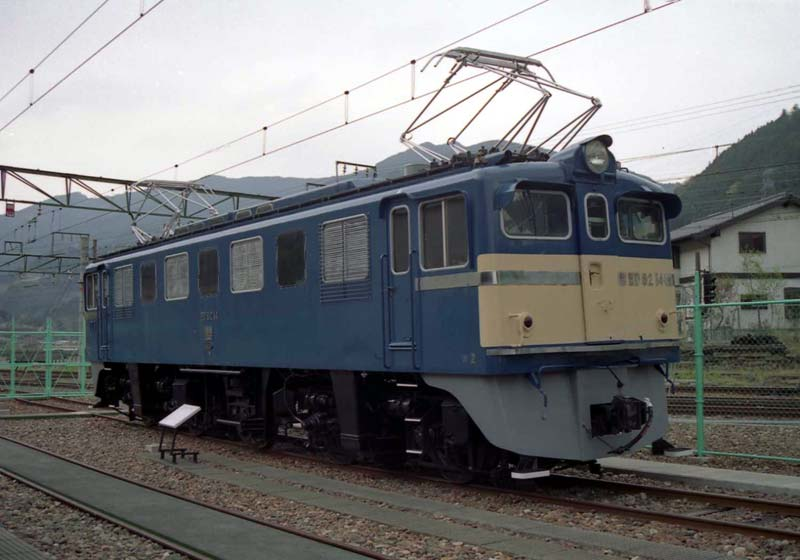
Preserved ED62 14 at Sakuma Rail Park

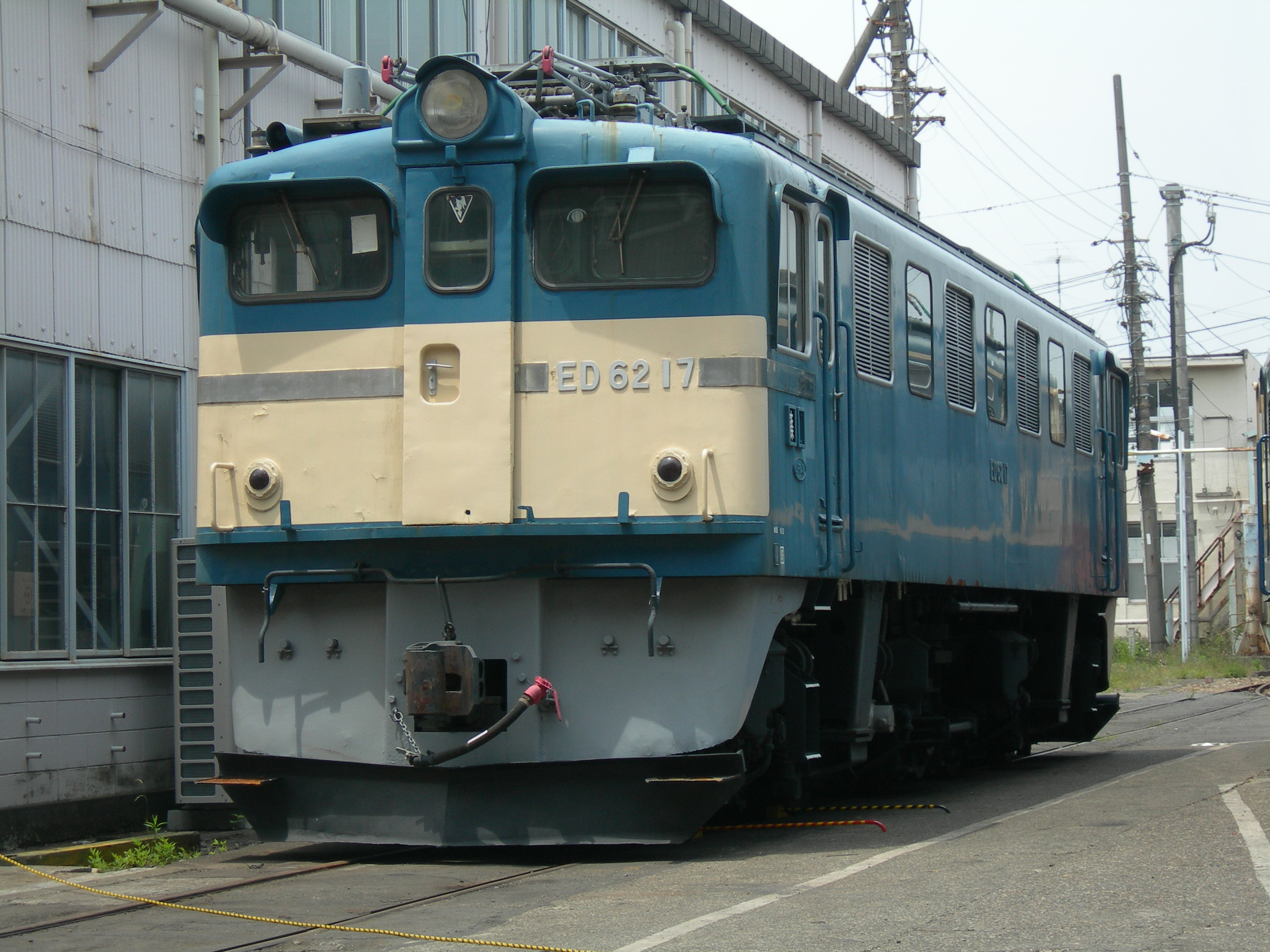
ED62 17 at Omiya Works in May 2008

== See also ==
- Japan Railways locomotive numbering and classification
