= McIntosh & Seymour =

McIntosh & Seymour was an American manufacturer of steam and internal combustion engines during the late 19th and early 20th centuries.

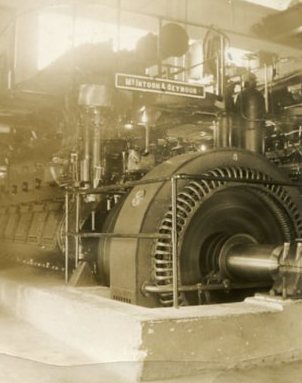
McIntosh & Seymour engine in use with the US Navy in the 1930s.

The company was founded in 1886, and was based in Auburn, New York. It developed and sold a wide variety of steam engines through the end of the 1800s, and by 1910 had begun to build diesel engines to a design from the Swedish company Aktiebolaget Atlas. It primarily produced large engines for stationary generator and marine applications. In the 1920s, McIntosh & Seymour was an early builder of diesel engines for use in railroad locomotives, providing an engine to the American Locomotive Company (Alco) for an experimental locomotive. In 1929, Alco purchased McIntosh & Seymour, and operated it as a subsidiary for some time before the name vanished. Under Alco ownership, McIntosh & Seymour designed and built Alco's first production diesel engine, the 531.

The company's archives are held by the Smithsonian Institution, covering the period from circa 1886-1939.
