= St. Louis Car Company Doodlebug =

Streamlined diesel-electric railcars

St. Louis Car Company "Doodlebug"
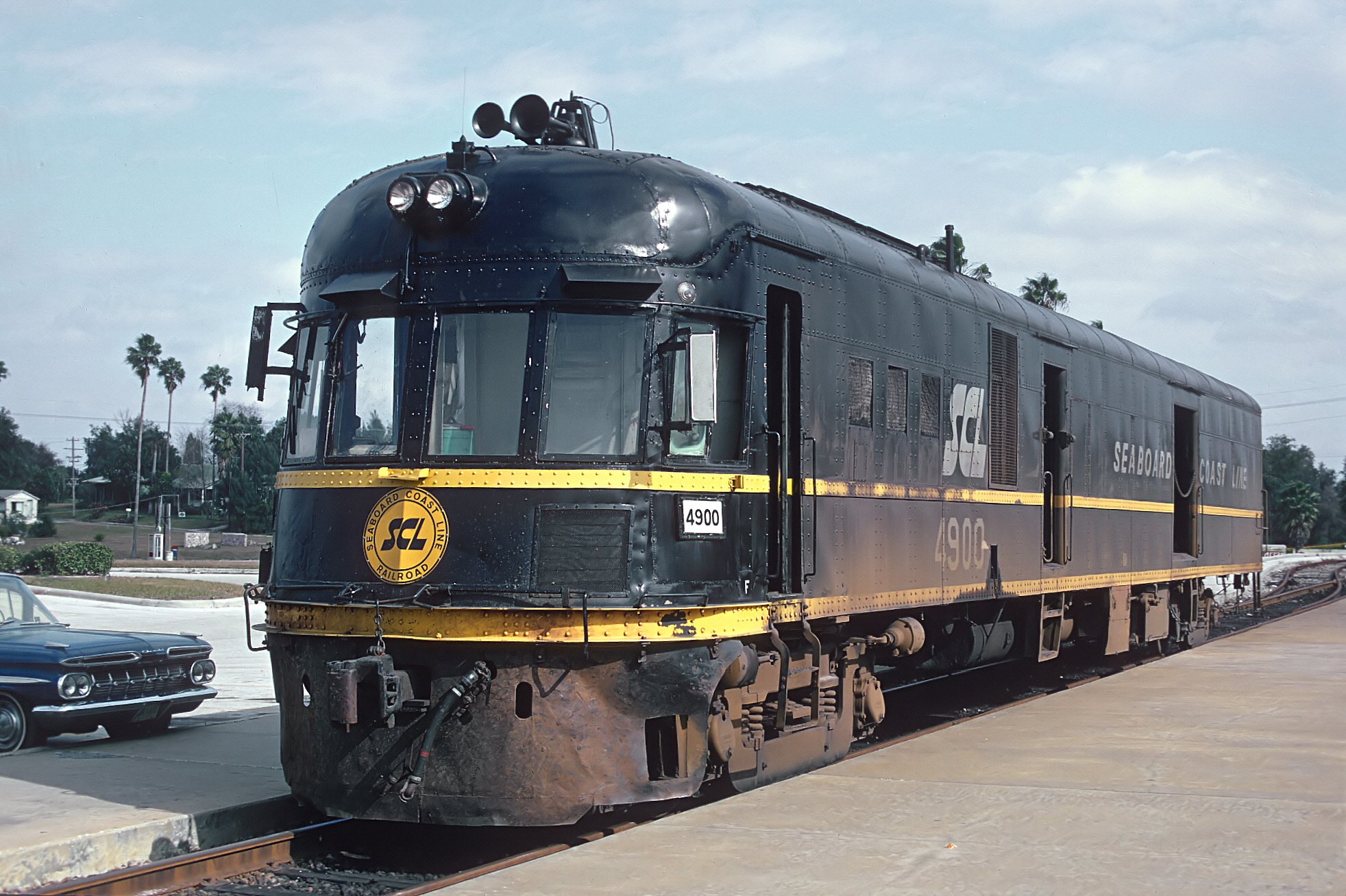
- Seaboard Coast Line #4900 (ex-SAL #2028) sitting at Lakeland, Florida on December 31, 1969.
Type and origin
- Power type: Diesel-electric
- Builder: St. Louis Car Company
- Build date: 1936
- Total produced: 2
Specifications
- Configuration
  - AAR: B-2
  - UIC: Bo'2'
- Gauge: 4 ft 8 1/2 in (1,435 mm)
- Length: 74 ft 2 in (22.61 m)
- Width: 9 ft 9 3/8 in (2.98 m)
- Height: 13 ft 2 1/4 in (4.02 m)
- Loco weight: 175,680 lb (79,690 kilograms)
- Prime mover: Winton 8-201A (1936 - 1948); EMD 567 (1948 - 1971)
- Engine type: 2-stroke diesel
- Aspiration: Roots-blown
- Generator: G.E. Type 534 DC generator
- Traction motors: G.E. Type T716 500V DC traction motors
- Cylinders: 8
- Cylinder size: 8 in × 10 in (203 mm × 254 mm)
- Loco brake: Straight air
- Train brakes: Air
Performance figures
- Power output: 600 hp (450 kW)
Career
- Operators: Seaboard Air Line Railroad; Seaboard Coast Line Railroad
- Locale: North America
- Disposition: All scrapped

The St. Louis Car Company "Doodlebug" was a model of lightweight, streamlined diesel-electric railcars built by the St. Louis Car Company in 1936 for the Seaboard Air Line Railroad. Electromotive Corporation supplied the 600 hp (450 kW), eight-cylinder Winton 8-201A prime mover and electric transmission components, though unit 2028 would be rebuilt in 1948 with a more modern EMD 567 prime mover. The units had a B-2 wheel arrangement, mounted atop a pair of road trucks. The aft section was divided into two separate compartments: one was used to transport baggage and the other served as a small railway post office, or RPO (the forward door, located just behind the radiator louvers, was equipped with a mail hook).

Two units were manufactured for the Seaboard Air Line Railroad (SAL) and were numbered 2027 and 2028. Unit 2027 was destroyed in a collision with a gas tanker truck at Arcadia, Florida in 1956. Unit 2028 remained in service, and was primarily used on the Silver Meteor between Tampa, Florida and Venice, Florida through the 1950s and 60s. Unit 2028 was renumbered to 4900 after the Seaboard Coast Line merger in 1967 between the SAL and the Atlantic Coast Line Railroad (ACL). Unit 2028, now numbered 4900, was reassigned to operate the Champion between Lakeland, Florida and Naples, Florida. Unit 2028 was removed from service and scrapped after Amtrak took over national passenger service in 1971.

== See also ==
- List of GM-EMD locomotives
- Doodlebug (rail car)
- FM OP800, similar St. Louis Car Company built railcars, powered by Fairbanks-Morse
