= FM OP800 =

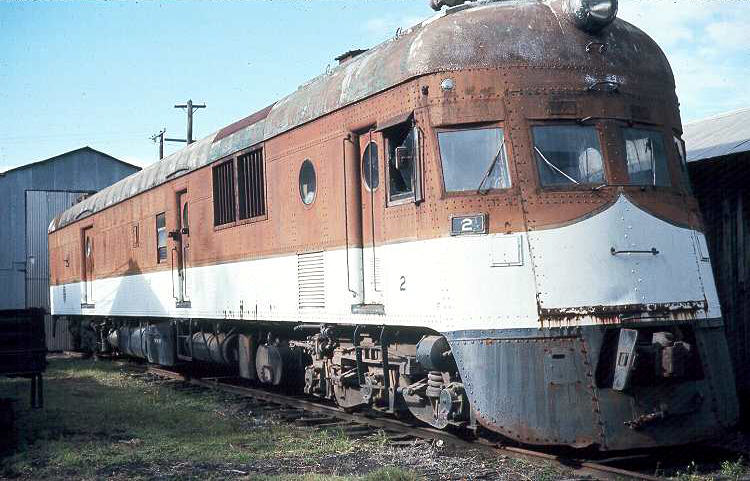
- A Fairbanks-Morse Model OP800 railcar, former Georgia Northern Railway #2.
Type and origin
- Power type: Diesel-electric
- Builder: St. Louis Car Company
- Model: OP800
- Build date: 1939
- Total produced: 6
Specifications
- Configuration
  - AAR: 2-A1A (as built) later 3-A1A
- Gauge: 4 ft 8 1/2 in (1,435 mm) standard gauge
- Length: 80 ft (24.38 m)
- Prime mover: FM 5OP 38F-5-1/4-5
- Engine type: Opposed piston 2-stroke diesel
- Aspiration: Roots Blower
- Generator: Westinghouse DC
- Traction motors: DC
- Cylinders: 5
- Cylinder size: 8 in × 10 in (203 mm × 254 mm)
- Transmission: Diesel-electric
- Loco brake: Straight air
- Train brakes: 6-ET Air
Performance figures
- Maximum speed: 80 mph (130 km/h)
- Power output: 800 hp (600 kW)
Career
- Operators: Southern Railway, Georgia and Florida Railroad, Georgia Northern Railway
- Locale: North America
- Disposition: All scrapped

The OP800 was a lightweight, streamlined railcar built by the St. Louis Car Company in 1939. Fairbanks-Morse supplied the 800 hp (600 kW), five-cylinder 8 in × 10 in (203 mm × 254 mm) opposed piston engine prime mover. The units were configured in a highly unusual 2-A1A wheel arrangement (later converted to 3-A1A) mounted atop a pair of road trucks, and equipped with a front swing coupler pilot. The aft section was divided into two separate compartments: one was used to transport baggage and the other served as a small railway post office, or RPO (the forward door, located just behind the radiator louvers, was equipped with a mail hook).

Six units, accompanied by matching trailing car sets, were manufactured exclusively for the Southern Railway. Two were later sold to the Georgia and Florida Railroad and Georgia Northern Railway as maintenance cars. The remaining four OP800s were scrapped in 1955; selected parts were retained for maintenance use on other SR F-M motive power.

At least four of these cars had individual names applied to them, including "Vulcan", "Cracker", "Joe Wheeler", and "Goldenrod".

No OP800 units survive.

== See also ==
- Doodlebug (rail car)
- Seaboard Air Line 2027 & 2028, similar St. Louis Car Company built railcars, powered by EMD

== Bibliography ==
- "Fairbanks-Morse 38D8 Diesel Locomotive". PSRM Diesel Locomotives. Archived from the original on October 25, 2014.
- Pinkepank, Jerry A. (1973). The Second Diesel Spotter's Guide. Milwaukee, Wisconsin: Kalmbach Publishing. ISBN 978-0-89024-026-7.
- Kirkland, John F. (November 1985). The Diesel Builders Volume 1: Fairbanks-Morse and Lima-Hamilton. Interurban Press. ISBN 0-916374-69-6.
