= ALCO FA =

American locomotive class

ALCO FA and FB
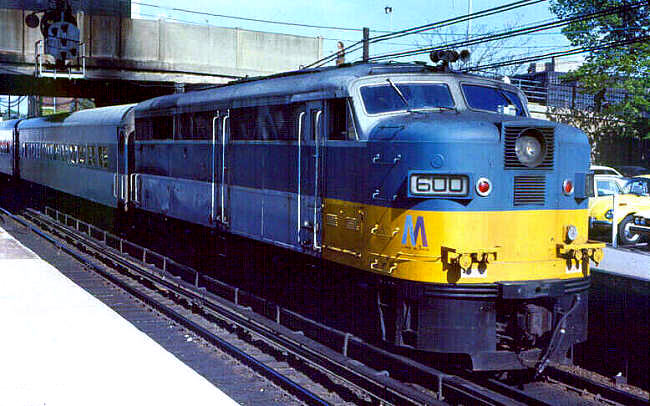
- An ALCO FA-2 of the Long Island Rail Road in May 1976
Type and origin
- Power type: Diesel–electric
- Builder: Partnership of American Locomotive Company (ALCO) and General Electric (GE); Montreal Locomotive Works
- Model: FA-1, FB-1, FA-2, FB-2, FPA-2, FPB-2, FCA-3, FPA-4, FPB-4
- Build date: January 1946 – May 1959
- Total produced: 1,401
Specifications
- Configuration
  - AAR: B-B, A1A-A1A (FCA-3 only)
  - UIC: Bo′Bo′, (A1A)(A1A) (FCA-3 only)
- Gauge: 4 ft 8 1/2 in (1,435 mm) standard gauge
- Length: FA-1: 51 ft 6 in (15.70 m); FB-1: 50 ft 2 in (15.29 m); FA-2, FPA-2, FPA-4: 53 ft 6 in (16.31 m); FB-2, FPB-2, FPB-4: 52 ft 8 in (16.05 m)
- Loco weight: FA-1/FB-1, FA-2/FB-2, FPA-2/FPB-2: 243,000 lb (110,000 kg); FPA-4/FPB-4: 255,000 lb (115,666.1 kilograms)
- Fuel capacity: 1,200 US gal (4,500 L; 1,000 imp gal)
- Prime mover: FA-1/FB-1, FA-2/FB-2, FPA-2/FPB-2: ALCO 12-244; FPA-4/FPB-4: ALCO 12-251
- Engine type: V-12 Four-stroke diesel
- Aspiration: Turbocharger
- Displacement: 8,016 cu in (131.36 L)
- Generator: DC generator
- Traction motors: DC traction motors GE 726 on GM&O initial order then GE 752
- Cylinders: 12
- Cylinder size: 9 in × 10.5 in (229 mm × 267 mm)
- Transmission: Electric
- Loco brake: Independent air. Optional: Dynamic
- Train brakes: Air
Performance figures
- Maximum speed: 65–92 mph (105–148 km/h)
- Power output: Early FA-1/FB-1: 1,500 hp (1,100 kW); Late FA-1/FB-1 & all FA-2/FB-2/FPA-2/FPB-2: 1,600 hp (1,200 kW); FPA-4/FPB-4: 1,800 hp (1,300 kW)
- Tractive effort: FA-1/FB-1, FA-2/FB-2, FPA-2/FPB-2: 60,875 lbf (270.79 kN); FPA-4/FPB-4: 63,750 lbf (283.57 kN)
Career
- Locale: North America, Brazil, Pakistan, México
- Disposition: Many preserved, some under restoration, rest scrapped.

The ALCO FA is a family of B-B diesel locomotives designed to haul freight trains. The locomotives were built by a partnership of ALCO and General Electric in Schenectady, New York, between January 1946 and May 1959. Designed by General Electric's Ray Patten (along with their ALCO PA cousins), they were of a cab unit design; both cab-equipped lead (A unit) FA and cabless booster (B unit) FB models were built. A dual-service passenger-freight version, the FPA/FPB, was also offered. That model was equipped with a steam generator for heating passenger cars.

ALCO's designation of F marks these locomotives as being geared primarily for freight use, whereas the P designation of the PA sets indicates that they were geared for higher speeds and passenger use. However, beyond this their design was largely similar - aside from the PA/PB's both being larger A1A-A1A types with an even more striking nose - and many railroads used FA and PA locomotives for both freight and passenger service.

Several examples of FAs and FBs have been preserved. While most are now in the care of railroad museums, a few remain in operational status on such lines as the Cuyahoga Valley Scenic Railroad, Grand Canyon Railway and the Napa Valley Wine Train.

== Service history ==
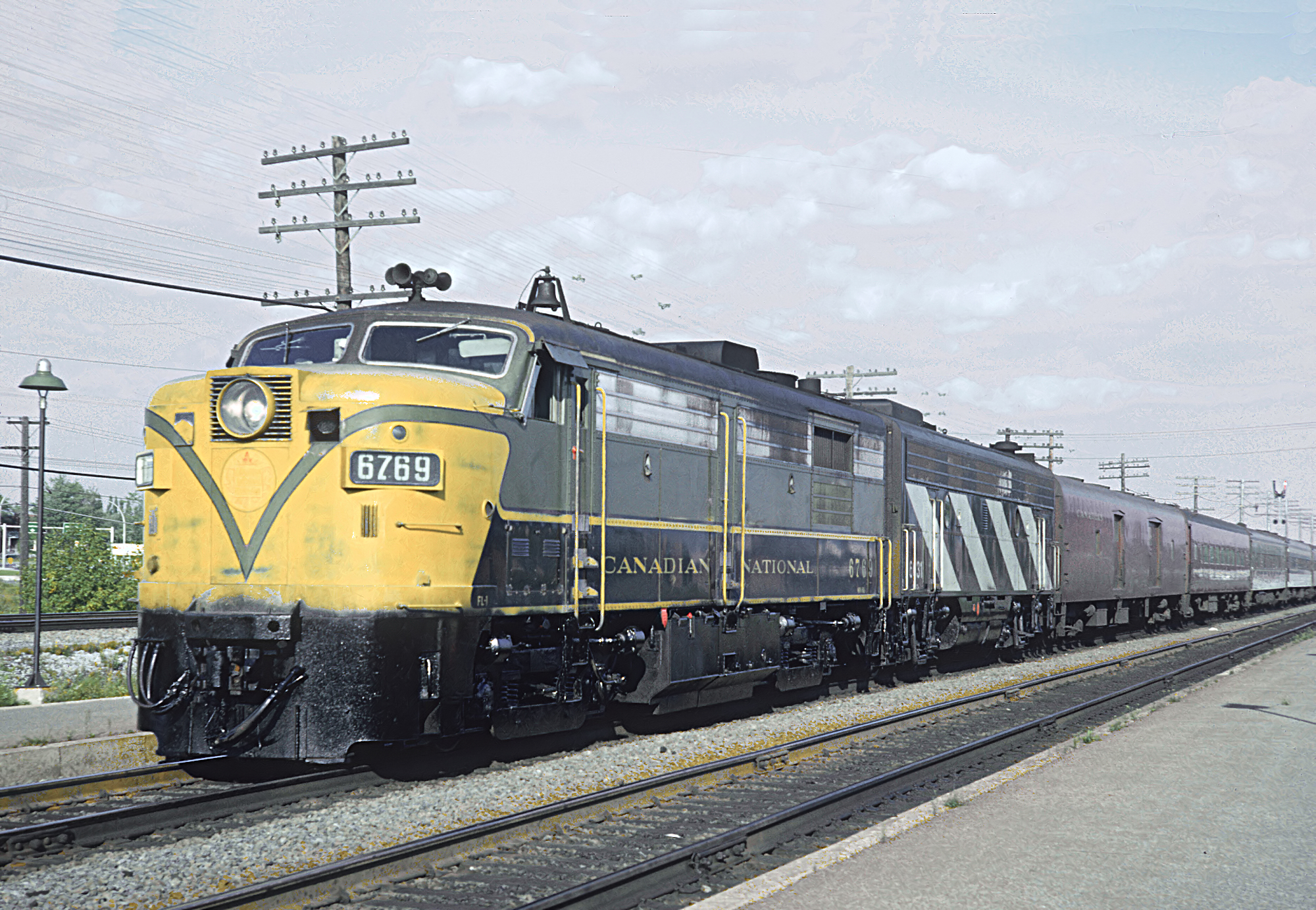
A MLW FPA-4 of the Canadian National Railway in September 1965

Three different models were offered. The FA-1/FB-1, which featured a 1,500 horsepower (1,100 kW) rating, was built from January 1946 to October 1950, with a 1,600 hp (1,200 kW) version produced between March and August 1950 (many early models were subsequently upgraded to 1,600 hp). The 1,600 hp (1,200 kW) FA-2/FB-2 (along with the FPA-2/FPB-2 variants) was built between October 1950 and June 1956. Finally, the 1,800 hp (1,300 kW) FPA-4/FPB-4, powered by the 251 V-12 engine, was built between October 1958 and May 1959 by ALCO's Canadian subsidiary, Montreal Locomotive Works (MLW).

The FAs, as well as their cousins, the ALCO PAs, were born as a result of ALCO's development of a new diesel engine design, the Model 244. In early 1944, development started on the new design, and by November 1945, the first engines were beginning to undergo tests. This unusually short testing sequence was brought about by the decision of ALCO's senior management that the engine and an associated line of road locomotives had to be introduced no later than the end of 1946.

In preparation for this deadline, by January 1946, the first four locomotives with the 244 engines had been built. Two FA-1s and an FB-1 were painted in ALCO Demonstrator colors and were released for road tests for a month and a half on the Delaware and Hudson Railway.

A strike at ALCO delayed production beyond the first four units and the three demonstrator units began working on the Gulf, Mobile, and Ohio Railroad in mid February 1946. The demonstrators were returned to Schenectady when the remainder of the order began delivery in May 1946.

The GM&O order was completed in April 1947 for a total of 80 units. Before the end of this production run, ALCO upgraded the generators and traction motors in the locomotives, with the first of these models entering service in February 1947 for the New York Central.

In 1950, the Montreal Locomotive Works, an affiliate of ALCO, began production of FAs as well. In the fall of 1950, an upgraded model, the FA-2, was launched. This model featured an uprated Model 244 engine, with an output of 1,600 horsepower. Additionally, the carbody was lengthened, making possible the addition of a steam generator in the A unit to allow for use in passenger service. Models equipped as such were designated the FPA-2/FPB-2.

The first FA-2s were delivered in October 1950 to the Baltimore and Ohio and the Erie. By this time, however, the cab unit had fallen out of favor due to the greater versatility of road switchers, and US production of the FA line ended in 1956, with Canadian production ending in 1959.

From the 1970s until 1999, the Long Island Rail Road used 20 FA units converted into "power packs", which were push-pull cab cars with head-end power (HEP). The traction motors were removed, and original prime movers replaced with 600 horsepower (450 kW) engines/generators solely for supplying HEP. The engineer's control stand was left intact, allowing the engines to be used in push-pull service with other locomotives, which usually lacked HEP. By the late 1990s and early 2000s, the railroad began retiring the ALCOs in favor of new bi-level cab cars and locomotives with HEP installed.

== Original production ==
=== Units produced by ALCO and the Montreal Locomotive Works (1946–1956) ===
Almost 800 FA units were built by ALCO and MLW, with just over 15% of them sold to New York Central Railroad, and another 5% each to Union Pacific Railroad, Gulf, Mobile and Ohio Railroad and Missouri Pacific Railroad. About half as many FB units were produced and sold in similar ratios.

FA-1 (cab) and FB-1 (cabless booster) units
Image	Railroad	Quantity FA-1	Quantity FB-1	Road numbers FA-1	Road numbers FB-1	Notes
	Canadian National Railways	8	—	9400–9407	—	Built by MLW
	Canadian Pacific Railway	8	4	4000–4007	4400–4403	Built in USA for operations in Vermont
	Canadian Pacific Railway	20	20	4008–4027	4404–4423	Built by MLW
	Chicago, Rock Island and Pacific Railroad	16	8	145–160	145B–152B	Re-engined by EMD
	Erie Railroad	22	22	725A, D–735A, D	725B, C–735B, C	
	Estrada de Ferro Central do Brasil	12	—	3201–3212	—	1,600 mm (5 ft 3 in) Irish gauge
	Great Northern Railway	8	5	276A, B, 310A, C, 440A, D, 442A, D	310B, 440B, C, 442B, C	440A, B, C, D and 442A, B, C, D to Spokane, Portland & Seattle
	Green Bay and Western Railroad	2	—	503 (1st), 507	—	503 renumbered 506
	Green Bay and Western (Kewanee, Green Bay and Western)	3	—	501, 502, 503 (2nd)	—	
	Gulf, Mobile and Ohio Railroad	55	33	700–754	B1–B33	700, B1,701 were Alco Demonstrators 1500–1502, also purchased Alco static test unit 702 the 3rd FA-1 built
	Lehigh and New England Railroad	10	3	701–710	751–753	to Louisville and Nashville 332–341 (A) 327–329 (B) on L&NE abandonment
	Lehigh Valley Railroad	10	10	530–548 (even)	531–549 (odd)	
	Minneapolis, St. Paul and Sault Ste. Marie Railway ("Soo Line")	14	—	205A, B–211A, B	—	
	Soo Line (Wisconsin Central Railway)	8	—	2220A, B–2223A, B	—	
	Missouri-Kansas-Texas Railroad	18	—	326A, C–334A, C	—	331A replaced by FA-2; renumbered 82A, C–90A, C
	Missouri Pacific Railroad	30	15	301–330	301B–310B, 321B–325B	
	New York Central Railroad	44	23	1000–1043	3300–3322	
	New York, New Haven and Hartford Railroad	30	15	0400–0429	0450–0464	
	Pennsylvania Railroad	8	8	9600–9607	9600B–9607B	
	Reading Company	6	6	300A–305A	300B–305B	
	St. Louis-San Francisco Railway	32	16	5200–5231	5300–5315	Most where rebuilt with EMD567 prime movers
	Secretaria de Comunicaciones de Obras Publicas (SCOP) (Mexico)	5	—	23031–23034, 23039	—	
	Seaboard Air Line Railroad	3	3	4200–4202	4300–4302	
	Spokane, Portland and Seattle Railway	14	8	850A-1,2–860A-1,2, (even) 866A-1,2	856B-1,2–860B-1,2 (even), 866B-1,2	FA's renumbered to 850–867 and FB's to 200–211
	Tennessee Central Railway	5	1	801–805	801B	
	Union Pacific Railroad	44	44	1500A–1523A, 1542A–1543A, 1626–1643	1524B–1541B, 1618B, C–1642B, C (even)	1500A–1523A renumbered 1600A–1623A; 1524B–1541B renumbered 1600B, C–1616B, C (even)
	Wabash Railroad	10	5	1200, A–1204, A	1200B–1204B	
	Totals	445	249			

FA-2 (cab) and FB-2 (cabless booster) units
Image	Railroad	Quantity FA-2	Quantity FB-2	Road numbers FA-2	Road numbers FB-2	Notes
	American Locomotive Company	2	2	1603A, D	1603B, C	1603A, B, C, D sold to Chicago and North Western 4103A, B-4104A, B
	Ann Arbor Railroad	14	—	50, A–56, A	—	4 units to Wabash Railroad in 1964, remainder traded to EMD on GP35s
	Baltimore and Ohio Railroad	28	16	801, A–807, A; 819, A- 837, A (odd)	801X–807X; 819X-837X (odd), 817AX, 837AX	
	Canadian National Railways	25	15	9408–9456 (even)	9409–9437 (odd)	Built by MLW
	Canadian Pacific Railway	20	6	4042–4051, 4084–4093	4465–4470	Built by MLW
	Consolidated Railways of Cuba	12	—	1600–1605, 1650–1655	—	
	Erie Railroad	8	8	736A, D–739A, D	736B, C–739B, C	
	Ferrocarriles Nacionales de México	18	24	6507A–6522A, 6519A (2nd), 6534A	6507B–6522B, 6519B (2nd), 6528B-6534B	
	Great Northern Railway	2	2	278-279A	278-279B	
	Gulf, Mobile and Ohio Railroad	—	4	—	B34–B37	
	Louisville and Nashville Railroad	39	14	300–321, 353–369	200–211, 330–331	
	Lehigh Valley Railroad	6	2	580–588,592 (even)	581,585 (odd)	
Missouri-Kansas-Texas Railroad	1	—	331A (2nd)	—		
	Missouri Pacific Railroad	43	34	331–360, 374-386	331B–335B, 345B–356B, 370B–386B	
	New York Central Railroad	80	50	1044–1123	3323–3372	
	New York, New Haven and Hartford Railroad	—	5	—	0465–0469	
	Pennsylvania Railroad	24	12	9608A–9631A	9608B–9630B (even)	
	Secretaria de Comunicaciones de Obras Publicas (SCOP) (Mexico)	6	—	7121-8–7121-13	—	
	Spokane, Portland and Seattle Railway	2	2	868A-1,2	868B-1,2	FA's to 868–869 FB's to 212–213
	Western Maryland Railway	4	—	301–304	—	
	Totals	334	194			

FCA-3 (cab) and FCB-3 (cabless booster) units
Image	Railroad	Quantity FCA-3	Quantity FCB-3	Road numbers FCA-3	Road numbers FCB-3	Notes
	Pakistan Railways	23	0	DE2001-2023		Alco exported 14 in 1951 and 9 in 1953

=== Units produced by ALCO and the Montreal Locomotive Works (1950–1959) ===
ALCO and MLW built 152 of the various FP models with the largest quantity, 38% of the total production, sold to Canadian National Railway.

FPA-2 (cab) and FPB-2 (cabless booster) units
Image	Railroad	Quantity FPA-2	Quantity FPB-2	Road numbers FPA-2	Road numbers FPB-2	Notes
	Baltimore and Ohio	10	5	809, A-817, A (odd)	809X-817X (odd)	
	Canadian National Railways	6	6	6706–6711	6806–6811	2 A and 2 B units rebuilt to 2 FPA4M and 2 FPB4M in 1955, Built by MLW. Two FPA-2 rebuilt as FPB-2U were 6758 and 6759. 6758 previously numbered as 6755 and delivered new as FPA-2 6711. 6759 previously 6751 and delivered new as FPA-2 6707. FPB-2U transferred to VIA Rail. Retired by VIA in 1987, 6758 is still used by New York and Lake Erie Railroad.
	Canadian Pacific Railway	7	2	4082–4083, 4094–4098	4463–4464	Built by MLW
	Ferrocarriles Nacionales de México	18	10	6500–6501, 6502A–6506A, 6523A–6533A	6502B–6506B, 6523B–6527B	built by Alco and MLW
	Ferrocarril del Pacifico	4	—	901–904	—	Built by Alco
	Great Northern Railway	2		277A, B		
	Lehigh Valley Railroad	2	2	590, 594	583, 587	594 and 583 were used to field test the new 12V-251 engines in 1954-55
	Louisville and Nashville Railroad	5	—	350–352, 383–384	—	
	Missouri Pacific Railroad	19	6	361–373, 387–392	387B–392B	
	Totals	73	33			

FPA-4 (cab) and FPB-4 (cabless booster) units
Image	Railroad	Quantity FPA-4	Quantity FPB-4	Road numbers FPA-4	Road numbers FPB-4	Notes
	Canadian National Railways	34	12	6760–6793	6860–6871	Built by MLW. All transferred to VIA Rail. Few MLW FPA-4 units sold privately to US.

== Surviving examples ==
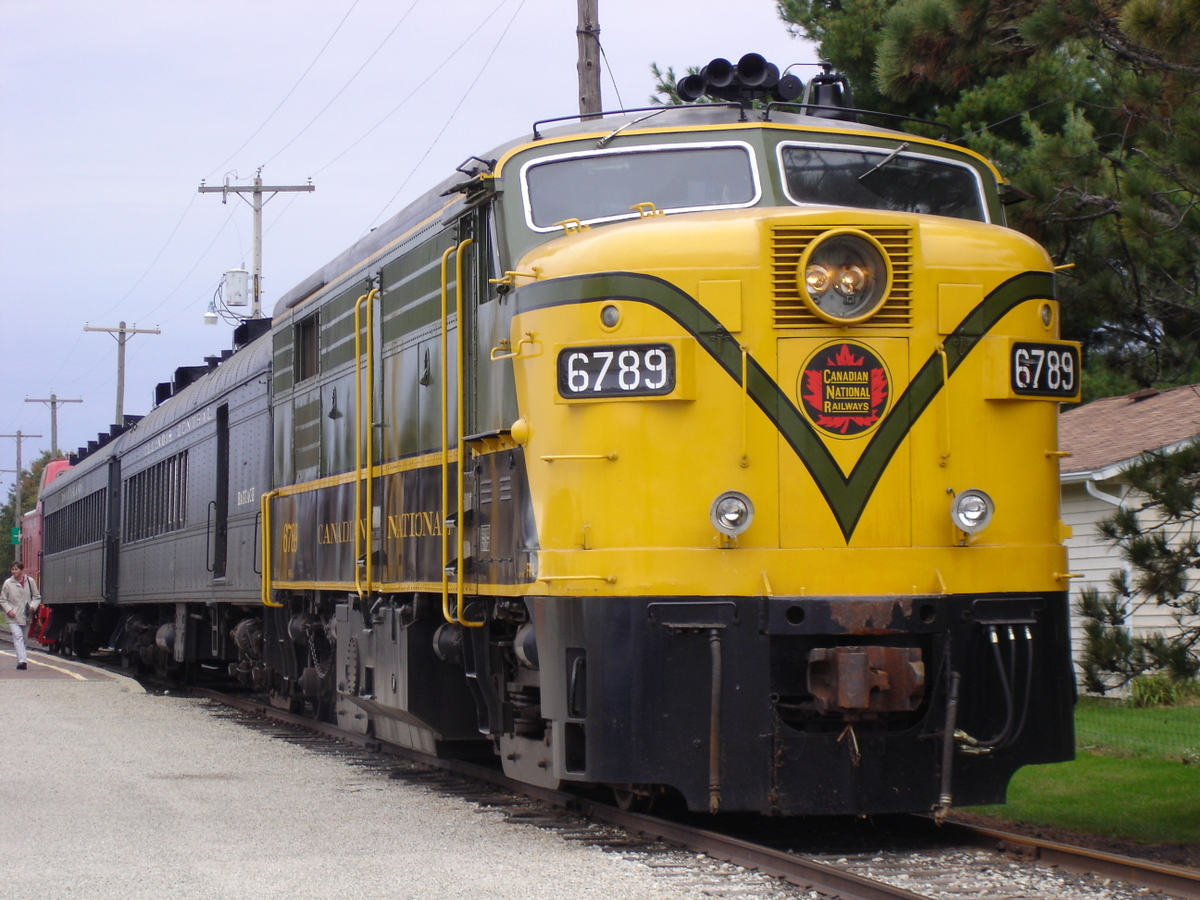
CN FPA-4 No. 6789 at the Monticello Railway Museum in 2006

Some 20 units of various designations exist today in a preserved state. Several excursion railways own operating examples which are in regular service, including MLW units received from Via Rail Canada.

- The Grand Canyon Railway owns two FPA-4s, and one FB-1, of which two (one FPA-4 and one FB-1) currently remain in service.
- The Napa Valley Wine Train owns 4 FPA-4s. However all are expected to be withdrawn from service in favor of new locomotives.
- The Cuyahoga Valley Scenic Railroad in Peninsula, Ohio, owns four FPA-4s and one FPB-4, of which three FPA-4s are in operation as of 2026. Two FPA-4s are planned to be rebuilt as battery-electric locomotives.
- The New York and Lake Erie Railroad owns one FPA-2 and one FPA-4. Ex-CN/VIA Rail 6758 was FPA-2 but rebuilt and is now a FPA-2U.

Locomotives not sold to tourist railroads have been sold to museums and other owners.

- The Illinois Railway Museum owns former Louisville & Nashville FA-2 #314.
- The Western Maryland Railway Historical Society owns former Western Maryland FA-2 #302.
- The Railroad Museum of New England owns former New York, New Haven, & Hartford FA-1 #0401.
- Western NY HS in Buffalo, New York owns a former New York Central FA-2, #1102/ PC1302.
- Spokane Portland & Seattle FB-2 868B is owned by a private owner in NJ.
- The Canadian Railway Museum in Delson, Quebec owns CN FPA-4 #6765 and CN FA-1 #9400.
- The Danbury Railway Museum owns an FPA-4 and FPB-4. They have been restored as Canadian National FPA-4 6786 and FPB-4 #6867. Also at the Danbury Railway Museum is ex-New Haven FA-1 0428.
- The Monticello Railway Museum houses privately owned CN 6789, an MLW FPA-4, and CN 6862, an MLW FPB-4. The A-B set was restored into operating condition and CN 6789 is used on museum trains. Both have been repainted into the green/yellow scheme that CN used early on.
- Canadian Pacific FA-2 4090 and FB-2 4469 survive as static displays at the Canadian Museum of Rail Travel.
- The Adirondack Railway Preservation Society has acquired former Louisville & Nashville FA-2 #309 from a private owner in November 2025. The unit is expected to be moved from the SMS Rail Lines in New Jersey to the Adirondack Railroad where work is expected to finish by late 2026. It was the first known former LIRR "power pack" to be restored back to an operating locomotive.
- The Anthracite Railroads Historical Society owns former Louisville & Nashville FA-2 #315.
- Western Maryland FA-2 #303 was recently sold to a railroad shop in Kansas City.
- Canadian National 6854 is owned by a private owner in Bridgeton, NJ.
- Canadian National 6783 has recently moved to Tennessee.

== ALCO "World Locomotive" ==
=== Pakistan ===
Alco built 23 A1A-A1A trucked FCA-3s for Pakistan Railways in 1951 and 1953. These were the equivalent of an FPA-2 riding on A1A trucks. ALCO's "World Locomotive", the DL500 (introduced in 1953), originated as a newly designed demonstrator based on the FA-2. The first 25 DL500s used the model 244 engine rated at 1,600 horsepower (1,200 kW). Later DL500s were like the FPA-4 and utilize the ALCO model 251B diesel engine as the prime mover and are rated at 1,800 horsepower (1,300 kW). All DL500s were built with C-C trucks, but B-B or paired A-1-A trucks were offered as an option.

=== Americas ===
The only locale within the Americas where ALCO-built cab units, such as All America Latina Logistica (ALL), still see daily usage in freight duty is Argentina. A total of 369 DL500 locomotives were built by ALCO, AE Goodwin, and MLW between May 1953 and December 1967. In Brazil has One in very bad conditions in Station Leopoldina Rio de Janeiro an FA1, that of 1947 and 1948 built, this to be transferred to Deodoro.

=== Australia ===
Variants of the ALCO "World Locomotive" saw service in Australia, where it was built under license by AE Goodwin, Sydney. Six single-cab locomotives were delivered to the South Australian Railways (SAR) in 1955 as the 930 class. In 1957, the SAR received the first of an eventual 31 built to a two-cab design, the end with the second cab being flat-fronted. A few months later, the first of an up-rated version of the two-cab design arrived on the Department of Railways New South Wales as the 44 class, of which 100 were in service by 1968.

Image	Railroad	Model	Specification Number	Quantity	Road Numbers
	South Australian Railways	FPD6	DL-500B	6	930-935
	South Australian Railways	FPD7	DL-500C	31	936-966
	Department of Railways New South Wales	FPD7	DL-500C	100	4401-44100
	Department of Railways New South Wales	FPD9	DL-500G	40	44201-44240
	South Australian Railways	FPD9	DL-500G	6	700-705

=== Europe, Asia and Latin America ===
Similar DL500 locomotives were also used in Greece, Pakistan, Peru, and Spain.

Image	Railroad	Model	Specification Number	Quantity	Road Number
	Northern Railways of Pakistan	FPD3	DL-500	2	2024-2025
	Renfe	FPD5	DL-500A	17	1601-1617
	Peru Southern Railway	FPD6	DL-500B	6	500-505
	General Bartolome Mitre Railroad (Argentine Railways)	FPD7	DL-500C	25	5551-5575
	Hellenic State Railways	FPD7	DL-500C	10	A301-A310
	Northern Railways of Pakistan	FPD7	DL-500C	35	2026-2029, 2044-2074
	Renfe	FPD7	DL-500C	24	1801-1824
	Iraqi Republic Railways	FPD9	DL-500S	5	2101-2105
	Renfe	FPD9	DL-500S	8	2101-2108
	Renfe	FPD9	DL-500T	72	2109-2180

=== India ===
In India the DL500 were introduced as the Indian locomotive class WDM-1 in 1957. They were in service until the early 2000s.

Image	Railroad	Model	Specification Number	Quantity	Road Number
	Indian Railways	FPD7	DL-500C	100	17000-17099

== See also ==
- List of ALCO diesel locomotives
- List of MLW diesel locomotives
