= MLW M-636 =

Locomotive

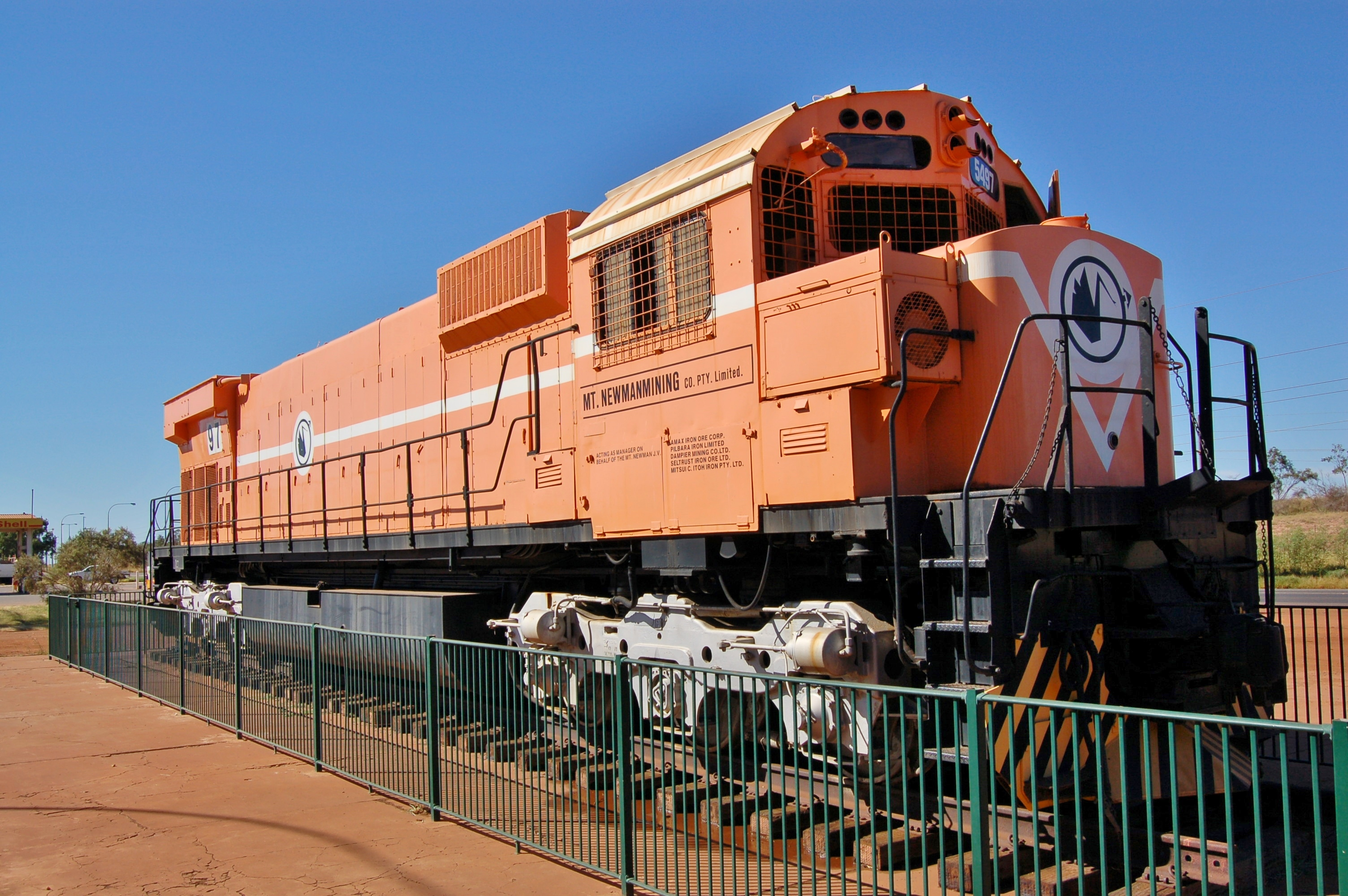
- Mount Newman Mining 5497 at the Don Rhodes Mining and Transport Museum, Port Hedland, Western Australia in April 2012
Type and origin
- Power type: Diesel-electric
- Builder: Montreal Locomotive Works, AE Goodwin, Auburn, NSW (licensee), Comeng, Granville, NSW/Bassendean, WA (licensee)
- Model: M-636
- Build date: September 1969 – February 1980
- Total produced: 185
Specifications
- Configuration
  - AAR: C-C
  - UIC: Co′Co′
- Gauge: 4 ft 8 1/2 in (1,435 mm) standard gauge
- Trucks: Dofasco ZWT-3 Hi-Ad, ALCo Hi-Ad
- Wheel diameter: 40 in (1,000 mm)
- Length: 69 ft 10 1/2 in (21.30 m)
- Width: 10 ft (3.0 m)
- Height: 15 ft 3/4 in (4.59 m) (cab roof)
- Fuel type: Diesel
- Prime mover: ALCO 16-251F
- RPM range: 300-1,100
- Engine type: V16 diesel engine
- Aspiration: Turbocharged
- Alternator: GE GTA11
- Traction motors: GE 752
- Cylinders: 16
- Train brakes: 26L
Performance figures
- Power output: 3,600 hp (2,700 kW)

The M-636 is a six-axle, 3,600 hp diesel locomotive marketed as part of the Montreal Locomotive Works six-axle "M-Line" series of locomotives. It was an evolution of the ALCo C636, and it saw many sales to Canadian, Mexican and Australian customers. Today, there are a handful M-636s left in revenue service.

== Original owners ==
Units built by Montreal Locomotive Works
| Image | Railroad | Quantity | Road numbers | Notes |
|---|---|---|---|---|
| | Canadian National Railway | 40 | 2300–2339 | Units were ordered without dynamic brakes. |
| | Canadian Pacific Railway | 44 | 4700–4743 | |
| | Quebec Cartier Mining | 11 | 71-76, 81-85 | |
| | Ferrocarril del Pacífico | 16 | 651-666 | |
Units built by AE Goodwin
| Image | Railroad | Quantity | Road numbers | Notes |
| | Cliffs Robe River Iron Associates | 7 | 9410–9416 | |
| | Hamersley Iron | 19 | 4030-4048 | |
| | Mount Newman Mining | 16 | 5469–5484 | All were built with ALCo Hi-Ad trucks. |
Units built by Commonwealth Engineering
| Image | Railroad | Quantity | Road numbers | Notes |
| | Cliffs Robe River Iron Associates | 3 | 9421–9423 | 9423 was the last M636 built in February 1980. |
| | Hamersley Iron | 8 | 4049-4056 | |
| | Mount Newman Mining | 21 | 5485–5505 | 5485-5495 were built with ALCo Hi-Ad trucks. 5496 and up were built with the standard Dofasco ZWT-3 Hi-Ad trucks. |
| | Total | 185 | | |

== See also ==
- List of MLW diesel locomotives
