= Class 442 =

Class 442 or 442 class may refer to:

- British Rail Class 442
- DB Class 442
- New South Wales 442 class locomotive
- Renfe Class 442
