= South Australian Railways 600 class (diesel) =

Class of Australian diesel-electric locomotives

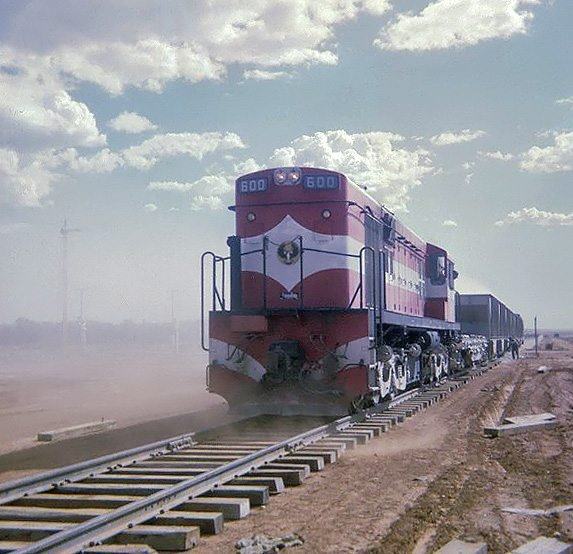
- 600 on a standard gauge construction train in April 1969
Type and origin
- Power type: Diesel-electric
- Builder: AE Goodwin, Auburn
- Serial number: G3419/01 to G3419/02; G6015/01 to G6015/05
- Model: RSD-20 or DL-541
- Build date: 1965-1970
- Total produced: 7
- Rebuilder: Morrison Knudsen Australia
- Rebuild date: 1994
- Number rebuilt: 4
Specifications
- Configuration
  - UIC: Co-Co
- Gauge: 4 ft 8 1/2 in (1,435 mm) standard gauge
- Wheel diameter: 40 in (1,016 mm)
- Length: Over headstocks: 54 ft 6 in (16.61 m); Over coupler pulling faces: 58 ft 8 in (17.88 m)
- Width: 9 ft 8 1/2 in (2.96 m)
- Height: 13 ft 11 in (4.24 m)
- Axle load: 18 long tons 8 cwt (41,200 lb or 18.7 t)
- Loco weight: 110 long tons 10 cwt (247,500 lb or 112.3 t)
- Fuel type: Diesel
- Fuel capacity: 1,200 imp gal (5,500 L; 1,400 US gal)
- Lubricant cap.: 165 imp gal (750 L; 198 US gal)
- Coolant cap.: 210 imp gal (950 L; 250 US gal)
- Sandbox cap.: 14 cu ft (0.40 m^{3})
- Prime mover: Alco 12-251C
- RPM range: 400-1000
- Engine type: Four-stroke V12 diesel
- Aspiration: Turbocharged
- Generator: Associated Electrical Industries 5301
- Traction motors: GE 752 or Associated Electrical Industries 165
- Cylinders: 12
- Cylinder size: 9 in × 10.5 in (229 mm × 267 mm)
Performance figures
- Maximum speed: 75 mph (120 km/h)
- Power output: Gross: 1,950 hp (1,450 kW); For traction: 1,800 hp (1,340 kW)
- Tractive effort: Continuous: 68,000 lbf (302.48 kN) at 7.4 mph (11.9 km/h)
Career
- Operators: South Australian Railways
- Number in class: 7
- Numbers: 600-606
- Current owner: Southern Shorthaul Railroad
- Disposition: 1 Operational, 1 stored, 2 scrapped

The 600 class are a class of diesel-electric locomotives manufactured by AE Goodwin, Auburn for the South Australian Railways between 1965 and 1970.

== History ==
The 600 class were built by Alco's Australian licensee AE Goodwin, Auburn and are based on the Alco DL-541 model. Forty similar examples were built by AE Goodwin for the New South Wales Government Railways as the 45 class in 1962-64.

Two were built in April 1965 for use on standard gauge construction trains and with completion imminent, a further five were delivered in 1969/70. They were the only South Australian Railways diesels to never operate on the Broad Gauge. They primarily operated services between Broken Hill and Port Pirie. They later operated to Adelaide and Leigh Creek. In March 1978, the 600s were included in the transfer of South Australian Railways to Australian National.

From July 1982 until October 1985, some were hired to the State Rail Authority where they were based at Goulburn to operate freight services on the Main South and Illawarra lines. In 1986, a new computer system required the class leaders of the former South Australian Railways to be renumbered as the last member of the class, with 600 becoming 607.

In 1994, four were converted to Booster Units by Morrison Knudsen Australia's Whyalla factory to operate with Australian National's ALF class locomotives. This involved removing the cab and engine, retaining four of the six bogie traction motors and filling the engine bay with 30 tonnes of concrete with the idea of increasing traction at low speed. They were not successful and placed in store in 1996. Australian Southern Railroad trialled BU1 in 2000, but it soon returned to store. All were scrapped in 2009.

When Australian National was sold to Australian Southern Railroad in October 1997, the remaining 3 units were included in the sale. They were later sold by ASR in October 2004 to South Spur Rail Services and were transferred to New South Wales. SSRS sold the business and locomotives to Coote Industrial in March 2007. As at October 2014 only two remained in service. In April 2016, these were sold to Southern Shorthaul Railroad and are currently stored, 602 was returned to service in 2017.
