= South Australian Railways 700 class (diesel) =

Class of Australian diesel-electric locomotives

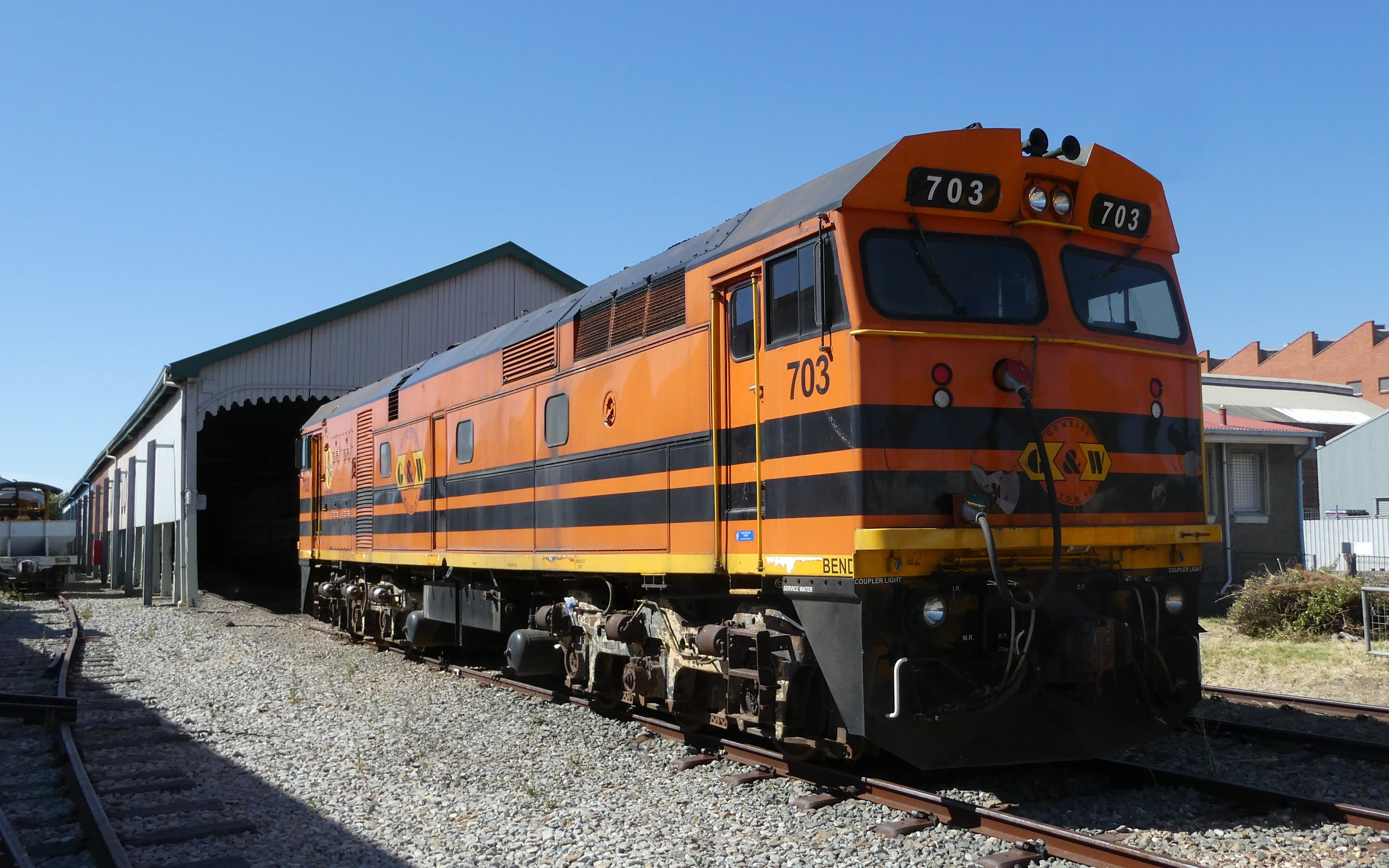
- 703 on delivery to the National Railway Museum, Port Adelaide by donor One Rail Australia, January 2023
Type and origin
- Power type: Diesel-electric
- Builder: AE Goodwin, Auburn
- Serial number: Alco G-6042-01 to G-6042-03; Alco G-6059-01 to G-6059-03
- Model: Alco DL 500G
- Build date: 1971–1972
- Total produced: 6
Specifications
- Configuration
  - UIC: Co-Co
- Gauge: 1435 mm (4 ft 8 1/2 in); 1600 mm (5 ft 3 in)
- Wheel diameter: 1020 mm (3 ft 4 in)
- Length: Over coupler pulling faces: 18.67 m (61 ft 3 in)
- Axle load: 18.6 t (18.31 long tons; 20.50 short tons)
- Loco weight: 111.6 t (109.84 long tons; 123.02 short tons)
- Fuel type: Diesel
- Fuel capacity: 5455 L (1200 imp gal; 1441 US gal)
- Prime mover: Alco 251C
- Engine type: Four-stroke V12 diesel
- Aspiration: Turbocharged
- Traction motors: 6
- Cylinders: 12
- Cylinder size: 229 mm × 267 mm (9 in × 11 in)
- Transmission: Electric
- MU working: Equipped
Performance figures
- Maximum speed: 112 km/h (70 mph)
- Power output: Gross: 1490 kW (2000 hp),
- Tractive effort: Continuous: 311.00 kN (69,916 lbf) at 11 km/h (6.8 mph), Starting: 389.00 kN (87,451 lbf)
Career
- Operators: South Australian Railways, Australian National, One Rail Australia and predecessors
- Number in class: 6
- Numbers: 700–705 (700 later renumbered to 706)
- First run: 22 June 1971
- Last run: 2015
- Preserved: 701, 703, 704 (operational or to be made operational), 705 (static display)
- Disposition: 4 preserved, 2 scrapped

The 700 class is a class of six diesel-electric locomotives based on the Alco DL500G model, built by AE Goodwin, Auburn, New South Wales for the South Australian Railways. They are virtually identical to the New South Wales 442 class locomotive.

== History ==
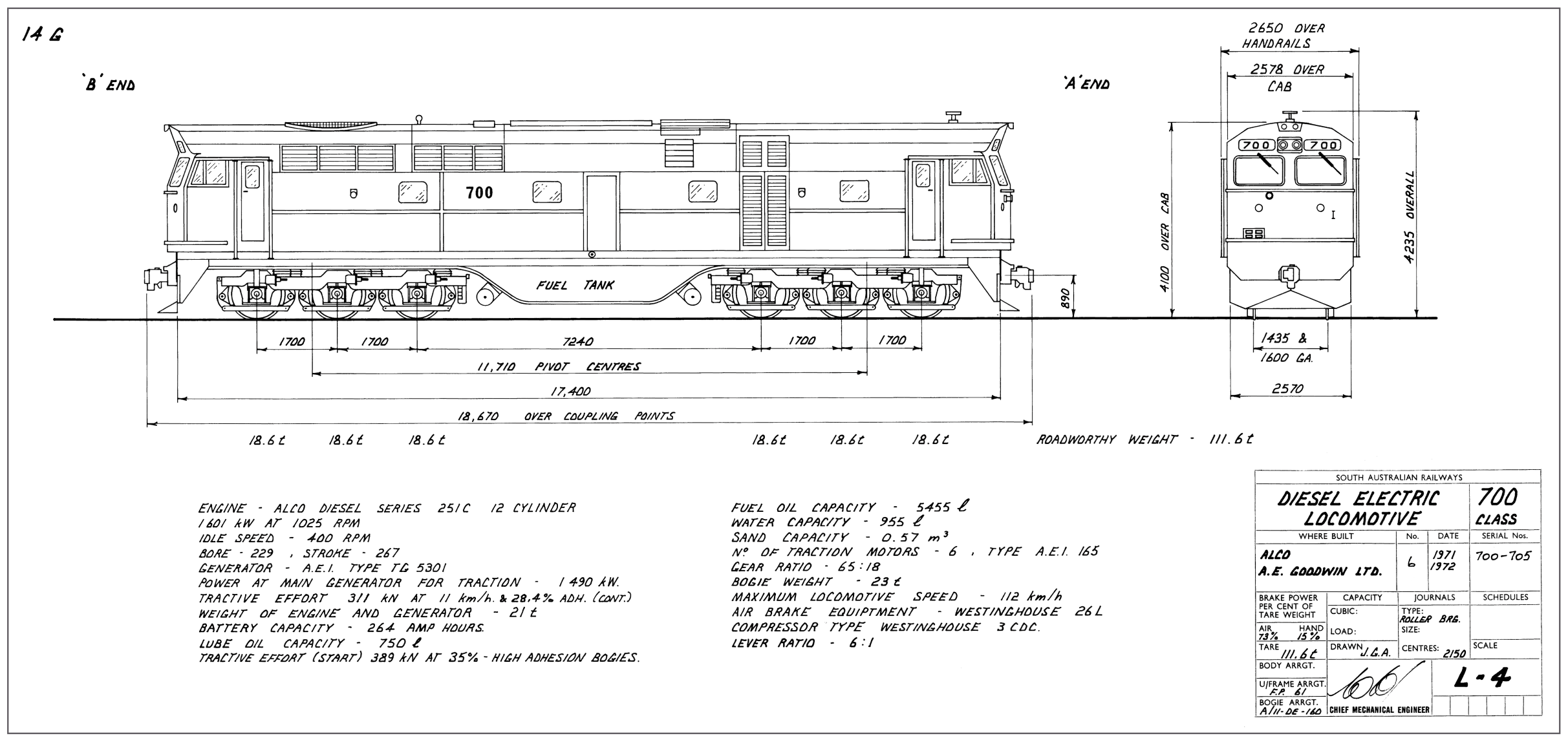
700 class general arrangement

The locomotives, built in 1971 and 1972, operated on all main lines in South Australia and interstate to Broken Hill and Melbourne.

The first three were delivered on 1600 mm (5 ft 3 in) broad gauge bogies and the latter three on 1435 mm (4 ft 8 1/2 in) standard gauge bogies. All were initially delivered in the South Australian Railways' red and silver colour scheme. The three standard-gauge locomotives were soon repainted in the South Australian Railways' "mustard pot" colour scheme (yellow with brown lining and silver bogies).

In 1975, 703 was damaged when a bridge at Crystal Brook collapsed and was repaired at Islington Workshops.

In 1978, all six locomotives were included in the transfer of the South Australian Railways non-metropolitan assets to the Australian National Railways Commission. 703 was transferred back to broad gauge in 1979, to help cover the withdrawal of the first of the 900 class. After the Adelaide to Port Pirie railway line was converted to standard gauge in 1982, all four broad gauge locomotives were converted to standard gauge, marking the first time the entire class was on the same gauge.

In 1986, a new Australian National Railways computer system required the class leaders of the former SAR fleet to be renumbered as the last member of the class; thus 700 became 706. During 1987, all six locomotives were transferred to broad gauge to cover a locomotive shortfall as the older 930 class was withdrawn.

In 1994, 702 caught fire near Blackwood and stored. It was intended to use 44221 as a parts donor for it, however both locomotives were scrapped in 1997.

After the conversion to standard gauge of the Adelaide-Melbourne railway line in 1995, all of the remaining 700 class were converted to standard gauge.

In 1997, the remaining five units were included in the sale of Australian National assets to Australian Southern Railroad. 706 was transferred back to broad gauge in 2000 to work on the daily Penrice stone train. Several years later it suffered a mechanical failure and was not repaired; in 2022 its engine unit was sold to the Australian Locomotive and Railway Carriage Company and its (broad-gauge) bogies were donated to the National Railway Museum, to be placed under 703's body, which One Rail Australia had donated. 704 was transferred to broad gauge to replace it, running until 2014, when it was stored after the Penrice stone train service ceased.

The remaining three locomotives (701, 703 and 705) were mostly used on intrastate grain trains (together with GM and 22 class locomotives), especially on the lightly laid branch lines from Tailem Bend to Loxton and Pinnaroo, where more powerful but heavier locomotives were unable to go. They were also used as banker locomotives to assist trains up the steep grades of the Adelaide to Tailem Bend railway line. 701 was named Tailem Bend in 2014. In 2015, after the Loxton and Pinnaroo branch lines closed, 701 and 703 were stored in serviceable condition. 705 had suffered a major mechanical failure earlier in the year, and was deemed to be not economically repairable.

Locomotive 701 was transferred to Tailem Bend in July 2022 by Aurizon for operational use by ALRCC. It ran a test trial to Tintinara in November 2022 and was used during May-June 2023 to transfer Steamrail Victoria and V/Line carriages to different groups in Victoria, New South Wales, and South Australia.

Locomotive 704 was donated to SteamRanger Heritage Railway by One Rail Australia and delivered to Mount Barker in August 2022 for eventual revenue service.

Locomotive 703, also donated by One Rail Australia, was delivered to the National Railway Museum, Port Adelaide, in January 2023 as a significant display item and for shunt duties.

Locomotive 705 was delivered to the Steamtown Heritage Rail Centre in August 2023.

== Disposition ==
As of October 2023, the disposition of the remaining five 700 class locomotives was as follows:

No.	Owner	Location	Since	Notes
701	Australian Locomotive and Railway Carriage Company (ALRCC)	Tailem Bend	Jul; 2022	Test trips in Victoria, returning to Tailem Bend with four ex-VicRail N type passenger cars, May–June 2023
703	National Railway Museum	National Railway Museum, Port Adelaide	Jan 2023	Donated by One Rail Australia
704	SteamRanger Heritage Railway	SteamRanger Heritage Railway Workshops, Mt Barker	Aug; 2022	Donated by One Rail Australia
705	Steamtown Heritage Rail Centre	Steamtown Heritage Rail Centre, Peterborough	Aug 2023	Donated by One Rail Australia
706	Components: Aurizon, NRM, ALRCC	See note.	Jul; 2022	Body: Aurizon Motive Power Centre, Dry Creek. Bogies: National Railway Museum. Engine unit: ORA Motive Power Centre pending move to ALARC, Tailem Bend.
