= New South Wales 442 class locomotive =

Australian diesel-electric locomotives

New South Wales 442 class
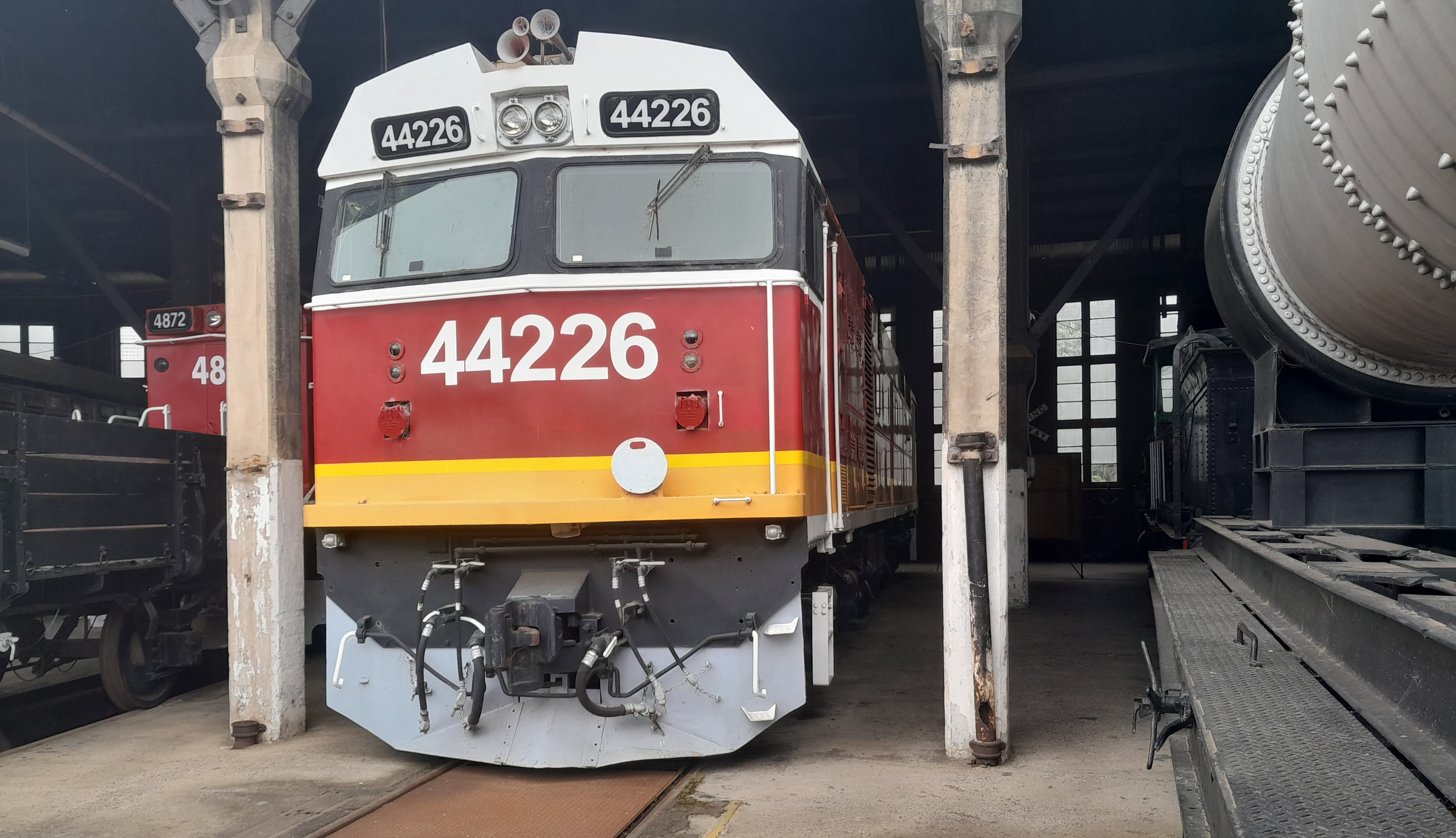
- 44226 at the Junee Roundhouse Museum in November 2025
Type and origin
- Power type: Diesel-electric
- Builder: AE Goodwin, Auburn (34); Comeng, Auburn (6)
- Serial number: Alco G-6045-01 to G-6045-40
- Model: Alco DL-500G
- Build date: 1970–1973
- Total produced: 40
- Rebuilder: UGL Rail, Broadmeadow
- Rebuild date: 2003–2004
- Number rebuilt: 12
Specifications
- Configuration
  - UIC: Co-Co
- Gauge: 1,435 mm (4 ft 8 1/2 in) standard gauge
- Wheel diameter: 40 in (1,016 mm)
- Length: Over headstocks: 57 ft 1 in (17.40 m), Over coupler pulling faces 61 ft 3 in (18.67 m)
- Width: 9 ft 7 1/2 in (2.93 m)
- Height: 13 ft 11 in (4.24 m)
- Axle load: 18 long tons 16 cwt (42,100 lb or 19.1 t)
- Loco weight: 113 long tons 0 cwt (253,100 lb or 114.8 t)
- Fuel type: Diesel
- Fuel capacity: 1,200 imp gal (5,500 L; 1,400 US gal)
- Lubricant cap.: 165 imp gal (750 L; 198 US gal)
- Coolant cap.: 210 imp gal (950 L; 250 US gal)
- Sandbox cap.: 20 cu ft (0.57 m^{3})
- Prime mover: As built: Alco 12-251C; GLs: General Electric 7-FDL12
- RPM range: 400–1025
- Engine type: Four-stroke V12 diesel
- Aspiration: Turbocharged
- Alternator: 44235–44240: Mitsubishi Alternator
- Generator: 44201–44203: GT 586; 44204–44205: AEI 5301; 44206–44220: AEI 5302; 44221–44234: AEI 5301
- Traction motors: 44201–44220: GE 750; 44221–44234: AEI 165; 44235–44240: Mitsubishi MB-451-AUR
- Cylinders: 12
- Cylinder size: 9 in × 10.5 in (229 mm × 267 mm)
- Transmission: Electric
- MU working: Equipped
- Loco brake: Air and Dynamic braking
- Train brakes: Air
Performance figures
- Maximum speed: 120 km/h (75 mph)
- Power output: Gross: 2,150 hp (1,600 kW), For traction: 2,000 hp (1,490 kW)
- Tractive effort: 52,000 lbf (231.31 kN) at 11.75 mph (18.9 km/h)
Career
- Operators: Rail First Asset Management; Qube Logistics; Southern Shorthaul Railroad; Manildra Group
- Number in class: 40
- Numbers: 44201-44240
- Nicknames: Jumbos
- Delivered: 1970
- First run: December 1970
- Last run: October 1973
- Preserved: 44211
- Current owner: Rail First Asset Management; Qube Logistics; Southern Shorthaul Railroad; Manildra Group
- Disposition: 9 operational, 1 preserved, 12 rebuilt, 18 scrapped

The 442 class are a class of diesel locomotives built by AE Goodwin and Comeng, Auburn for the New South Wales Department of Railways between 1970 and 1973.

== History ==
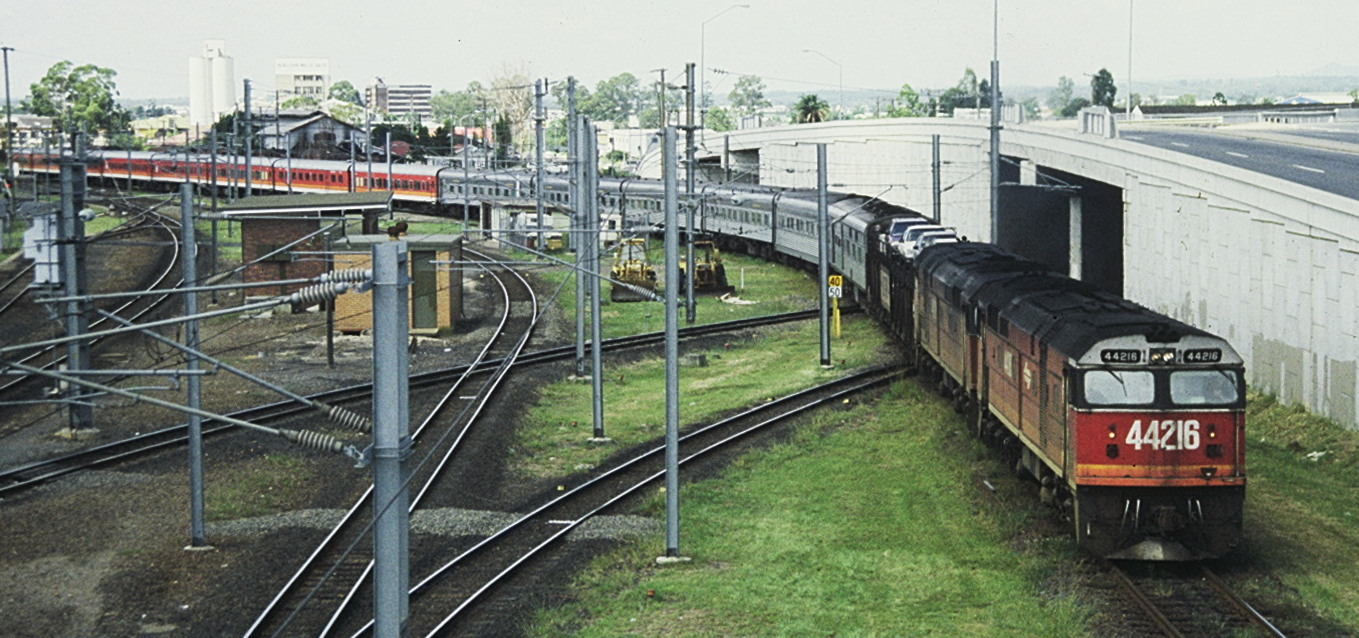
44216 and another haul the northbound Brisbane Limited across the Corinda line at Yeerongpilly in 1987

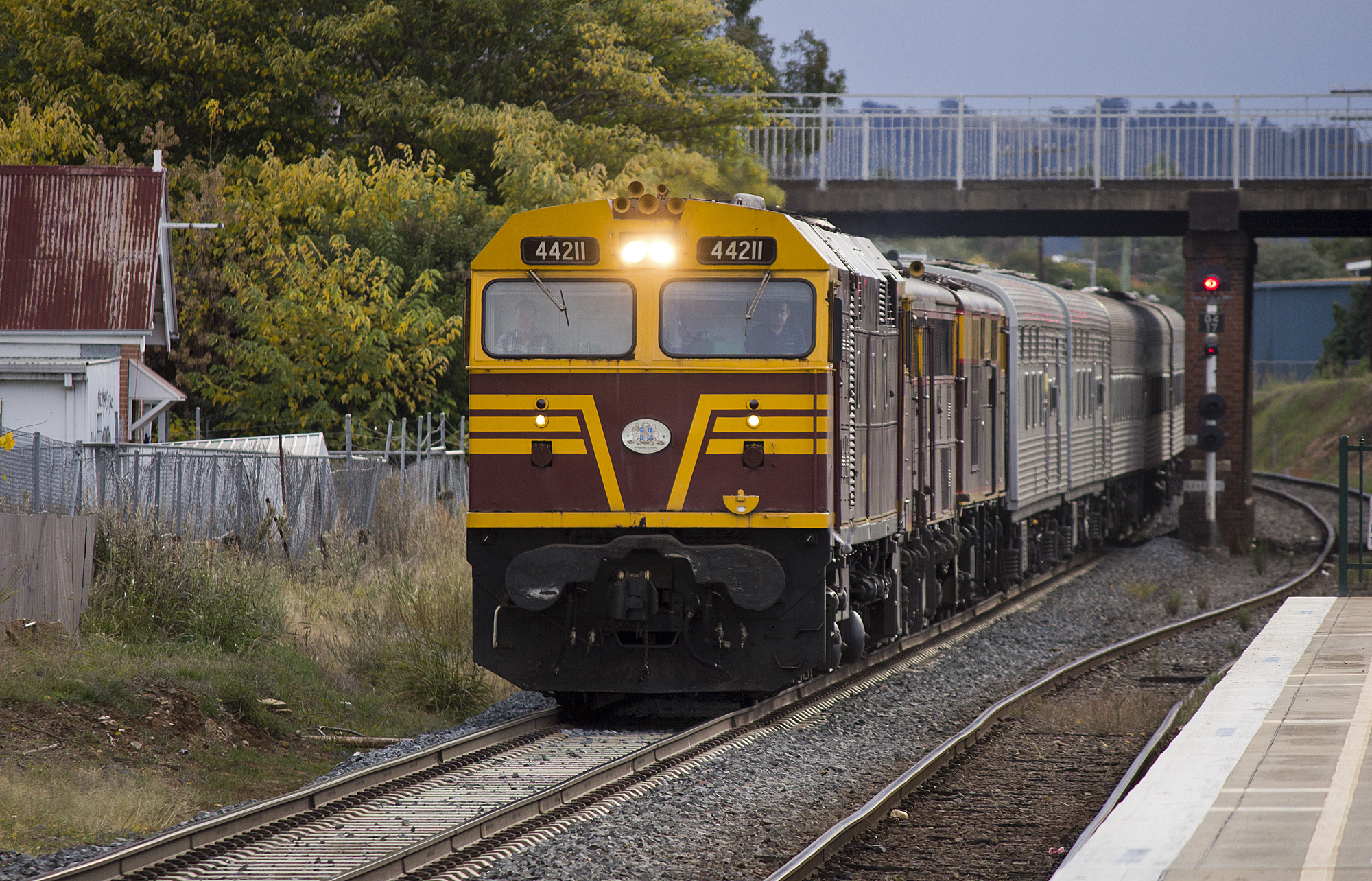
44211 Locomotives At Wagga Wagga Railway Station in Wagga Wagga, New South Wales.

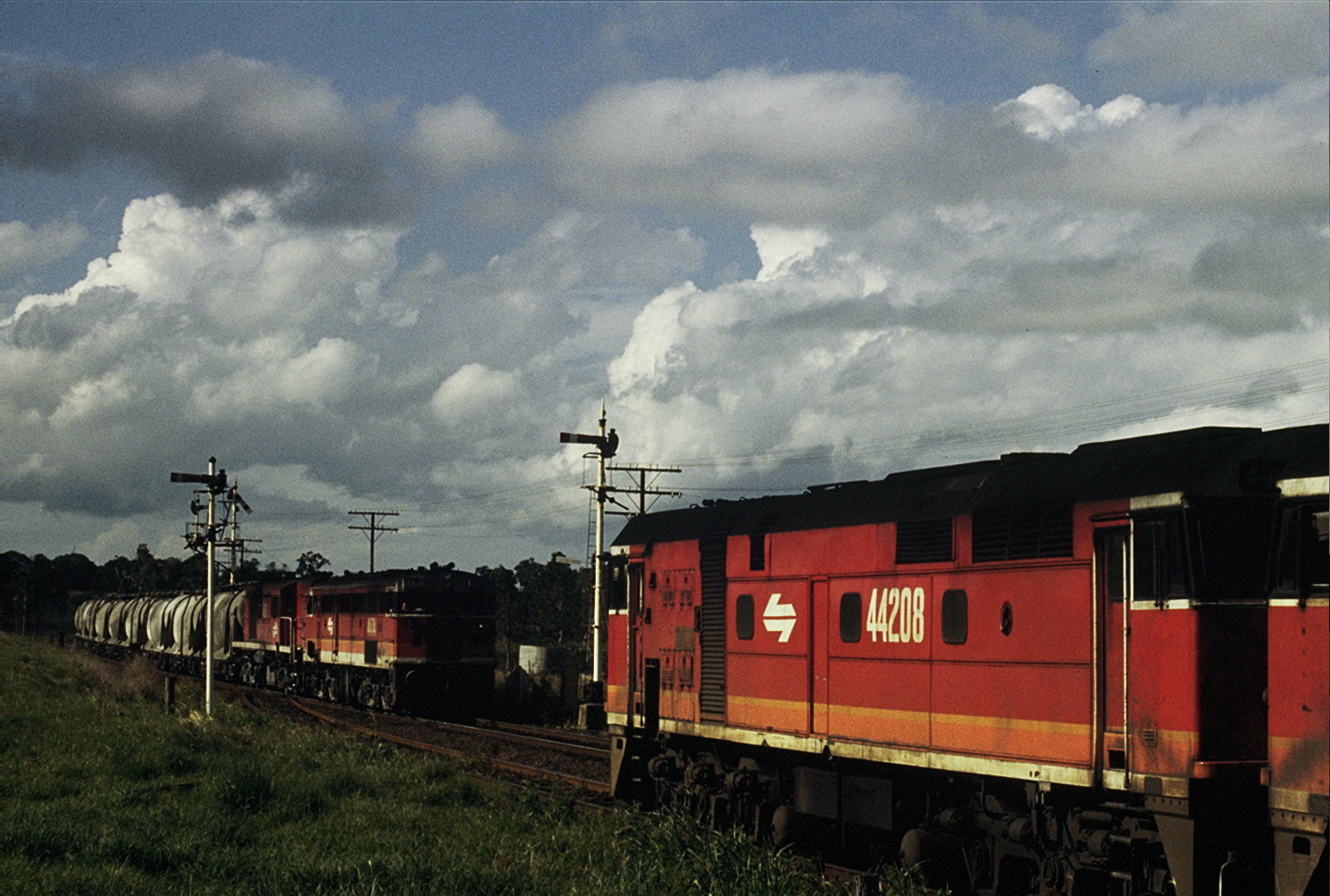
44208 crossing a 44 & 45 class hauled southbound goods train on the North Coast line in 1987

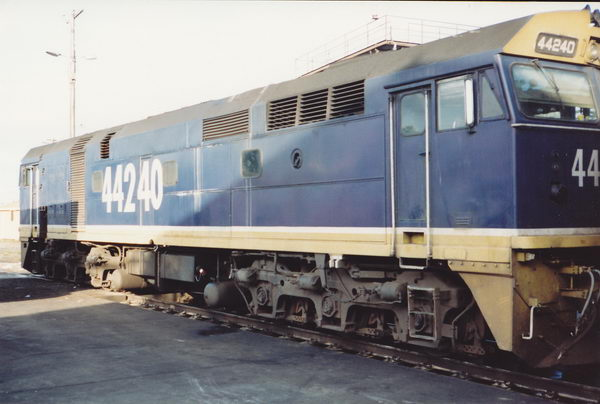
44240 at Broadmeadow Locomotive Depot in 1990

The 442 class were ordered and operated by the New South Wales Government Railways. They were the second generation of Alco units to be built, and were used on both main freight and passenger service in New South Wales. Since entering private ownership they have operated across Australia. They are identical to the South Australian Railways 700 class. They were nicknamed Jumbos, due to their 1971 delivery coinciding with that of Qantas' first Boeing 747s.

== Construction ==
The 442 class were built from 1971 to replace the 40 class locomotives dating from 1951, as they could not be economically rebuilt to modern standards. Twenty locomotives were initially ordered from AE Goodwin, the contract stipulating that the 40 class be accepted as a trade in, with some parts from the older units used for the new locomotives. The contract was later extended by 20 units.

The first locomotive was completed in October 1970 but was rejected due to rough riding concerns in testing, with five months passing before it was finally accepted after modifications to the bogie design.

After AE Goodwin was placed in administration it was sold to Comeng who completed the last six locomotives with a Mitsubishi alternator in lieu of a generator.

== In service ==
The 442 class operated mainline services across the state. In 1985, some (including 23-27, 29 & 30) were fitted with V/Line radios to allow them to operate services through to Melbourne. This ceased in 1987 with those fitted being sent to Melbourne to have the equipment removed.

By the end of their careers, all were based at Broadmeadow Locomotive Depot and mainly operated on the North Coast and Main North lines.

== Disposal ==
Following the delivery of new 82 and 90 class locomotives most were withdrawn in 1994. In December 1994, nineteen were sold at auction:

- 4 to Silverton Rail all returned to traffic,
- 2 to Austrac Ready Power leased to BHP, Port Kembla
- 1 to Australian National with the intention of using as a source of spares to repair fire damaged 702 but the plan was cancelled and both scrapped
- 12 to Morrison Knudsen Australia who intended to rebuild these locomotives to haul roadrailer trains. It was planned to remove the Alco prime mover and generator, and replace it with a rebuilt EMD 645F 16 cylinder engine mated to an AR10 alternator. To allow this the locomotive frame would be cut in half and a new section 1.5 metres long welded into the middle to lengthen it, and the number 2 end cab would be blanked off, making the locomotive single ended. Preliminary work was carried out for the project before it was cancelled in mid 1995 with 10 of the locomotives scrapped at Morrison Knudsen’s Whyalla plant, but some parts were later used in the RL class project. Two were sold to Silverton Rail and entered service in 1998/99.

A locomotive shortage saw six reinstated by FreightCorp in late 1995. After being used as shunters in Sydney, the last were withdrawn in March 1998. One of these (44211) was earmarked for preservation and placed in the care of the New South Wales Rail Transport Museum.

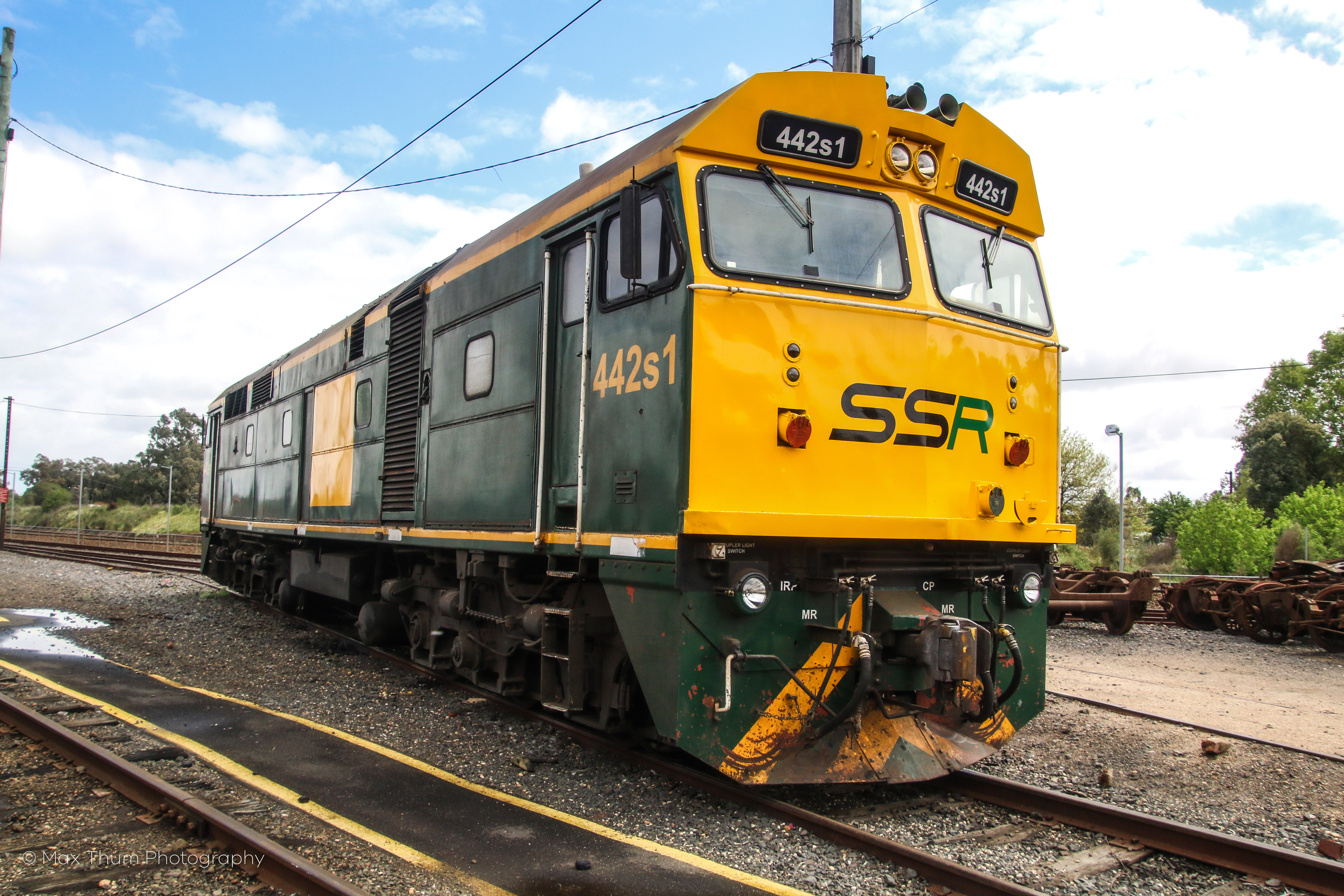
442s1 at Seymour Loco Depot

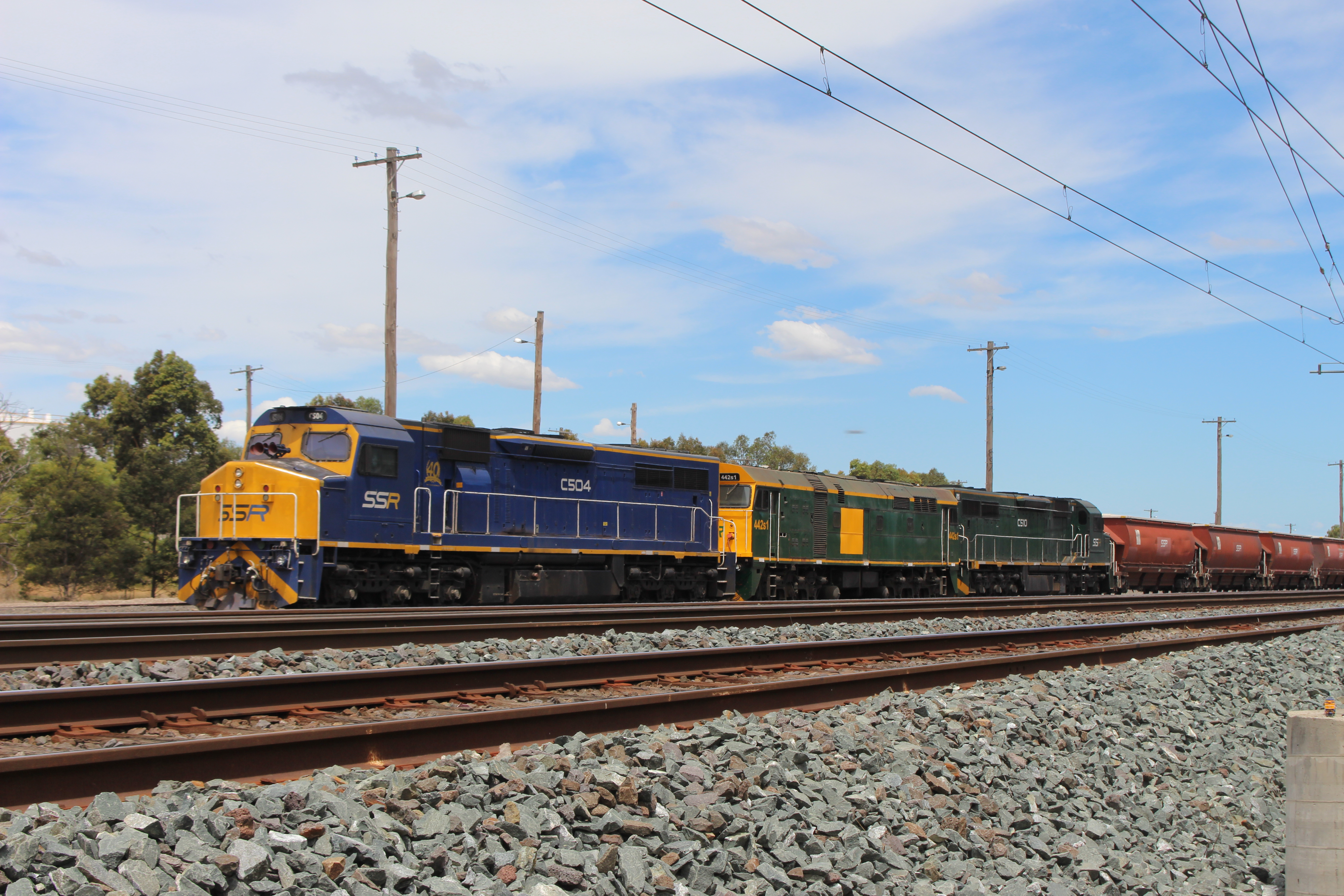
C504 442s1 C510

== Rebirth as JL and GL classes ==
In preparation for the sale of FreightCorp, the remaining locomotives were sold to Great Northern Rail Services, Victoria in 2001. Five were overhauled and returned to service as the JL class. All were sold to Railfirst Asset Management, who contracted UGL Rail, Broadmeadow to remanufacture 12 units with refurbished General Electric C30-7A components recovered from withdrawn Conrail locomotives. They were reclassified as the GL class with all completed between June 2003 and October 2004.

This involved the locomotives being stripped to the bare chassis and remanufactured from the ground up, the only equipment retained being the bogies, main frames and fuel tanks. The original Alco 12-251C engines and AEI generators were replaced with fully overhauled GE 7FDL-12 engines and alternators. New cabs with desk-top controls and improved collision protection and bodies that retained a dual-cab configuration were fitted. The JLs have since resumed their original numbers with two sold to Southern Shorthaul Railroad.

The GLs have been leased to a variety of operators including Bowmans Rail, Southern Shorthaul Railroad, Watco Australia, SCT Logistics, Crawford's Freightlines, GrainCorp, Pacific National, Aurizon and Qube Logistics. All Repainted RFAM silver and blue livery.

== Fleet status ==
Key:	In Service	Stored	Preserved	Converted	Under Overhaul	Scrapped

Some of the locomotives were named after race horses, as shown in the Name column.

Original No	Renumbered	Name	Serial No	Completed	Current / Last Owner	Livery	Status
44201	GL105	Let’s Elope	G-6045-01	Dec 70	Rail First Asset Management	RFAM silver & blue	Operational
44202	442s4 -> 44202		G-6045-02	Apr 71	Qube Logistics	Qube silver & yellow	Operational
44203	442s3		G-6045-03	Apr 71	Qube Logistics	Silverton yellow & blue	Scrapped
44204	JL401 -> 44204	Paul Fitzgerald	G-6045-04	May 71	Southern Shorthaul Railroad	SSR yellow & black	Operational
44205			G-6045-05	May 71	Morrison Knudsen Australia	SRA Candy	Scrapped
44206	JL402 -> 44206	Col Parry	G-6045-06	Jul 71	Southern Shorthaul Railroad	SSR yellow & black	Operational
44207	GL101	Think Big	G-6045-07	Jul 71	Rail First Asset Management	RFAM silver & blue	Operational
44208	JL403 -> 44208	Mark's Baby	G-6045-08	Aug 71	Manildra Group	Silver & Blue	Operational
44209	JL404 -> 44209	Flour Power	G-6045-09	Aug 71	Manildra Group Bomaderry	Silver & Blue	Operational
44210			G-6045-10	Sep 71	Morrison Knudsen Australia	SRA Candy	Scrapped
44211			G-6045-11	Sep 71	New South Wales Rail Transport Museum	Reverse Tuscan	Preserved - Operational
44212	GL112	Jeune	G-6045-12	Oct 71	Rail First Asset Management	RFAM silver & blue	Operational
44213			G-6045-13	Oct 71	Morrison Knudsen Australia	SRA Candy	Scrapped
44214			G-6045-14	Nov 71	Morrison Knudsen Australia	SRA Candy	Scrapped
44215	GL110	Tawriffic	G-6045-15	Dec 71	Rail First Asset Management	RFAM silver & blue	Operational
44216	GL102	Sunline	G-6045-16	May 72	Rail First Asset Management	RFAM silver & blue	Operational
44217			G-6045-17	May 72	Southern Shorthaul Railroad	Greentrains Green and yellow	Operational
44218	GL106	Subzero	G-6045-18	Jun 72	Rail First Asset Management	RFAM silver & blue	Operational
44219			G-6045-19	Jun 72	Morrison Knudsen Australia	SRA Candy	Scrapped
44220	442s1 >>> 44220 (3/11/2023)		G-6045-20	Jun 72	Southern Shorthaul Railroad	SRA Candy	Operational
44221			G-6045-21	Jan 72	Australian National	SRA Candy	Scrapped
44222	GL108	Rain Lover	G-6045-22	Mar 72	Rail First Asset Management	RFAM silver & blue	Operational
44223	442s5 -> 44223		G-6045-23	Mar 72	Southern Shorthaul Railroad	Greentrains green & yellow	Operational
44224			G-6045-24	Mar 72	Morrison Knudsen Australia	SRA Candy	Scrapped
44225			G-6045-25	Mar 72	Morrison Knudsen Australia	SRA Candy	Scrapped
44226	442s6 -> 44226		G-6045-26	Jun 72	Southern Shorthaul Railroad	SRA Candy (inaccurate fonts)	Preserved - Operational
44227			G-6045-27	Jul 72	Morrison Knudsen Australia	SRA Candy	Scrapped
44228	GL103	Brew	G-6045-28	Jul 72	Rail First Asset Management	RFAM silver & blue	Operational
44229	BHP101; GL109	Just a Dash	G-6045-29	Jul 72	Rail First Asset Management	RFAM silver & blue	Operational
44230	GL104	Jezabeel	G-6045-30	Jul 72	Rail First Asset Management	RFAM silver & blue	Operational
44231			G-6045-31	Aug 72	Morrison Knudsen Australia	SRA Candy	Scrapped
44232	JL406; GL111	Galilee	G-6045-32	Sep 72	Rail First Asset Management	RFAM silver & blue	Operational
44233	BHP102; GL107	Rogan Josh	G-6045-33	Nov 72	Rail First Asset Management	RFAM silver & blue	Operational
44234			G-6045-34	Nov 72	Morrison Knudsen Australia	SRA Candy	Scrapped
44235			G-6045-35	Mar 73	Silverton Rail	SRA Candy	Scrapped
44236			G-6045-36	Sep 73	State Rail Authority	SRA Candy	Scrapped
44237			G-6045-37	Sep 73	Silverton Rail	SRA Candy	Scrapped
44238			G-6045-38	Sep 73	State Rail Authority	SRA Candy	Scrapped
44239			G-6045-39	Oct 73	State Rail Authority	SRA Candy	Scrapped
44240			G-6045-40	Oct 73	State Rail Authority	FreightCorp blue	Scrapped
