= New South Wales 44 class locomotive =

Class of Australian diesel-electric locomotive

New South Wales 44 class
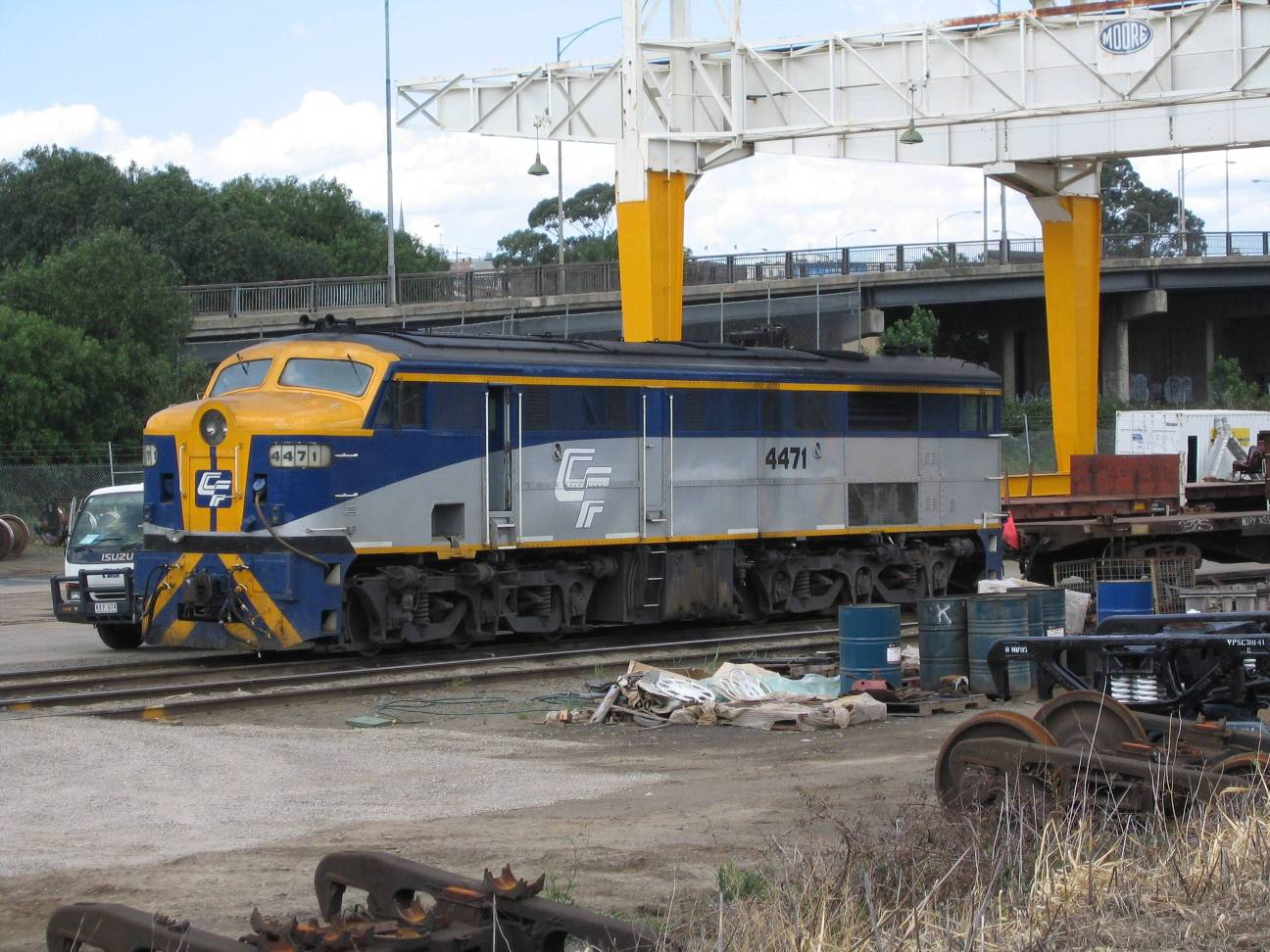
- Chicago Freight Car Leasing Australia liveried 4471 in Melbourne in November 2005
Type and origin
- Power type: Diesel-electric
- Builder: AE Goodwin, Auburn
- Serial number: Alco 82807 to 82912; Alco 83731 to 83750; Alco G-3421-01 to G-3421-40
- Model: Alco DL-500B
- Build date: 1957–1967
- Total produced: 100
Specifications
- Configuration
  - UIC: Co-Co
- Gauge: 4 ft 8 1/2 in (1,435 mm) standard gauge
- Wheel diameter: 40 in (1,016 mm)
- Length: Over headstocks: 55 ft 5 in (16.89 m), Over coupler pulling faces: 58 ft 5 in (17.81 m)
- Width: 9 ft 4 in (2.84 m)
- Height: Max: 13 ft 10 in (4.22 m)
- Axle load: First 60, GE t/m: 18 long tons 14 cwt (41,900 lb or 19 t), First 60, AEI t/m: 17 long tons 14 cwt (39,600 lb or 18 t), Last 40: 18 long tons 8 cwt (41,200 lb or 18.7 t)
- Loco weight: First 60, GE t/m: 112 long tons 1 cwt (251,000 lb or 113.8 t), First 60, AEI t/m: 106 long tons 3 cwt (237,800 lb or 107.9 t), Last 40: 110 long tons 3 cwt (246,700 lb or 111.9 t)
- Fuel type: Diesel fuel
- Fuel capacity: 1,200 imp gal (5,500 L; 1,400 US gal)
- Lubricant cap.: 170 imp gal (770 L; 200 US gal)
- Coolant cap.: 220 imp gal (1,000 L; 260 US gal)
- Sandbox cap.: 16 cu ft (0.45 m^{3})
- Prime mover: Alco 251B
- RPM range: 400–1000
- Engine type: Four-stroke V12 diesel
- Aspiration: Turbocharged
- Generator: First 60:General Electric 5GT581; Last 40 Associated Electrical Industries 5302
- Traction motors: First 60: GE 731 or AEI 253 AZ or AEI 254 AZ, Last 40: AEI 254 BY
- Cylinders: 12
- Cylinder size: 9 in × 10.5 in (229 mm × 267 mm)
Performance figures
- Maximum speed: First 60, GE t/m: 80 mph (129 km/h), First 60, AEI t/m: 75 mph (121 km/h), Last 40: 80 mph (129 km/h)
- Power output: Gross: 1,950 hp (1,450 kW), For traction: 1,800 hp (1,340 kW)
- Tractive effort: Continuous: First 60, GE t/m: 47,100 lbf (209.51 kN) at 11.5 mph (18.5 km/h), First 60, AEI t/m: 40,500 lbf (180.15 kN) at 13.7 mph (22.0 km/h), Last 40: 44,000 lbf (195.72 kN) at 12.9 mph (20.8 km/h)
Career
- Operators: NSW Department of Railways
- Number in class: 100
- Numbers: 4401–44100
- First run: 8 July 1957
- Preserved: 4401, 4403, 4420, 4464, 4465, 4472, 4473, 4486, 4490
- Disposition: 9 preserved, 2 stored, 2 operational, 87 scrapped

The 44 class are a class of diesel-electric locomotives built by AE Goodwin, Auburn for the New South Wales Department of Railways between 1957 and 1967.

== History ==
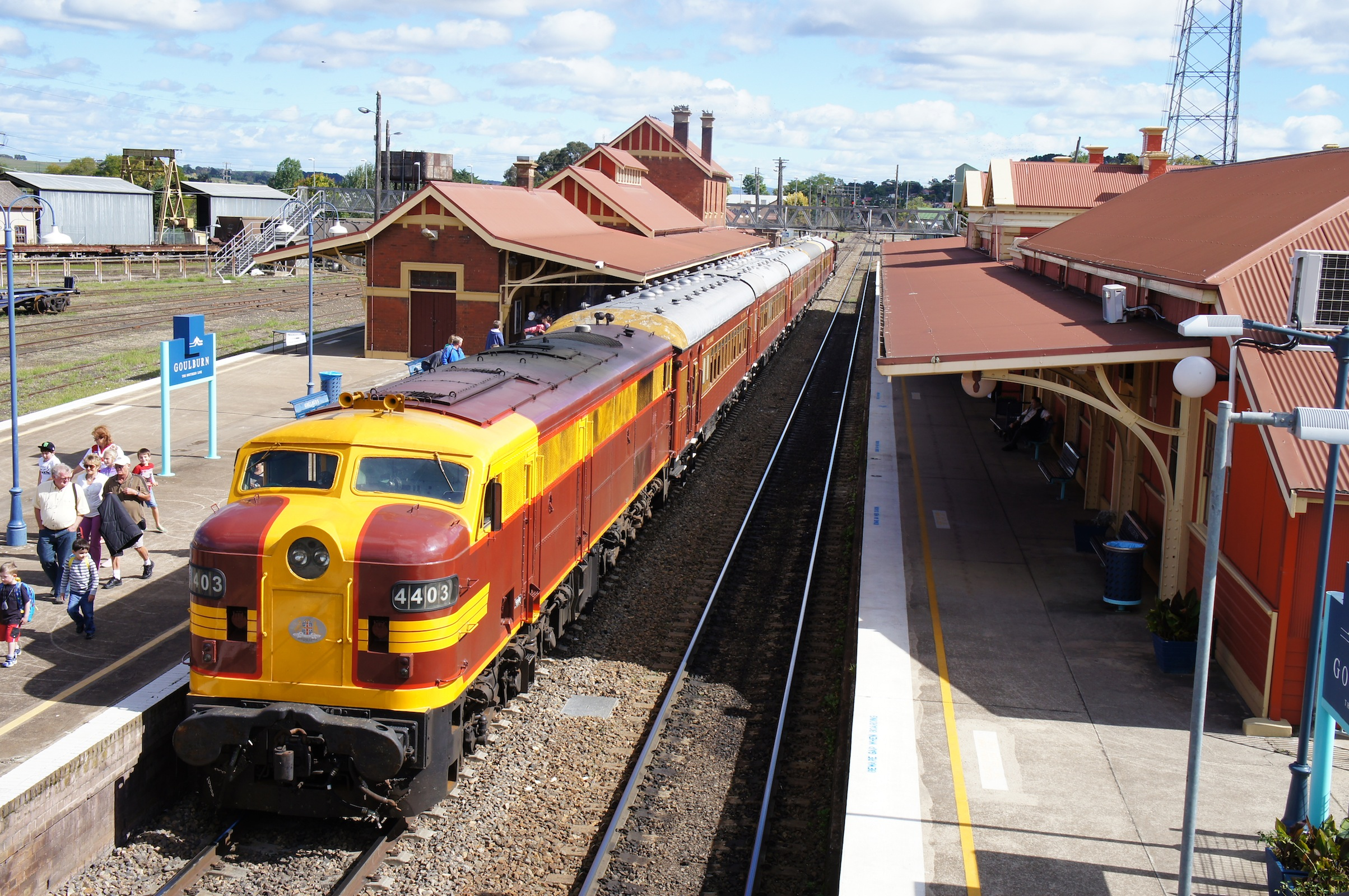
Preserved 4403 at Goulburn in March 2012

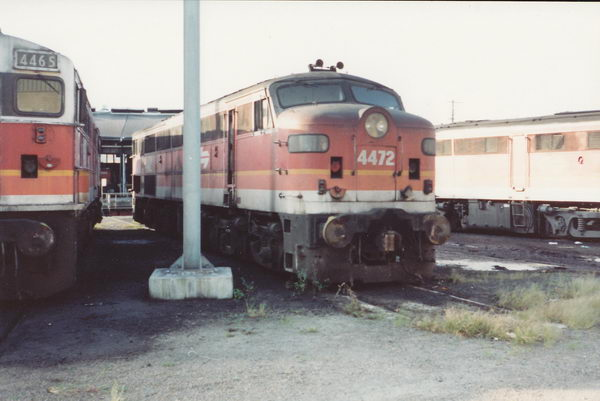
4465 and 4472 at Broadmeadow Locomotive Depot in 1990

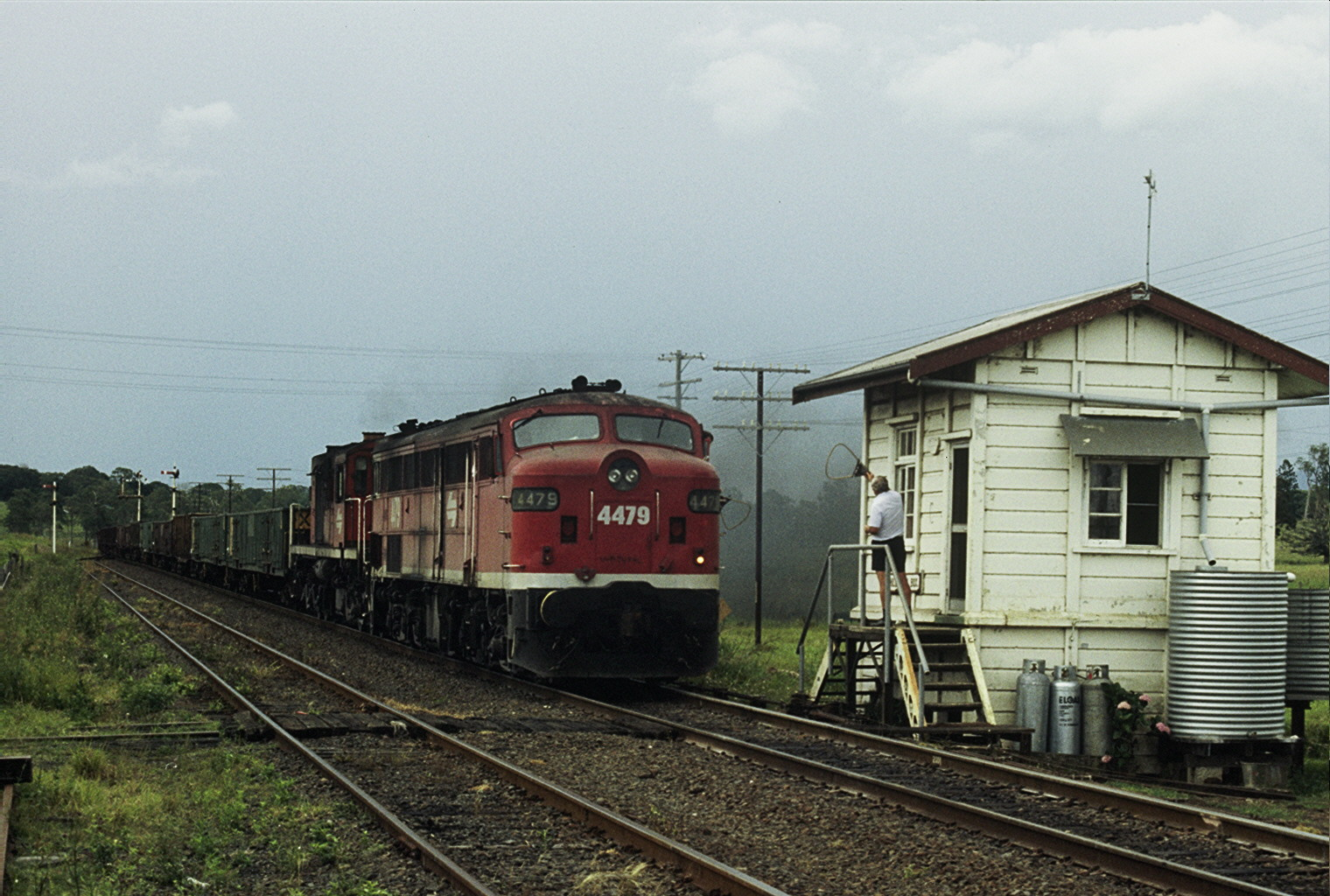
4479 and a 45 class haul a freight train at Fairy Hill, north of Casino in 1987

The 44 class were built by AE Goodwin, the Australian licence of US company Alco, and were based on the Alco DL500B model. The locomotives were fitted with Alco 12-251B engines, developing 1343 kW. They were built in two batches, the first 60 between July 1957 and April 1961 and the second 40 between October 1965 and December 1967. The last 40 had Associated Electrical Industries as opposed to General Electric generators and traction motors, as well as illuminated segregated number boxes at the No.2 end. The model was very similar to dual cab South Australian Railways 930 class, the RENFE Classes 316 and 318 and the Hellenic State Railways Class A300.

With driving cabs within both ends, the front (No.1 end) of the locomotive had a rounded nose (although not as round as the Clyde/GM "Bulldog nose" type) and a flat nose at the No.2 end. During their career, the locomotives served every part of New South Wales and operated every type of train.

In the late 1980s, some earlier examples in need of rewiring began to be withdrawn, but many survived into the 1990s, with the last being withdrawn in July 1997. Over forty still owned by the State Rail Authority were auctioned off in December 1994.

While most were scrapped, a number saw service with other freight operators. Chicago Freight Car Leasing Australia, Great Northern Rail Services, Independent Rail of Australia, Silverton Rail and Southern Shorthaul Railroad all operated 44s, with most ending up with Qube Logistics until their final withdrawal in 2014.

A number of preserved examples are main-line registered and, as well as operating heritage trains, are used periodically by other operators.

Three are on Transport Heritage NSW's Heritage and Conservation Register list. 4401 was in the custody of 3801 Limited, and 4403 was with the Australian Railway Historical Society, Canberra until 2017. 4401 is now in the custody of the Junee Roundhouse Railway Museum, and 4403 and 4490 are with the NSW Rail Museum.

== Fleet status ==
Locomotive	Serial No	Completed	Current Owner	Livery	Status
4401	82807	Jul 57	Transport Heritage NSW	Indian red	Preserved, Static Display, Junee
4402	?	Sep 57	N/A	Tuscan red	Scrapped
4403	82809	Nov 57	Transport Heritage NSW	Candy	Preserved, Operational, Thirlmere
4404	?	Jan 58	N/A	Tuscan red	Scrapped
4405	?	Feb 58	N/A	Candy	Scrapped
4406	?	Feb 58	N/A	Candy	Scrapped
4407	?	Feb 58	N/A	Tuscan red	Scrapped
4408	?	Mar 58	N/A	Tuscan red	Scrapped
4409	?	Apr 58	N/A	Tuscan red	Scrapped
4410	?	Apr 58	N/A	Tuscan red	Scrapped
4411	?	May 58	N/A	Tuscan red	Scrapped
4412	?	May 58	N/A	Tuscan red	Scrapped
4413	?	June 58	N/A	Tuscan red	Scrapped
4414	?	June 58	N/A	Tuscan red	Scrapped
4415	?	June 58	N/A	Indian red	Scrapped
4416	?	June 58	N/A	Tuscan red	Scrapped
4417	?	June 58	N/A	Tuscan red	Scrapped
4418	?	July 58	N/A	Tuscan red	Scrapped
4419	?	Sep 58	N/A	Candy	Scrapped
4420	82892	Sep 58	Dorrigo Steam Railway & Museum	Red terror	Preserved, Stored, Dorrigo
4421	?	Oct 58	N/A	Indian red	Scrapped
4422	?	Sep 58	N/A	Tuscan red	Scrapped
4423	?	Oct 58	N/A	Reverse Indian red	Scrapped
4424	?	Sep 58	N/A	Candy	Scrapped
4425	?	Oct 58	N/A	Candy	Scrapped
4426	?	Oct 58	N/A	Tuscan red	Scrapped
4427	?	Nov 58	N/A	Red	Scrapped
4428	?	Nov 58	N/A	Candy	Scrapped
4429	?	Nov 58	N/A	Tuscan red	Scrapped
4430	?	Dec 58	N/A	Tuscan red	Scrapped
4431	?	Nov 58	N/A	Candy	Scrapped
4432	?	Nov 58	N/A	Candy	Scrapped
4433	?	Dec 58	N/A	Tuscan red	Scrapped
4433	?	Dec 58	N/A	Tuscan red	Scrapped
4434	?	Dec 58	N/A	Tuscan red	Scrapped
4435	?	Jan 59	N/A	Tuscan red	Scrapped
4436	?	Jan 59	N/A	Tuscan red	Scrapped
4437	?	Feb 59	N/A	Tuscan red	Scrapped
4438	?	Mar 59	N/A	Red	Scrapped
4439	?	Apr 59	N/A	Candy	Scrapped
4440	?	Oct 59	N/A	Tuscan red	Scrapped
4441	?	Apr 60	N/A	Tuscan red	Scrapped
4442	?	Aug 60	N/A	Tuscan red	Scrapped
4443	?	Aug 60	N/A	Tuscan red	Scrapped
4444	?	Sep 60	N/A	Tuscan red	Scrapped
4445	?	Sep 60	N/A	Tuscan red	Scrapped
4446	?	Sep 60	N/A	Tuscan red	Scrapped
4447	?	Sep 60	N/A	Red	Scrapped
4448	?	Oct 60	N/A	Red	Scrapped
4449	?	Oct 60	N/A	Tuscan red	Scrapped
4450	?	Oct 60	N/A	Tuscan red	Scrapped
4451	?	Oct 60	N/A	Tuscan red	Scrapped
4452	?	Nov 60	N/A	Tuscan red	Scrapped
4453	?	Nov 60	N/A	Tuscan red	Scrapped
4454	?	Dec 60	N/A	Red	Scrapped
4455	?	Dec 60	N/A	Tuscan red	Scrapped
4456	?	Jan 61	N/A	Red	Scrapped
4457	?	Jan 61	N/A	Tuscan red	Scrapped
4458	83748	Feb 61	Qube Logistics	Silver	Stored, Junee
4459	?	Mar 61	N/A	Tuscan red	Scrapped
4460	?	Apr 61	N/A	Candy	Scrapped
4461	?	Oct 65	Qube Logistics	IRA Simple Red & White	Stored
4462	?	Nov 65	N/A	Tuscan red	Scrapped
4463	?	Dec 65	Qube logistics	IRA Simple Red & White	Stored
4464	G-3421-04	Jan 66	Transport Heritage NSW	Indian red	Preserved, Operational
4465	G-3421-05	Feb 66	John Currey	Candy	Stored, Werris Creek
4466	?	Mar 66	N/A	Candy	Scrapped
4467	?	May 66	N/A	Candy	Scrapped
4468	?	May 66	Unknown	Indian red	Stored
4469	?	Jun 66	N/A	Red	Scrapped
4470	?	Jun 66	N/A	Red	Scrapped
4471	?	Aug 66	Qube Logistics	CFCLA	Stored
4472	G-3421-12	Aug 66	The Picnic Train	Silver & Yellow	Undergoing Restoration, Junee Railway Workshops
4473	G-3421-13	Sep 66	Transport Heritage NSW	Indian red	Preserved, Operational
4474	?	Sep 66	N/A	Candy	Scrapped
4475	?	Nov 66	N/A	Red	Scrapped
4476	?	Nov 66	N/A	Tuscan red	Scrapped
4477	G-3421-17	Dec 66	Qube Logistics	CFCLA	Stored, Junee
4478	?	Jan 67	N/A	Tuscan red	Scrapped
4479	?	Feb 67	N/A	Red	Scrapped
4480	?	Feb 67	N/A	FreightCorp Blue	Scrapped
4481	?	Mar 67	N/A	Red	Scrapped
4482	?	Apr 67	N/A	Red	Scrapped
4483	?	Apr 67	Qube Logistics	Southern Shorthaul Railroad	Stored
4484	?	May 67	N/A	Red	Scrapped
4485	?	May 67	N/A	Red	Scrapped
4486	G-3421-26	May 67	Transport Heritage NSW	Indian red	Preserved, Operational
4487	?	Jun 67	N/A	Red	Scrapped
4488	G-3421-28	Jul 67	Qube Logistics	Silver	Stored, Junee
4489	?	Jul 67	N/A	Red	Scrapped
4490	G-3421-30	Jul 67	Transport Heritage NSW	Indian red	Preserved, Operational, Thirlmere
4491	?	Jul 67	N/A	Red	Scrapped
4492	?	Aug 67	N/A	Red	Scrapped
4493	?	Aug 67	N/A	Red	Scrapped
4494	?	Aug 67	N/A	Red	Scrapped
4495	?	Sep 67	N/A	Candy	Scrapped
4496	?	Sep 67	N/A	Candy	Scrapped
4497	G-3421-37	Oct 67	Qube Logistics	Silver	Operational, Junee
4498	?	Nov 67	Qube Logistics	CFCLA	Stored
4499	?	Dec 67	N/A	Grey	Scrapped
44100	?	Dec 67	N/A	Red	Scrapped
