= ALCO Century 636 =

Diesel locomotives of Western Australia

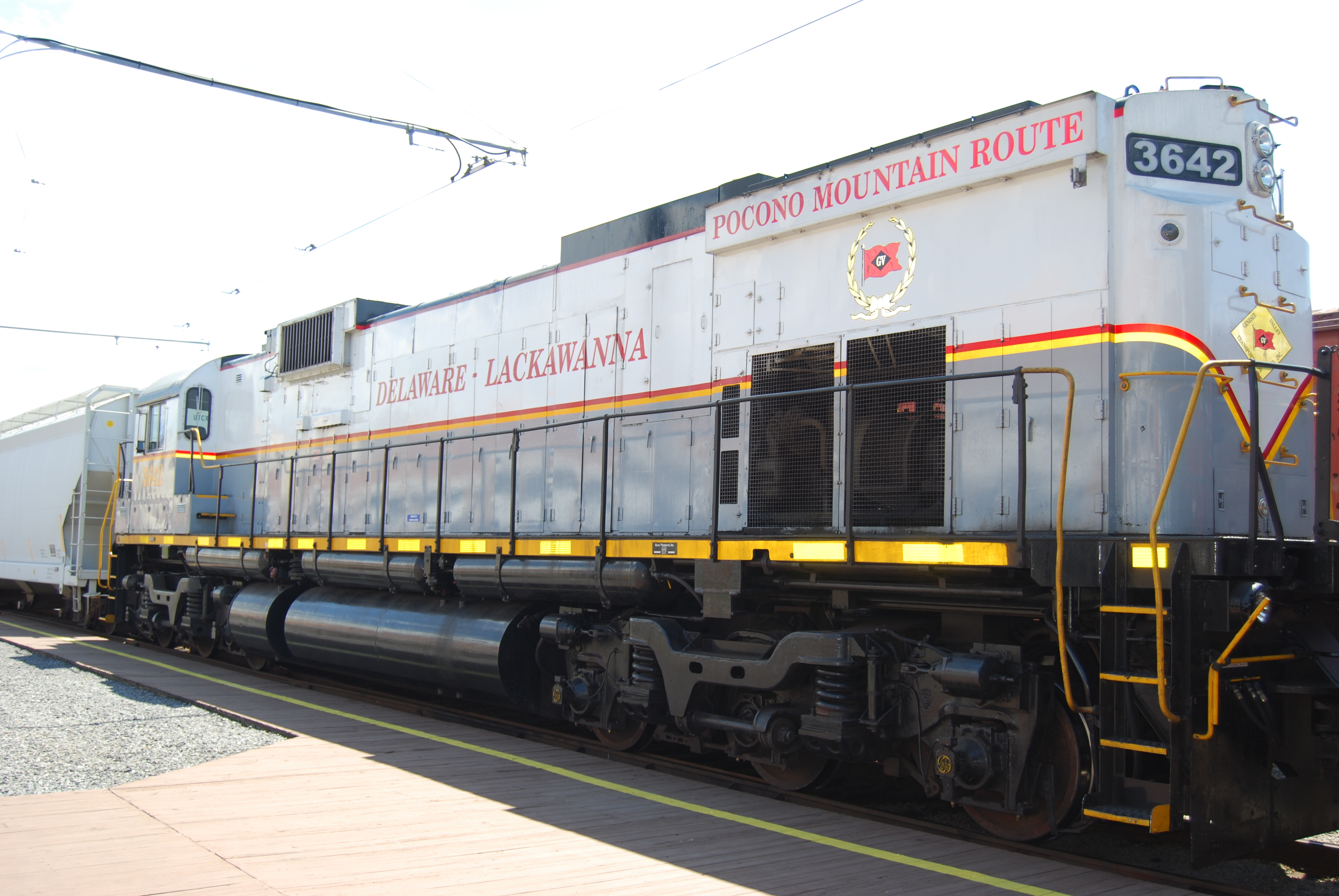
- Delaware-Lackawanna Railroad 3642, the sole remaining ALCO C636 still in service, in August 2008
Type and origin
- Power type: Diesel-electric
- Builder: ALCo, AE Goodwin (licensee)
- Model: Century 636
- Build date: December 1967 – September 1970
- Total produced: 63
Specifications
- Configuration
  - AAR: C-C
- Gauge: 4 ft 8 1/2 in (1,435 mm) standard gauge
- Prime mover: ALCO 16-251E
- Engine type: V16 diesel engine
- Cylinders: 16
Performance figures
- Power output: 3,600 hp (2.7 MW)
Career
- Disposition: Most scrapped, some rebuilt, 1 preserved

The ALCO Century 636 was the most powerful single-engine diesel-electric locomotive constructed by the American Locomotive Company (ALCo). It used their 251 prime mover. The locomotive had a C-C wheel arrangement and 3,600 horsepower (2,700 kW). The locomotive rode on a pair of trucks of all-new design, known as the Hi-Ad, standing for 'high adhesion'. Visually, it is similar to the Century 630, but can be distinguished by the intercooler box. The C630 has two grilles on the intercooler box, one above the other, whereas the C636 only has the upper grille.

== Production ==
Between 1967 and 1968, 34 C636 locomotives were built by Alco in Schenectady, New York. Despite many new and innovative features, the C636 could not hold its own in the marketplace. Three demonstrator locomotives were built costing Alco about $5.5 million. Problems with Alco demonstrator number 636-2, the only demonstrator locomotive operating, were a factor in dissuading potential customers. During an evaluation on the Santa Fe Railway, the same traction motor blower on 636-2 failed and was replaced on three of four runs. Unit 636-2 also had unsatisfactory results while being tested on the Southern Pacific Railroad.

Montreal Locomotive Works produced the MLW M-636 variant of the C636 for Canadian Pacific Railway and Canadian National Railway.

In Australia, AE Goodwin built 29 C636s between May 1968 and September 1970 for Pilbara iron ore railroads. Hamersley Iron purchased 12 units in 5 separate orders. Bechtel purchased 5 C636s for use in the construction of the Mount Newman Mining facilities. The latter company ordered 12 C636s a year later and bought Bechtel's locomotives. Hamersley Iron had their fleet rebuilt in the 1980s by Comeng, Bassendean with the Australian designed Pilbara cab.

== Original owners ==
Image	Railroad	Quantity	Road numbers	Notes
	Alco Products (demonstrators)	3	636-1–636-3	To Québec Cartier Mining Company 77-79
	Illinois Central Railroad	6	1100–1105	to Illinois Central Gulf in 1972, same numbers
	Penn Central	15	6330–6344	Ordered by PRR before PC merger; to Conrail as 6780-6794
	Spokane, Portland and Seattle Railway	10	330–335, 340–343	To Burlington Northern 4360-4369
	Hamersley Iron	12	3006–3017	Built by AE Goodwin, Australia
	Mount Newman Mining	17	5452–5468	Built by AE Goodwin, Australia
	Total	63		

== Current usage ==
As of March 2020, the only unrebuilt ALCO-built C636 in existence is in operation on the Delaware-Lackawanna Railroad of Scranton, Pennsylvania. It now operates as DL #3642, alongside some MLW-built M-630s and M-636s.

The DL's MLW-built units were previously operated by the Western New York and Pennsylvania Railroad, but the WNYP removed them from service in Summer 2019 and replaced by GE AC6000CWs that formerly served with CSX Transportation. The WNYP M-630s and M-636s were eventually sold to the Delaware-Lackawanna.

== See also ==
- List of ALCO diesel locomotives
- List of MLW diesel locomotives
