= South Australian Railways 930 class =

Class of Australian diesel-electric locomotives

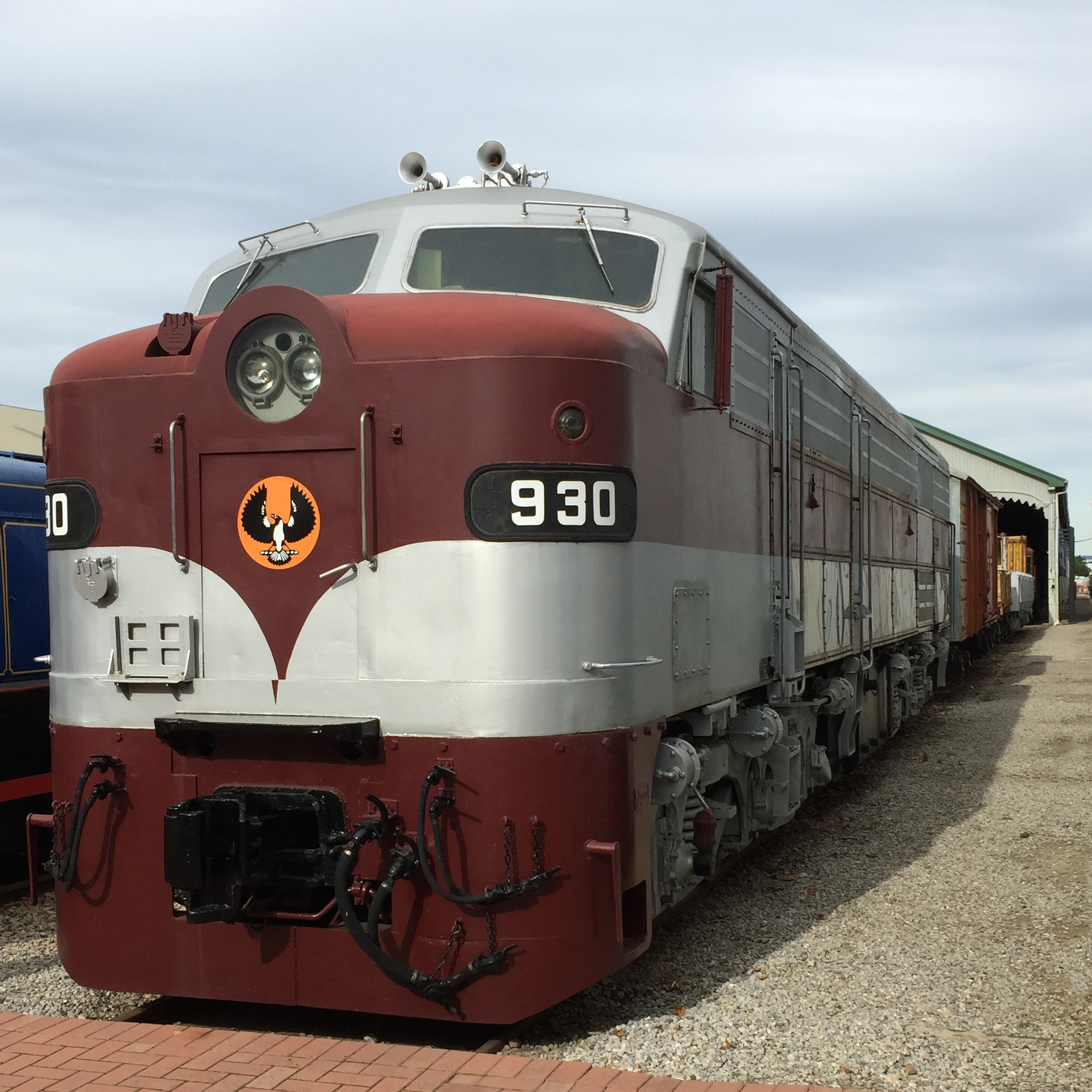
- Preserved SAR class leader number 930 at the National Railway Museum in 2022
Type and origin
- Power type: Diesel-electric
- Builder: AE Goodwin, Auburn
- Serial number: Alco 81885-81890; Alco 82798-82806; Alco 82913-82917; Alco 83829-83835; Alco 84120; Alco G-3388-1 to G-3388-5; Alco G-3471-1 to G-3471-4
- Model: Alco DL-500B
- Build date: 1955–1967
- Total produced: 37
Specifications
- Configuration
  - UIC: Co-Co
- Gauge: 1,600 mm (5 ft 3 in); 1,435 mm (4 ft 8 1/2 in) from 1982
- Length: 17.94 m (58 ft 10 in)
- Fuel type: Diesel
- Fuel capacity: 6,065 L (1,334 imp gal; 1,602 US gal)
- Prime mover: Alco 251B
- Engine type: Four-stroke V12 diesel
- Aspiration: Turbocharged
- Cylinders: 12
Performance figures
- Maximum speed: 113 km/h (70 mph)
- Tractive effort: For traction: 1,600 hp (1,190 kW)
Career
- Operators: South Australian Railways
- Number in class: 37
- Numbers: 930–966 (from 1986, 930 became 967)
- First run: December 1955
- Preserved: 930, 958, 961, 963
- Disposition: 3 preserved, 1 under restoration, 33 scrapped

The South Australian Railways 930 class was a class of diesel-electric locomotives built for the South Australian Railways between 1955 and 1967 by AE Goodwin, Auburn, New South Wales, the Australian licensee of the American Locomotive Company (Alco). Based on the Alco DL500B World series model, they were fitted with Alco 12-251B four-stroke V12 turbocharged diesel engines that developed 1600 horsepower (1190 kilowatts) for traction. The first six of the class had a driving cab at one end only; the remaining 31 locomotives had two. The latter series, up-rated, were the basis of the almost identical New South Wales 44 class, of which 100 were built from 1957.

== History ==
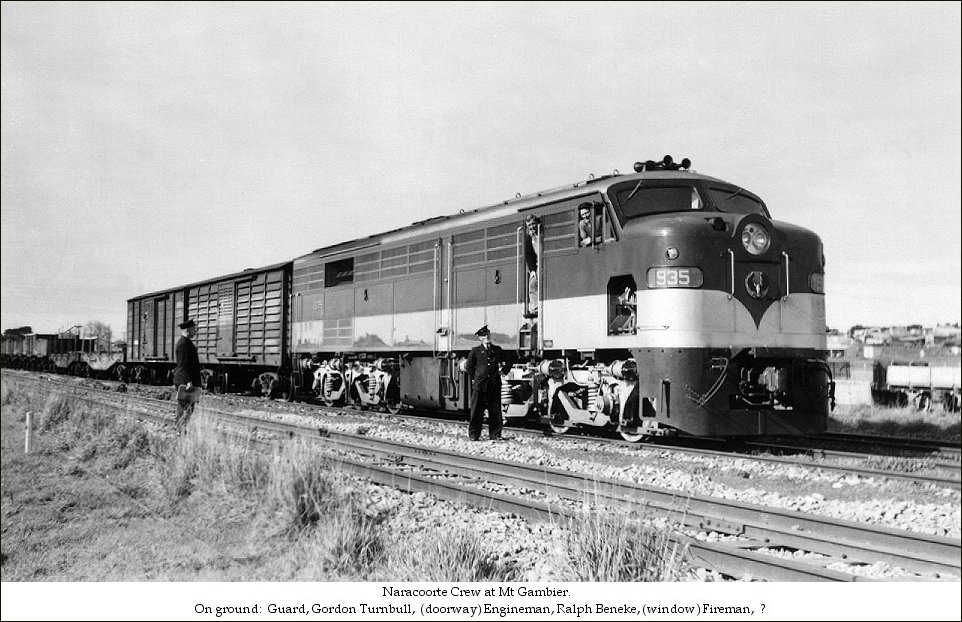
935 at Mount Gambier circa 1960

The first six (single-ended) locomotives were delivered in 1955 and 1956 to operate over the steeply graded Adelaide to Tailem Bend line and onwards to Serviceton. A further 31 (double-ended) entered service between July 1957 and June 1967 and operated across the broad-gauge network. The double-ended locomotives had a "bulldog" nose at the "A" end (not as round as the Clyde–GM "Bulldog nose" type) and were flat at the "B" end . All were delivered with broad-gauge bogies and worked across the South Australian Railways network. In hot weather, crews frequently marshalled the locomotives with the "B" end leading so that the front door could be opened to provide more air circulation.

In March 1978, all were included in the transfer of the South Australian Railways to Australian National. From 1982, some were converted to standard gauge using bogies from State Rail Authority 44 class locomotives hauling trains from Adelaide to Whyalla and Broken Hill. On the broad gauge, some began operating through to Melbourne in the mid-1980s.

In 1986, a new computer system required the class leaders of the former South Australian Railways to be renumbered as the last member of the class, with 930 becoming 967.

Withdrawals commenced in 1986; only two remained by January 1994. Only 961 was included in the sale of Australian National's freight operations to Australian Southern Railroad in November 1997. In May 2001 it was sold to Silverton Rail as 44s1. In March 2005 it passed to Chicago Freight Car Leasing Australia, retaining its 44s1 number. Withdrawn sometime during the early 2010s, it is currently under the care of the "961 Restoration Group", a consortium of RailFirst Asset Management (the successor to CFCLA) employees planning to restore the locomotive, however no progress has been made as of yet.

== Disposition ==
As of 2022, the disposition of the four remaining members of the class was as follows:

No.	Owner	Location	Notes
930	National Railway Museum	Port Adelaide, SA	Static display. SAR maroon and silver livery.
958	SteamRanger Heritage Railway	Mount Barker, SA	In operational condition. AN green and yellow livery without logos.
961	Private owner	Goulburn roundhouse, NSW	Under restoration. AN Explorer blue and yellow livery.
963	SteamRanger Heritage Railway	Mount Barker, SA	Non-operational. AN green and yellow livery.

== Bibliography ==
- A guide to Australian Locomotion. Australian Railway Historical Society. 2009. ISBN 978-0-9805106-3-8.
