= Anthracite Railroads Historical Society =

Railroad preservation group

Anthracite Railroads Historical Society, Inc. (ARHS) is a non-profit organization founded in 1974 to preserve historic anthracite hauling railroads of eastern Pennsylvania. The railroads that ARHS is responsible for preserving include:

- Central Railroad of New Jersey (1843–1976)
- Delaware, Lackawanna and Western Railroad (1851-1960)
- Lehigh and Hudson River Railway (1882-1976)
- Lehigh and New England Railroad (1895–1961)
- Lehigh Valley Railroad (1851–1976)
- Reading Company (1833–1976)

== Collections ==
The ARHS owns various pieces of rolling stock either depicting an Anthracite Road or a genuine piece of Anthracite Road history.

== Publications ==
ARHS publishes The Anthracite Extra newsletter and Flags, Diamonds and Statues magazine.
