= A. E. Goodwin =

Australian heavy engineering company

A.E. Goodwin
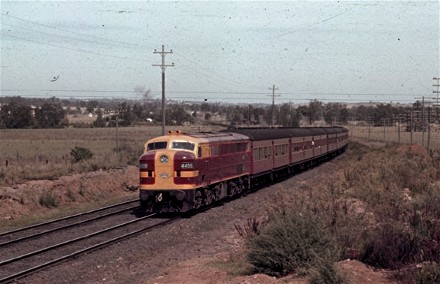
- Goodwin-built New South Wales 44 class locomotive at Minto in 1961
- Industry: Locomotive and rolling stock manufacturing
- Defunct: November 1972
- Headquarters: Auburn

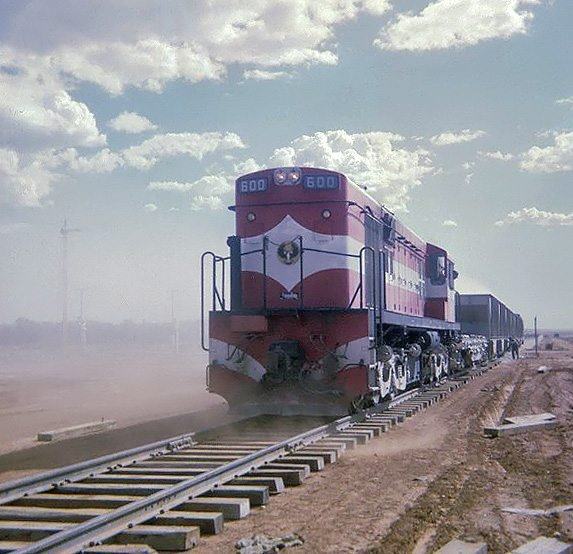
South Australian Railways 600 class in its inaugural livery and role, preparing the conversion of track gauge between Peterborough and Broken Hill in April 1969. It was based on the Alco DL-541.

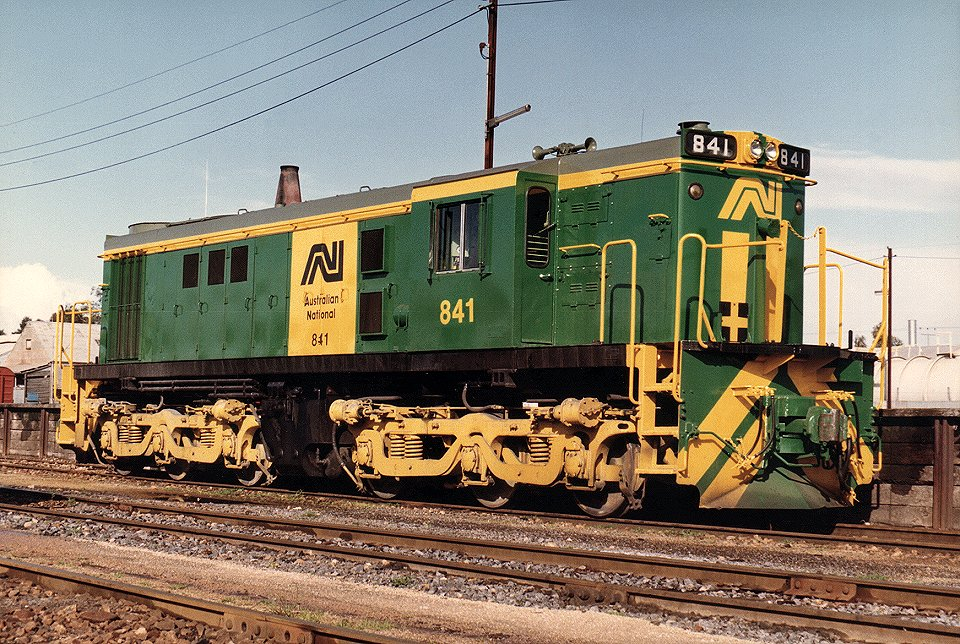
South Australian Railways 830 class no. 841 in its subsequent livery under Australian National ownership, 1983

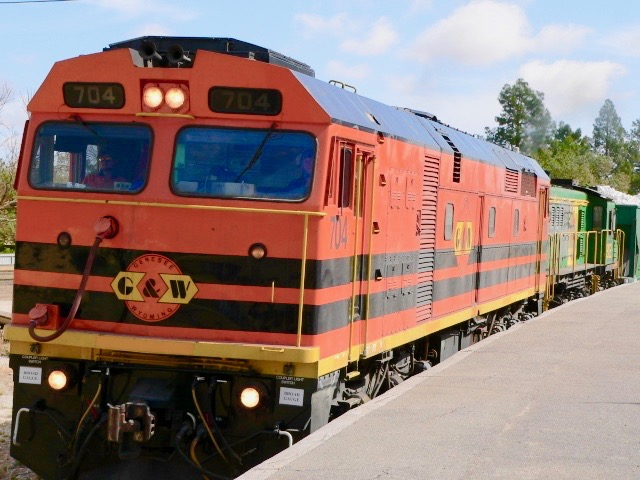
700 class at Tanunda in March 2007

A.E. Goodwin was an Australian heavy engineering firm, which produced railway locomotives and rolling stock, as well as roadmaking machinery at its factory in Auburn.

== History ==
Founded in December 1935 by Arthur Elliott Goodwin, the company was originally based in Lidcombe. In 1946 it relocated to St Marys and in the late 1960s to Auburn. In the mid-1950s it became the Australian licence holder for American Locomotive Company (Alco) products, building over 400 diesel locomotives between December 1955 and November 1972. In 1961 the company was taken over by household appliance manufacturer AG Healing.

A.E. Goodwin collapsed in November 1972. It was purchased from its administrator by Comeng, who completed the outstanding locomotives on order, six 442 class for the Public Transport Commission, one M636 for Hammersley Iron and four M636s for Mount Newman Mining at the Auburn factory before closing it.

== Production ==
Diesel locomotives manufactured included:

=== New South Wales Government Railways ===
- 100 44 class
- 40 45 class
- 165 48 class
- 34 442 class

=== South Australian Railways ===
- 37 930 class
- 45 830 class
- 7 600 class
- 6 700 class

=== Silverton Tramway ===
- 3 ST class

=== Hamersley Iron ===
- 12 Alco 636
- 19 MLW M636

=== Mount Newman Mining ===
- 17 ALCO Century 636
- MLW M636C++

++ 27 built in total by A.E. Goodwin and Comeng, split unknown

=== Robe River Mining ===
- 7 MLW M636

== See also ==
- List of locomotive builders
