= New South Wales 45 class locomotive =

Class of diesel-electric locomotive

New South Wales 45 class
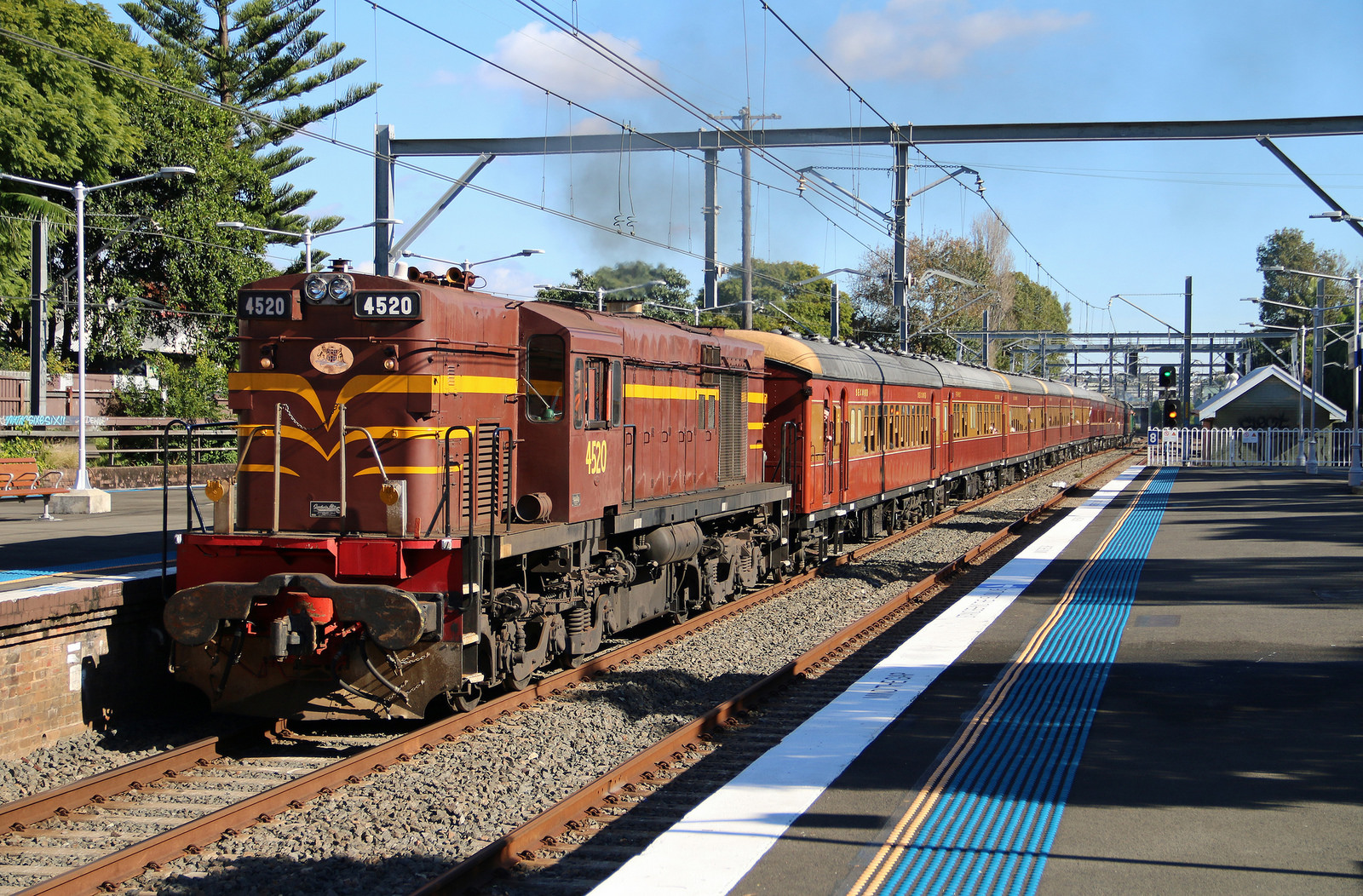
- 4520 at St Peters in 2017
Type and origin
- Power type: Diesel-electric
- Builder: AE Goodwin, Auburn
- Serial number: Alco 84143–84182
- Model: RSD-20 or DL-541
- Build date: 1962-1964
- Total produced: 40
Specifications
- Configuration
  - UIC: Co-Co
- Gauge: 4 ft 8 1/2 in (1,435 mm) standard gauge
- Wheel diameter: 40 in (1,016 mm)
- Length: Over headstocks: 54 ft 6 in (16.61 m), Over coupler pulling faces: 58 ft 8 in (17.88 m)
- Width: 9 ft 8 1/2 in (2.96 m)
- Height: 13 ft 11 in (4.24 m)
- Axle load: 18 long tons 8 cwt (41,200 lb or 18.7 t)
- Loco weight: 110 long tons 10 cwt (247,500 lb or 112.3 t)
- Fuel type: Diesel
- Fuel capacity: 1,200 imp gal (5,500 L; 1,400 US gal)
- Lubricant cap.: 165 imp gal (750 L; 198 US gal)
- Coolant cap.: 210 imp gal (950 L; 250 US gal)
- Sandbox cap.: 14 cu ft (0.40 m^{3})
- Prime mover: Alco 12-251C
- RPM range: 400-1000
- Engine type: Four-stroke, V12 diesel
- Aspiration: Turbocharger
- Generator: Associated Electrical Industries 5301
- Traction motors: Associated Electrical Industries 165 or General Electric 752
- Cylinders: 12
- Cylinder size: 9 in × 10.5 in (229 mm × 267 mm)
Performance figures
- Maximum speed: 75 mph (120 km/h)
- Power output: Gross: 1,950 hp (1,450 kW), For traction: 1,800 hp (1,340 kW)
- Tractive effort: Continuous: 68,000 lbf (302.48 kN) at 7.4 mph (11.9 km/h)
Career
- Operators: NSW Department of Railways
- Number in class: 40
- Numbers: 4501–4540
- Delivered: 1962
- First run: 5 June 1962
- Last run: 1964
- Preserved: 4501, 4502, 4520, 4521, 4528, 4537
- Current owner: Greentrains Pacific National Southern Shorthaul Railroad
- Disposition: 31 Scrapped, 2 Stored, 7 Preserved, 3 Operational, 1 Unknown

The 45 class are a class of diesel-electric locomotives built by AE Goodwin, Auburn for the New South Wales Department of Railways between 1962 and 1964.

== History ==
The 45 class were built by Alco's Australian licensee AE Goodwin, and are based on the Alco DL-541 model. They initially entered service on the Main Southern line but later operated on all main lines. One was destroyed in a collision in May 1972.

From June 1984, the Australian Federated Union of Locomotive Enginemen placed a ban on the class as leading locomotives, meaning they could only be used as second locomotives, although they were able to be used on Sydney metropolitan trip and Liverpool Range banking duties.

Six were fitted with upgraded cabs and modified bogies at Cardiff Workshops in 1989 and reclassified as class 451s and later class 35s, allowing them again to be used as lead locomotives, although they spent most of their time being used as Liverpool Range bankers and Yeerongpilly, Brisbane shunters. Following a poor wheat crop, the Class 45s were placed in store at Junee Locomotive Depot in December 1991. A locomotive shortage saw most return to service from March 1993. They remained in service until replaced by FreightCorp by Class 82s in 1994/95.

Thirty-two were auctioned in December 1994 with most being sold for scrap. One was retained by the State Rail Authority as a designated heritage locomotive while four were transferred to Rail Services Australia before being sold to Great Northern Rail Services in 2000. One remains in service with Greentrains.

== Survivors ==
- 4501 sold to Great Northern Rail Services 2000 (unused), then to Silverton Rail (unused), then to Chicago Freight Car Leasing Australia (unused), then to Goodwin Alco Pty Ltd who restored it to main line condition at Eveleigh Railway Workshops in 2007, leasing it to 3801 Limited. Now based at Thirlmere and leased to Transport Heritage NSW for heritage work.
- 4502 sold to Great Northern Rail Services 2000 (unused), then to Silverton Rail (unused), then to Chicago Freight Car Leasing Australia (unused), then Lachlan Valley Railway in 2012, stored at Broken Hill
- 3505 sold to Junee Railway Workshop. Was meant to be rebuilt with a Pilbara cab, but the project fell through and it eventually was forgotten about. Its engine cladding has since been removed and it is being used as a mobile loco service stand, while the Pilbara cab was painted blue and yellow and is used as a picnic stand.
- 4520 is part of the Transport Heritage NSW collection operating in the custody of the NSW Rail Museum
- 4521 is preserved by the Dorrigo Steam Railway & Museum
- 4528 sold to Great Northern Rail Services 2000 (unused), then to Silverton Rail (unused), then to Chicago Freight Car Leasing Australia (unused), then Lachlan Valley Railway in 2012, stored at Broken Hill, Silverton Rail had started a rebuilt it as 45s2, but the project was not completed
- 3532 sold to Great Northern Rail Services 2000 (unused), then to Silverton Rail entering service in June 2002 as 45s1, sold to Greentrains, remained in service in December 2013. Sold to Southern Shorthaul Railroad April 2016 Renumbered 4532 as of August 2019
- 4537 sold to Junee Railway Workshops rebuilt with a lowered and shortened No.1 end, leased in June 1995 to BHP for use on their Port Kembla network as 103, later sold to Patrick Portlink. It is now part of The Picnic Train fleet. In mid-2026, it was renumbered back to its original 4537 designation. Officially returned to traffic in August 2026.

== Fleet Status ==
Number	Owner	Status	Notes
4501	Transport Heritage NSW	Operational	
4502	Lachlan Valley Railway	Stored	
4503	-	Scrapped	Named Geoff Walker
4504	-	Scrapped	
3505 (ex. 4505)	Unknown	Stored	
4506	-	Scrapped	
3507 (ex. 4507)	-	Scrapped	
4508	-	Scrapped	
4509	-	Scrapped	
4510	-	Scrapped	
4511	-	Scrapped	
4512	-	Scrapped	
3513 (ex. 4513)	-	Scrapped	
4514	-	Scrapped	
4515	-	Scrapped	
4516	-	Scrapped	
4517	-	Scrapped	
3518 (ex. 4518)	-	Scrapped	
4519	-	Scrapped	
4520	Transport Heritage NSW	Under repair	
4521	Dorrigo Steam Railway and Museum	Stored	
4522	-	Scrapped	
4523	-	Scrapped	
4524	-	Scrapped	
4525	-	Scrapped	
4526	-	Scrapped	
3527 (ex. 4527)	-	Scrapped	
4528	Lachlan Valley Railway	Stored	
4529	-	Scrapped	
4530	-	Scrapped	
4531	Unknown	Unknown	
4532	Southern Shorthaul Railroad	Operational	
4533	-	Scrapped	
4534	-	Scrapped	
4535	-	Scrapped	
4536	-	Scrapped	
4537	The Picnic Train	Operational	nicknamed ‘Stumpy’ by the Picnic Train in a post on Instagram, https://www.instagram.com/p/DbuRfjPMzOP/
4538	-	Scrapped	
4539	-	Scrapped	
4540	-	Scrapped	
