= Delaware River Viaduct =

Railroad bridge in New Jersey, United States

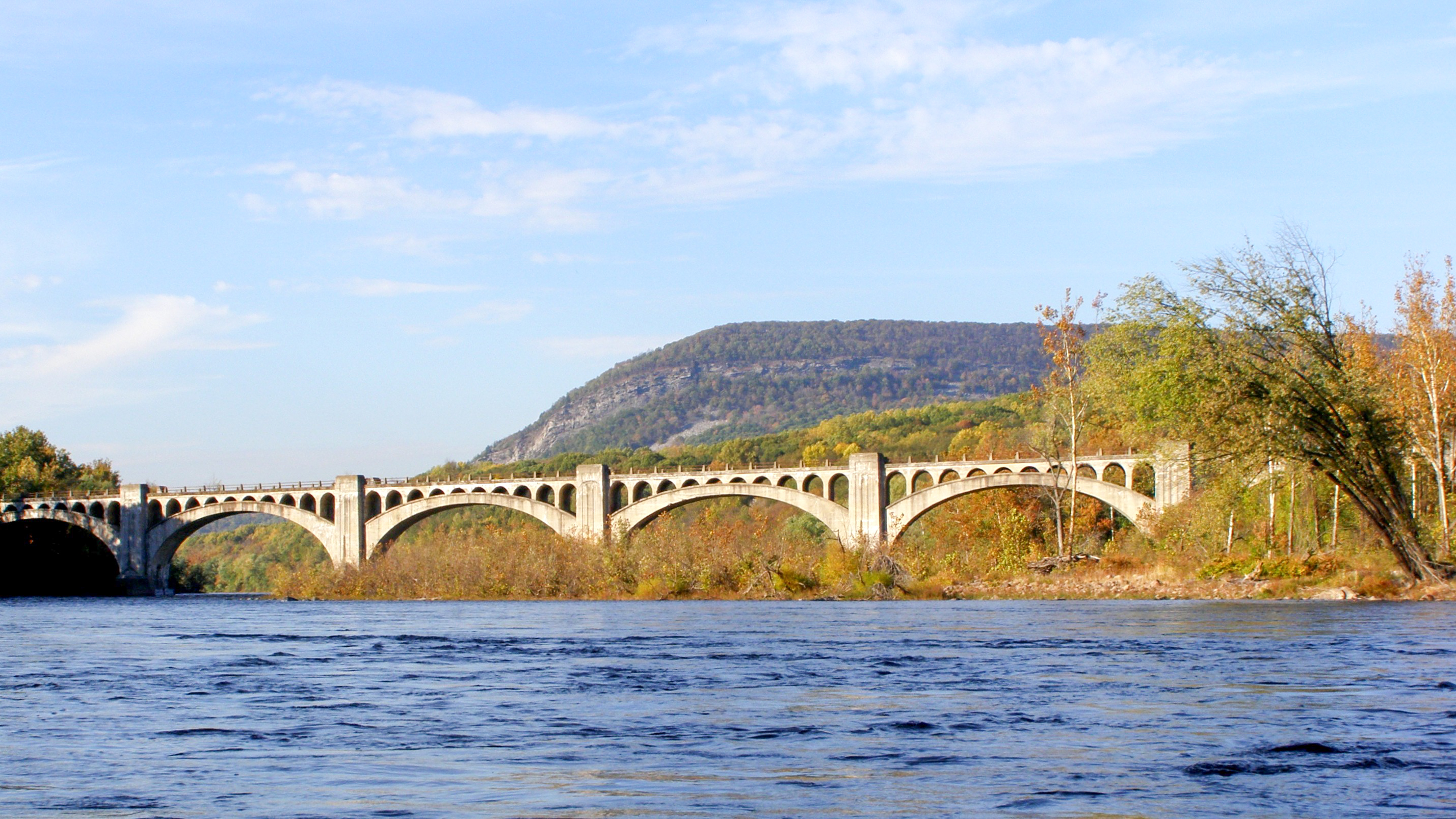
- Coordinates: 40°56′15″N 75°06′21″W
- Carries: Lackawanna Cut-Off
- Crosses: Delaware River, I-80
- Locale: Between Upper Mount Bethel Township, Pennsylvania and Knowlton Township, New Jersey

Characteristics
- Material: Reinforced concrete
- Total length: 1,452 feet (443 m)
- Width: 34 feet (10 m)
- Height: 65 feet (20 m)
- Longest span: 150 feet (46 m)
- No. of spans: 9
- Piers in water: 6

History
- Designer: Abraham Burton Cohen
- Construction start: August 1908
- Construction end: December 1, 1910
- Opened: December 24, 1911

Location
- Interactive map of Delaware River Viaduct

The Delaware River Viaduct is a reinforced concrete railroad bridge across the Delaware River about two miles (3.2 km) south of the Delaware Water Gap in Pennsylvania and New Jersey, United States. It was built from 1908 to 1910 as part of the Lackawanna Cut-Off rail line. It is the sister to the line's Paulinskill Viaduct about 3 miles to the east. The Delaware River Viaduct also crosses Interstate 80 on the east (New Jersey) side of the river and Slateford Road and the Lackawanna Railroad's "Old Road" (now Delaware-Lackawanna) on the west (Pennsylvania) side. Abandoned in 1983, it is part of an Amtrak proposal to introduce passenger service between Scranton, Pennsylvania and New York City, a distance of 135 mi (217 km).

The bridge is 1,452 feet (443 m) long and 65 ft (20 m) high from water level to the top of the rail. It is composed of five 150 ft (46 m) spans and two 120 ft (37 m) spans. It was considered the largest reinforced concrete structure in the world when it was completed in 1910.

== Design and construction ==
Original plans called for the bridge to have a 1°30″ curve, which would have allowed speeds of 80 mph (130 km/h). However, the design was altered and the curve on the bridge was eliminated in favor of making it tangent (straight) with curved approaches—a 1°30″ curve on the New Jersey side and a 3°30″ curve on the Pennsylvania side. The latter curve—the sharpest on the Cut-Off, which otherwise did not have any curves sharper than 2°—required trains to slow to 50 mph (80 km/h).

Construction of the bridge was described in a 1909 article by Abraham Burton Cohen, then a draftsman for the Delaware, Lackawanna and Western Railroad, who went on to design the Tunkhannock Viaduct, an even larger structure on the railroad's Clarks Summit–Hallstead Cut-Off.

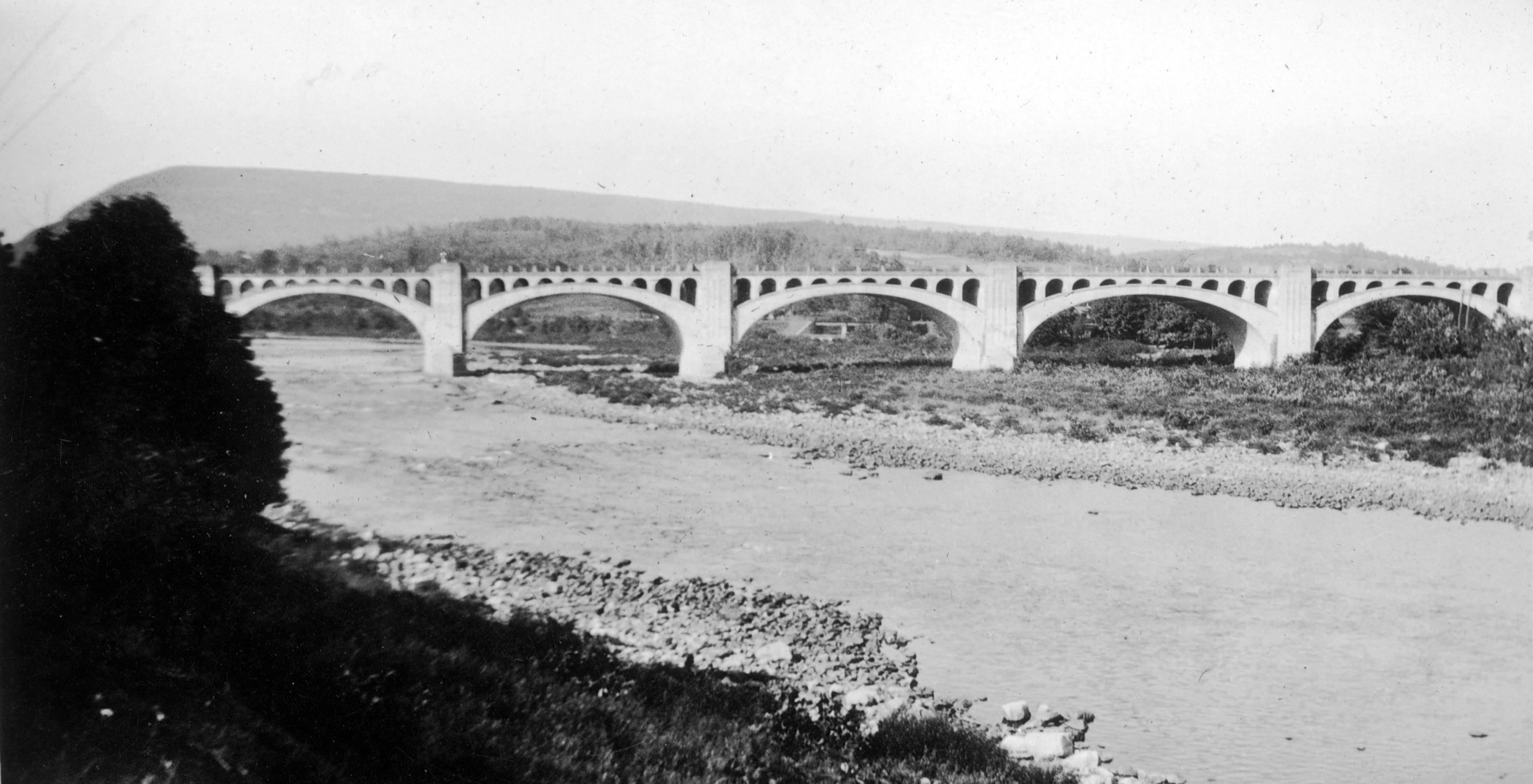
The viaduct, with Mount Tammany appearing in the distance, taken from the Pennsylvania side of the river, July 1923.

The footings were excavated down to bedrock, which ranges from 26 ft (7.9 m) to 53 ft (16 m) below the surface. A total of 51,376 cubic feet (1,454.8 m^{3}) of concrete and 627 tons of reinforcing steel were used to construct this bridge.

At its completion, the viaduct was thought to be the largest reinforced concrete structure built with a continuous pour process.

There is no known evidence to support the legend that several workers fell into the concrete during construction and could not be extracted because of the need to keep pouring. This legend has been attached to other large concrete structures, including Hoover Dam.

The bridge was completed on December 1, 1910, about a year before the Cut-Off opened, which allowed construction trains to haul building materials to work sites east of the bridge.

== Disuse and proposals for possible future use ==
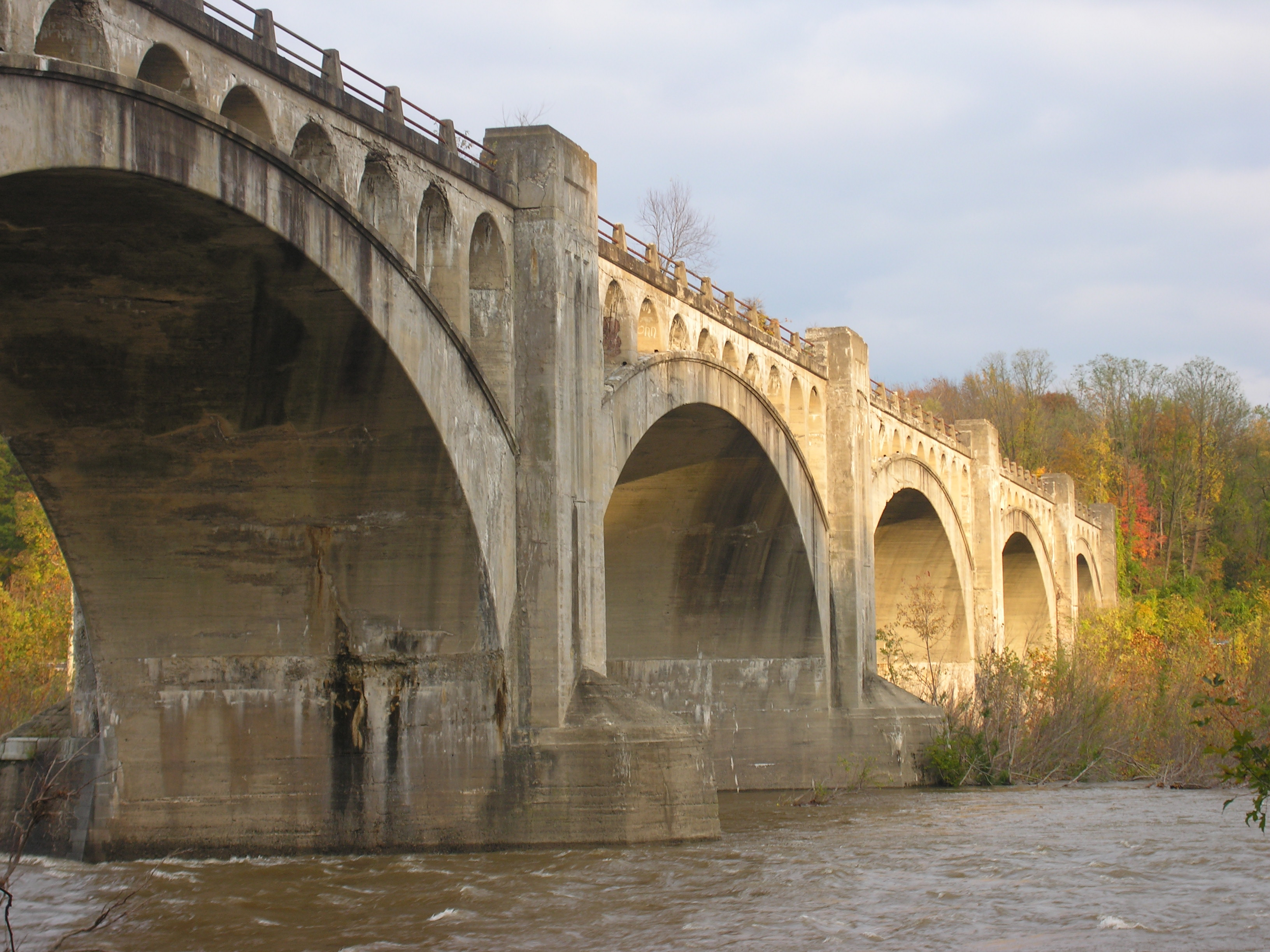
The Delaware River Viaduct in 2006, as seen from the Pennsylvania side of the river.

The tracks on the viaduct were removed by Conrail in March 1989, five years after removal took place on the New Jersey section of the Cut-Off.

In September 2020, Amtrak proposed the restoration of rail service between Scranton and New York City at some point before 2035. The restoration of service along the Lackawanna Railroad's previous route would require repairs to the bridge as well as the restoration of the Lackawanna Cut-Off. In 2011, New Jersey Transit began reconstructing a 7.3-mile (11.7 km) stretch of the 28-mile (45 km) Lackawanna Cutoff in order to restore rail service to Andover, New Jersey.

== See also ==
- List of bridges documented by the Historic American Engineering Record in Pennsylvania
- List of crossings of the Delaware River
