= Harrison Avenue Bridge =

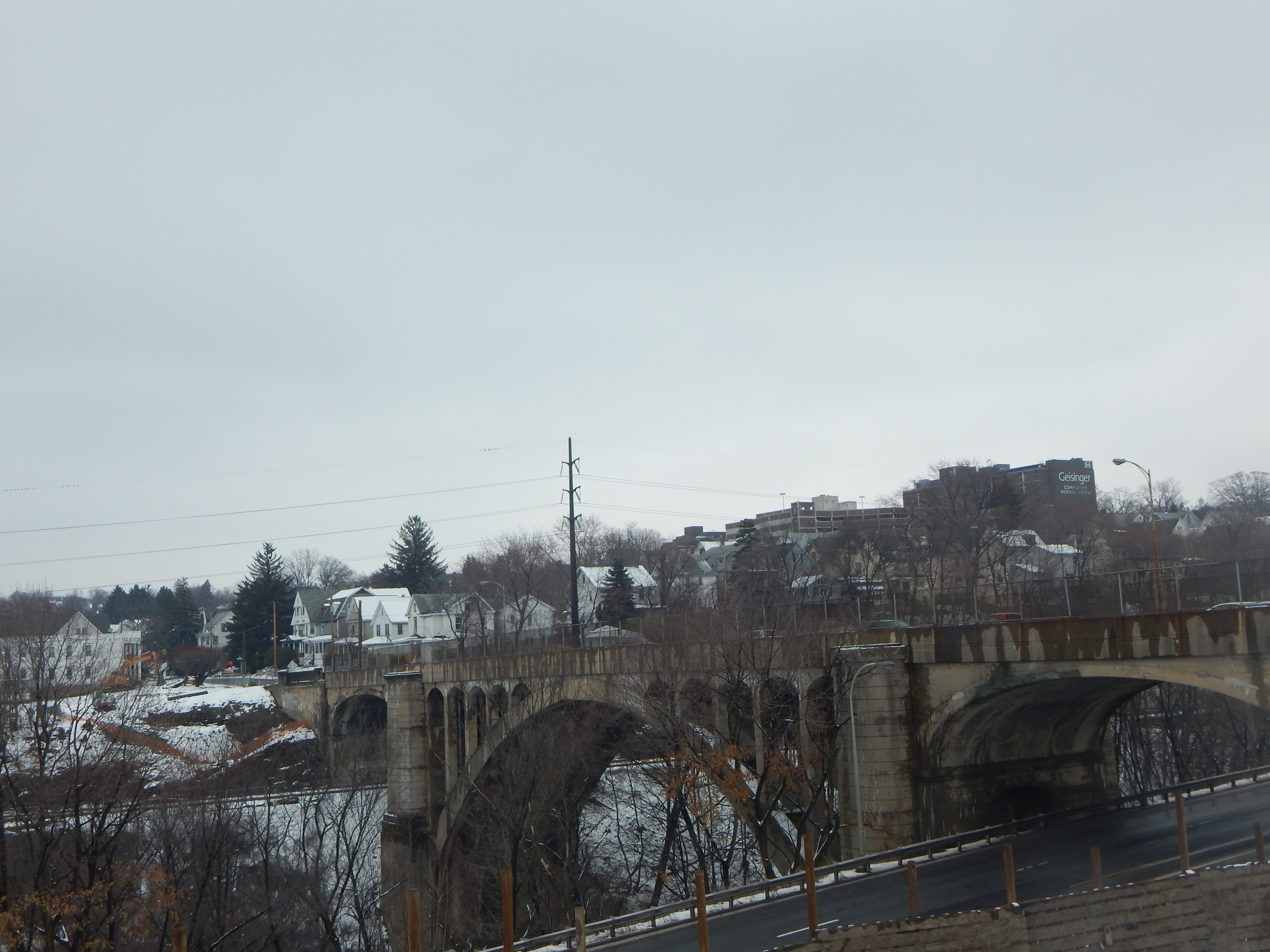
- The Harrison Avenue Bridge in March 2015, with the Central Scranton Expressway under the right-most arch.
- Coordinates: 41°24′N 75°42′W
- Carries: Harrison Avenue (State Route 6011)
- Crosses: Roaring Brook and Central Scranton Expressway
- Locale: Scranton, Pennsylvania
- Other name: South-East Scranton Viaduct
- Maintained by: PennDOT

Characteristics
- Design: Open-spandrel deck arch
- Material: Concrete
- Total length: 407 feet (124 m)
- Width: 40 feet (12 m)
- Longest span: 202 feet (62 m)
- No. of spans: 3

History
- Designer: Abraham Burton Cohen
- Constructed by: Anthracite Bridge Company
- Harrison Avenue Bridge
- U.S. National Register of Historic Places
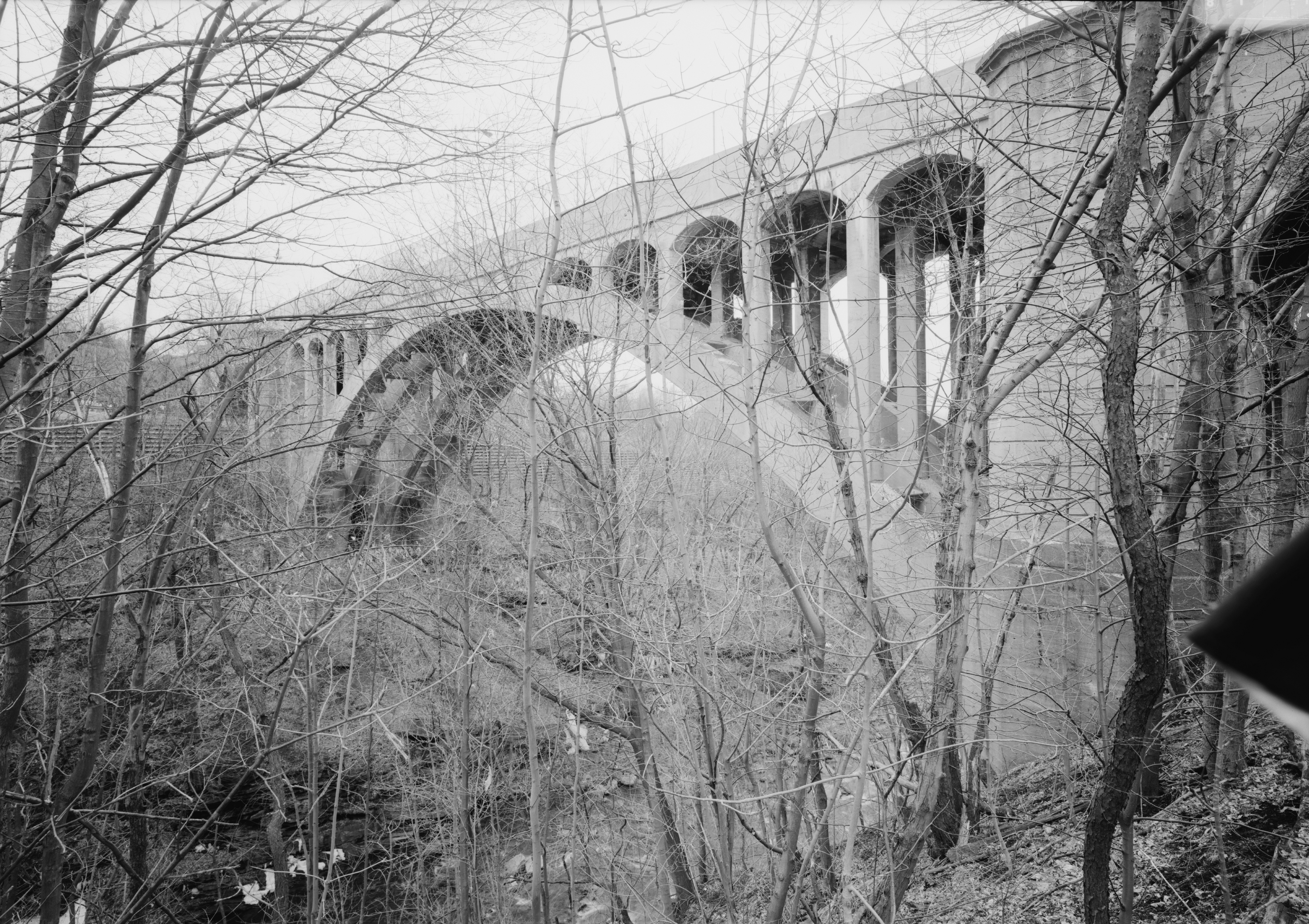
- The Harrison Avenue Bridge in 1999.

- Location within Pennsylvania
- Coordinates: 41°24′0″N 75°39′5″W
- Area: less than one acre
- Built: 1922
- MPS: Highway Bridges Owned by the Commonwealth of Pennsylvania, Department of Transportation TR
- NRHP reference No.: 88000767
- Added to NRHP: June 22, 1988

Location
- Interactive map of Harrison Avenue Bridge

The Harrison Avenue Bridge was a concrete deck arch bridge carrying Harrison Avenue (unsigned SR 6011) in Scranton, Pennsylvania, United States.

== History and architectural features ==
Its three spans included an open-spandrel ribbed arch over Roaring Brook, flanked by two closed-spandrel arches. The southwestern closed-spandrel arch spanned the former Lackawanna and Wyoming Valley Railroad (Laurel Line), converted to highway use in 1964 as the Central Scranton Expressway. The northeastern closed-spandrel arch spans the former Delaware, Lackawanna and Western Railroad, now a heritage railroad operated by Steamtown National Historic Site.

Built between 1921 and 1922, the bridge was notable as an example of Progressive Era civic involvement, its construction having been promoted by a citizens' group called the South to East Scranton Bridge Association. It was designed by New York City-based consulting engineer Abraham Burton Cohen, although Scranton Department of Public Works chief engineer William A. Schunk and his assistant Charles F. Schroeder were more actively involved in day-to-day supervision of construction.

The bridge was listed on the National Register of Historic Places in 1988.

Construction of a replacement bridge on a parallel alignment began in October 2014 and was completed in December 2017. The old bridge was demolished in June 2018.

== See also ==
- List of bridges documented by the Historic American Engineering Record in Pennsylvania
- List of bridges on the National Register of Historic Places in Pennsylvania
- National Register of Historic Places listings in Lackawanna County, Pennsylvania
