= Abraham Burton Cohen =

American civil engineer

- Born: March 9, 1882; Chicago
- Died: February 11, 1956 (aged 73)
- Alma mater: Purdue University
- Occupation: Civil engineer
- Employer: Delaware, Lackawanna and Western Railroad
- Works: Tunkhannock Viaduct

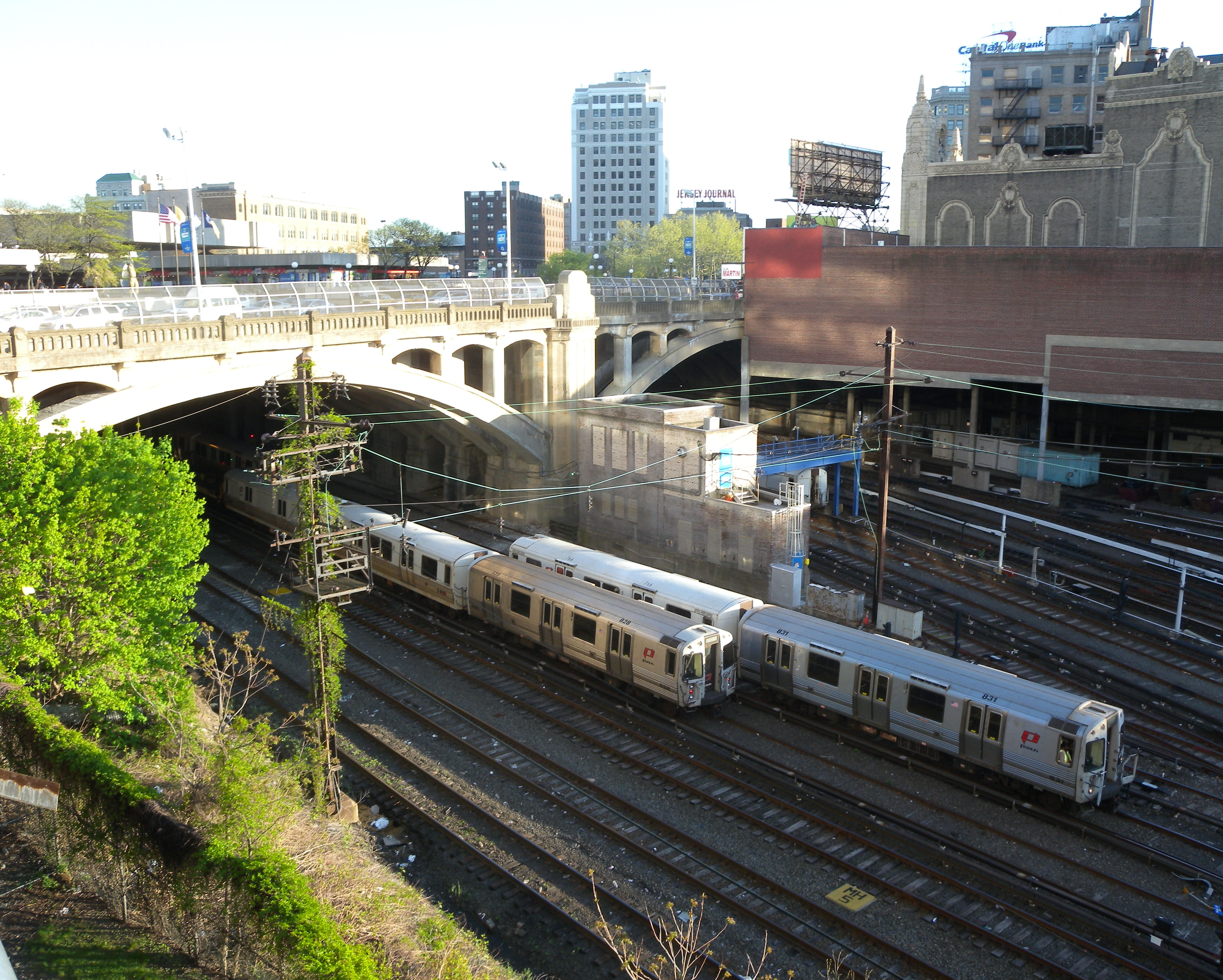
Hudson County Boulevard Bridge at Journal Square

Abraham Burton Cohen (March 9, 1882 – February 11, 1956) was an American civil engineer notable for his role in designing innovative and record-breaking concrete bridges such as the Delaware, Lackawanna and Western Railroad's Tunkhannock Viaduct, the world's largest concrete structure when completed. Cohen was an active member of the American Concrete Institute and earned ACI's Wason Medal for Most Meritorious Paper in 1927.

== Biography ==
Cohen was Jewish, born in Chicago and died in East Orange, New Jersey. He earned a degree in civil engineering from Purdue University in 1905 and an honorary doctorate in 1949. Cohen spent a majority of his career with the Delaware, Lackawanna and Western Railroad (DL&W) before leaving in 1920 to form his own consulting practice in New York City. As a consulting engineer, he designed a number of concrete spans in Scranton, Pennsylvania, Binghamton, New York, and elsewhere. At least two of his works, the Tunkhannock Viaduct and Scranton's Harrison Avenue Bridge, are on the National Register of Historic Places. He died on February 11, 1956.

== Selected projects ==
- 1908 Delaware River Viaduct on DL&W Lackawanna Cut-Off
- 1909 Paulinskill Viaduct on DL&W Lackawanna Cut-Off
- 1913 Tunkhannock Viaduct on DL&W Clarks Summit-Hallstead Cutoff
- 1916 DL&W track elevation in Orange and South Orange, New Jersey
- 1921 Harrison Avenue Bridge in Scranton, Pennsylvania
- 1924 Hudson County Boulevard Bridge at Journal Square, Jersey City, New Jersey
- 1946 Spruce Street Bridge repairs in Scranton, Pennsylvania

== Bibliography ==
- Cohen, A. B. (April 1914). "Progress and Development of Concrete Work on the Delaware, Lackawanna & Western Railroad". ACI Journal Proceedings. 10 (4): 239–264. doi:10.14359/16088.
- Cohen, A. B. (June 1918). "Reinforced-Concrete Flat-Slab Railway Bridges". ACI Journal Proceedings. 14 (6): 321–334. doi:10.14359/15805.
- Cohen, A. Burton (February 1926). "Correlated Considerations in Design and Construction of Concrete Bridges". ACI Journal Proceedings. 22 (2): 560–610. doi:10.14359/15460.
- Cohen, A. Burton (September 1935). "Supervision and Inspection of Concrete". ACI Journal Proceedings. 32 (9): 40–45. doi:10.14359/8367.
- Cohen, A. Burton (November 1946). "Repairs to Spruce Street Bridge, Scranton, Pennsylvania". ACI Journal Proceedings. 43 (11): 241–248. doi:10.14359/8751.
