= Harry Curtis =

Harry Curtis may refer to:

- Harry Curtis (baseball) (1883–1951), catcher in Major League Baseball
- Harry Curtis (football manager) (1890–1966), English football referee and manager
- Harry Curtis (footballer) (1892–1968), Australian rules footballer
- Harry F. Curtis (1871–1939), engineer and Pennsylvania state representative

== See also ==
- Henry Curtis (disambiguation)
