= Electric City Trolley Museum =

Coordinates: 41°24′34″N 75°40′23″W

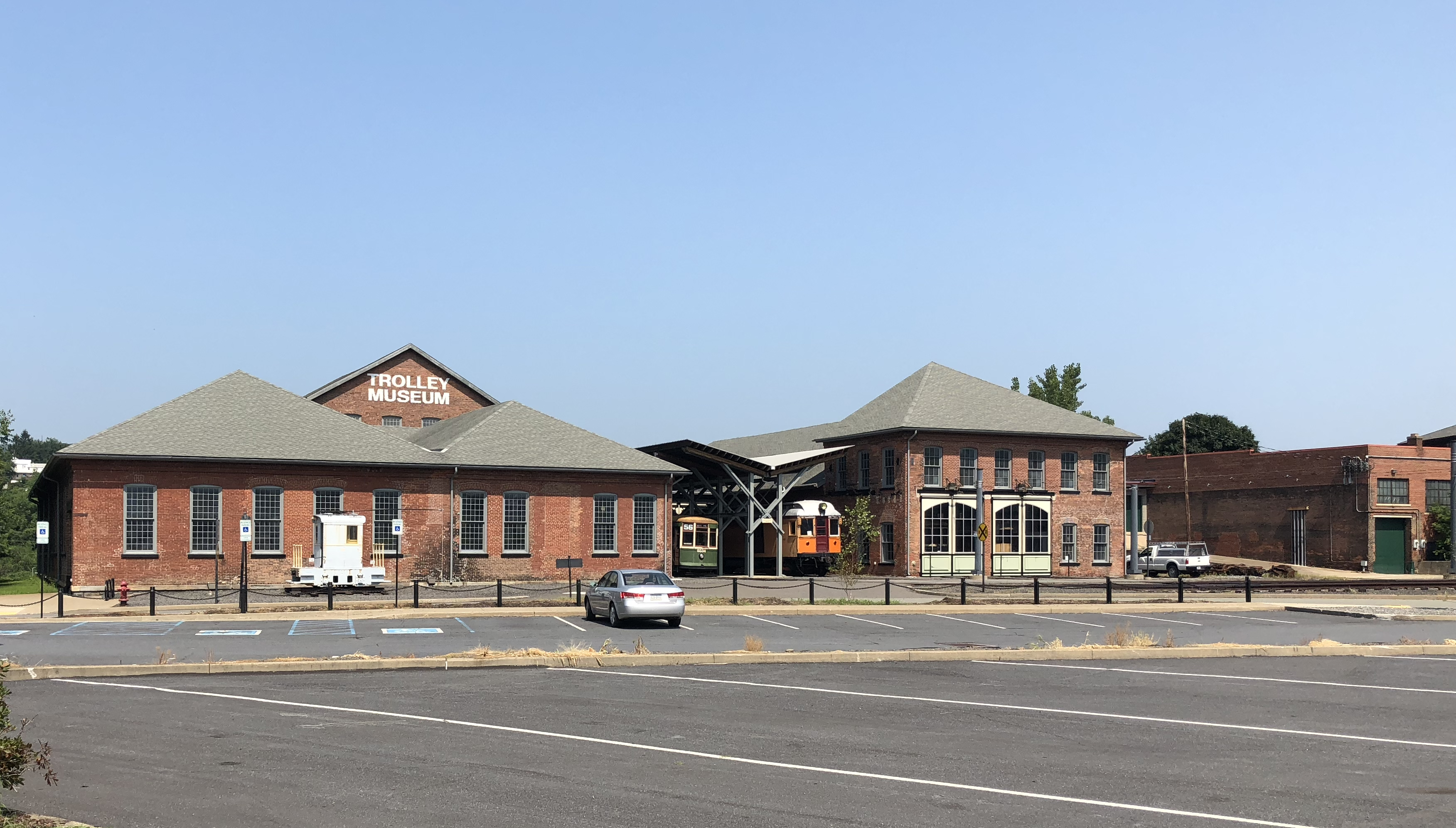
- The Electric City Trolley Museum in August 2018
- Established: 1999
- Location: Scranton, Pennsylvania
- Type: transport museum
- Website: www.ectma.org

The Electric City Trolley Museum is a transport museum located in downtown Scranton, Pennsylvania, next to the Steamtown National Historic Site. The museum displays and operates restored trolleys and interurbans on former lines of the Lackawanna and Wyoming Valley Railroad, which are now owned by the government of Lackawanna County and operated by the Delaware-Lackawanna Railroad.

== History ==
Established in 1999, the Electric City Trolley Museum is owned by the Electric City Trolley Museum Association. The museum began as Metropolitan Philadelphia Railway Association in the 1960s. Its first car site was in the Tansboro section of Winslow Township, New Jersey, then on a 4.5-acre (1.8 ha) site in the Jobstown section of Springfield Township, Burlington County, New Jersey through which a portion of railroad track ran. The local residents did not want a tourist attraction in their backyard and the governing body passed an ordinance in 1973 prohibiting trolley operation in the municipality.

In 1978, the group was renamed the Buckingham Valley Trolley Association when it relocated to Buckingham Township, Pennsylvania. The trolleys then operated on a portion of what is now the New Hope Railroad. As of 2019 the museum still maintained a restoration shop in the Township. In 1982, the trolley operation was moved to the Delaware River waterfront in Philadelphia as the Penns Landing Trolley. There the line operated on the Belt Line Railroad from the Benjamin Franklin Bridge to Fitzwater Street. Real estate development pressure however forced the museum to move the cars from pier to pier several times. When the cars had to be moved to an outdoor location at Laurel Street they were vandalized and electrical components stripped by scrap thieves. The museum left Penns Landing in 1996 to relocate to Scranton.

== Exhibits ==
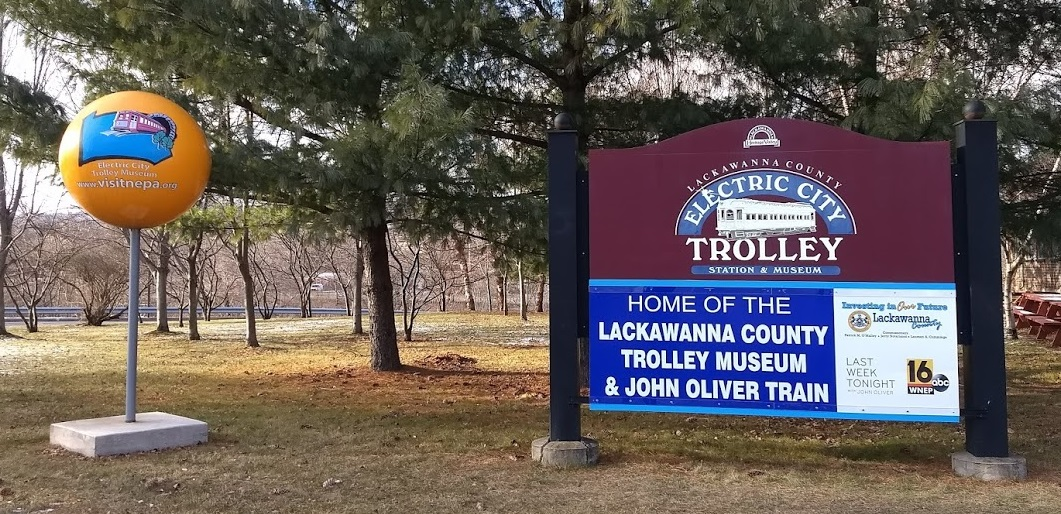
Entrance to the museum

The museum displays and operates restored trolleys and interurbans on former lines of the Lackawanna and Wyoming Valley Railroad, now owned by the government of Lackawanna County and operated by the Delaware-Lackawanna Railroad.

In 2006, the museum opened a 2,000-foot (610 m) extension connecting the county's trolley line from the Steamtown National Historic Site to a new station and trolley restoration facility next to PNC Field in Moosic, Pennsylvania. The trip, including a long tunnel, replicates a typical 1920s interurban ride. The new tracks and trolley barn are part of a $2 million project financed by capital funds from the county and the state. The barn has space for up to nine trolleys, allowing the county museum to spend more time working to bring defunct cars back to running order. It has a gallery where visitors can observe the repairs.

In September 2017, the museum became home to a model train scene depicting Scranton. The diorama had been gifted to WNEP-TV by Last Week Tonight with John Oliver to replace the train in the news station's backyard, but it was too large.

== Gallery ==
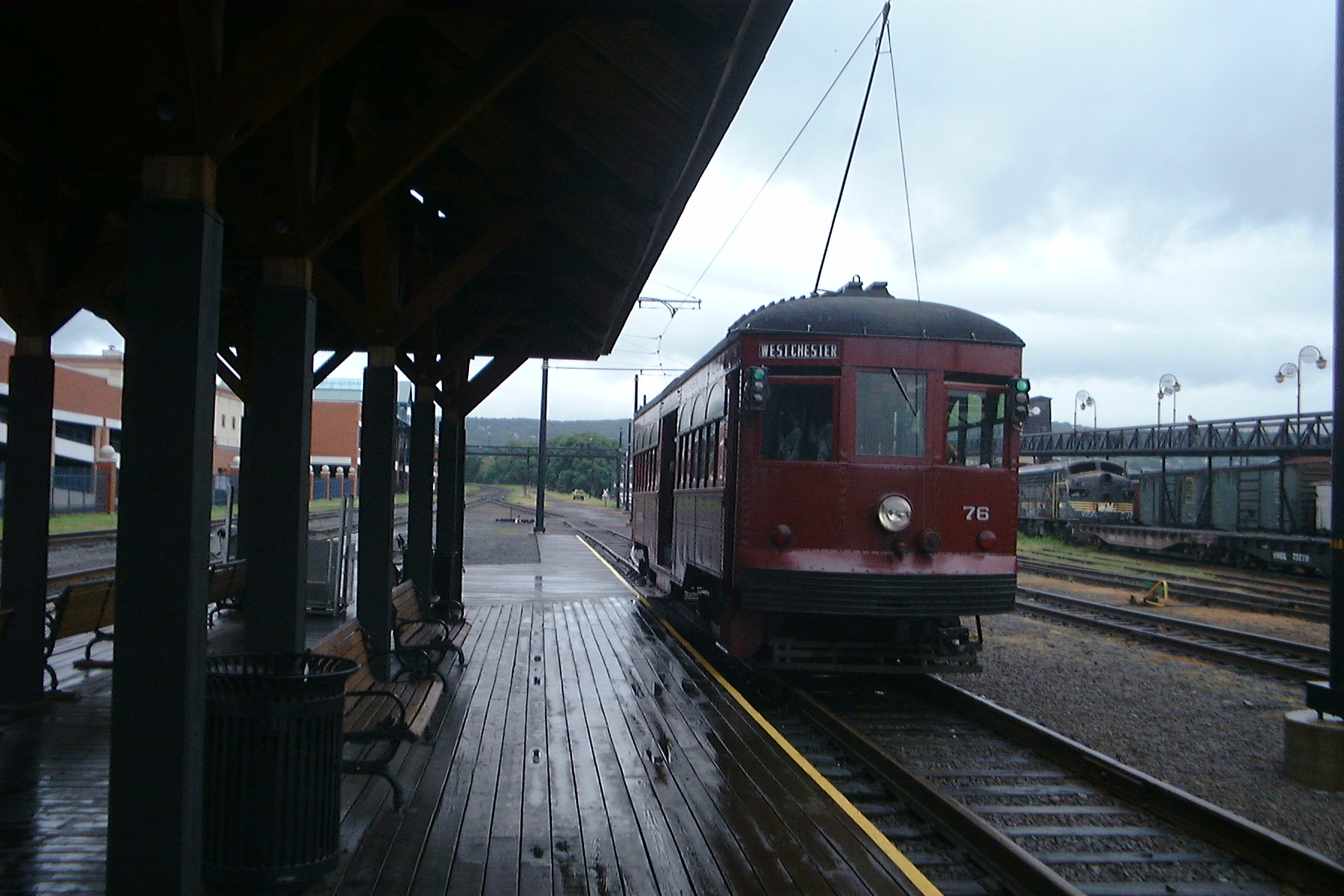
Trolley museum car 76 at the museum station

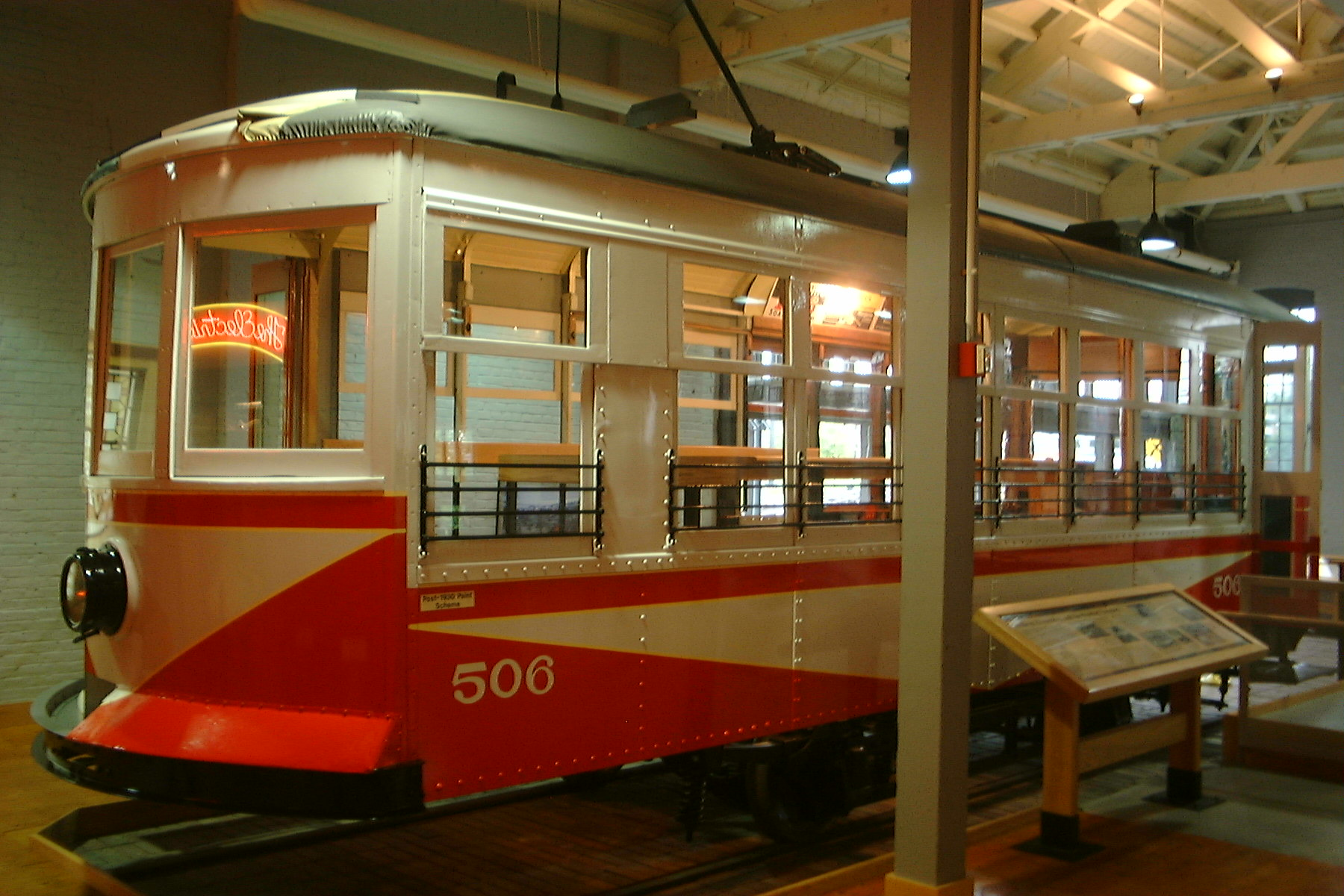
Trolley car 506 on display inside the museum

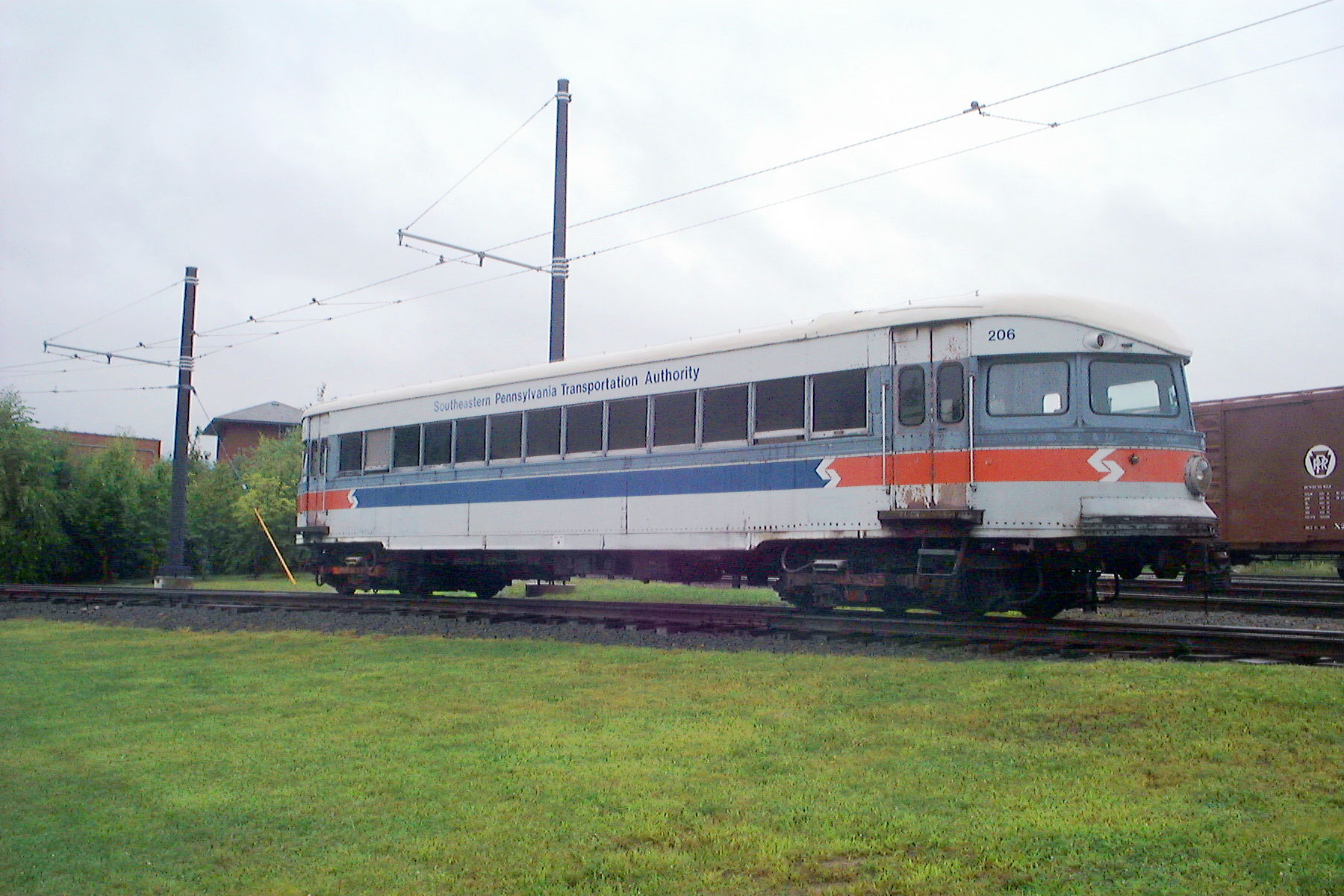
SEPTA Brill Bullet #206

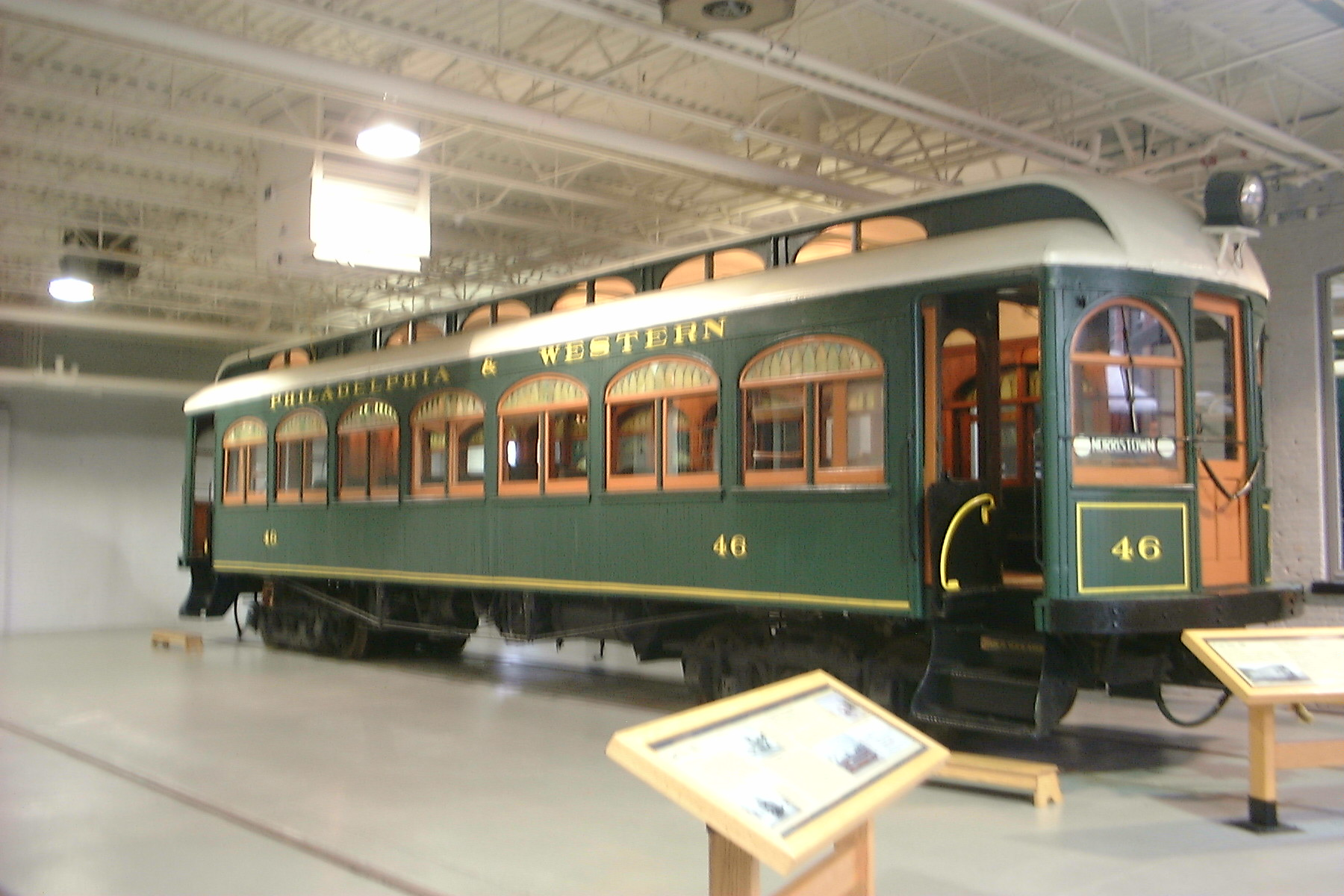
Philadelphia & Western #46

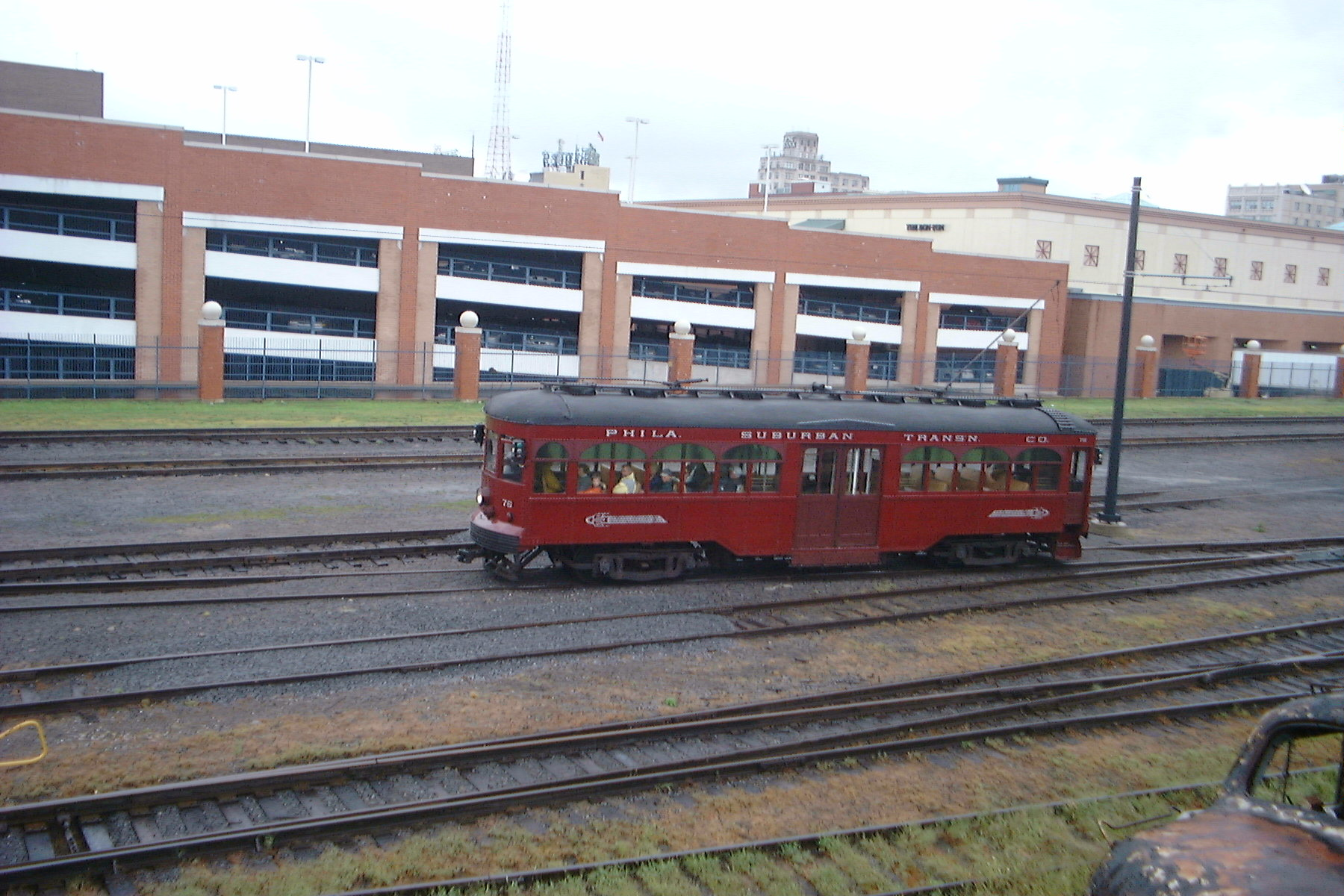
Car 76 leaving the museum

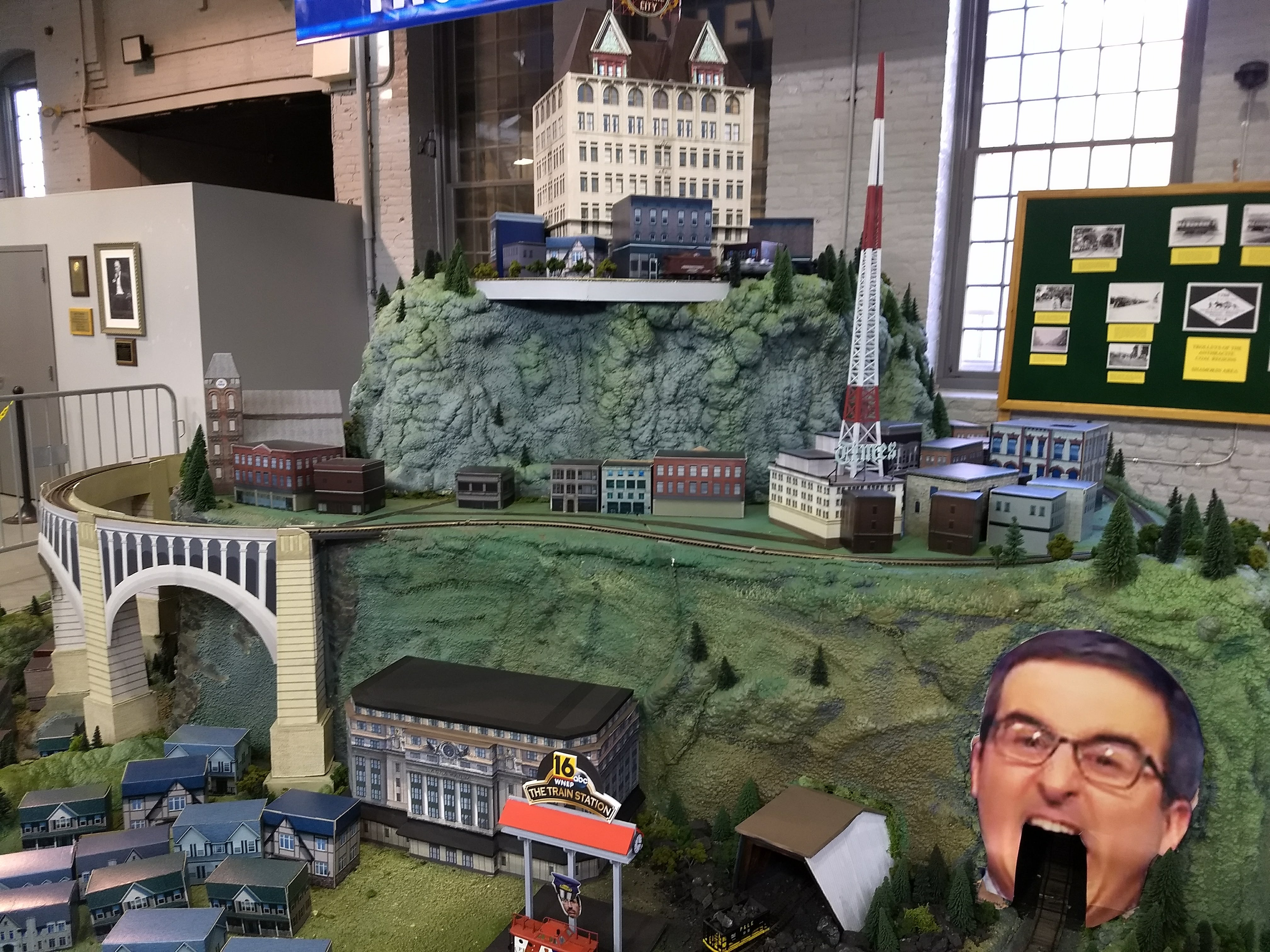
The John Oliver display

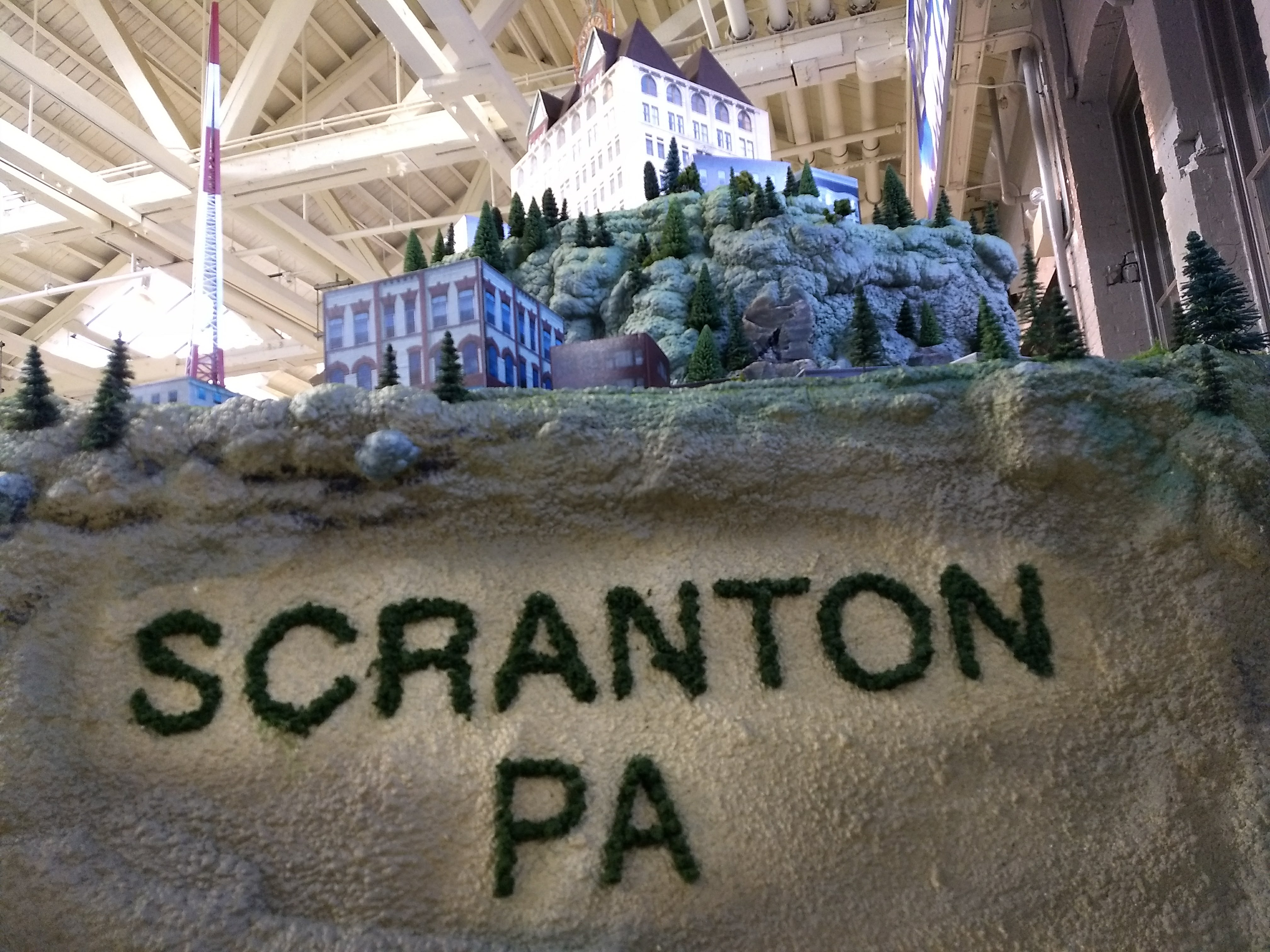
Alternate view of the John Oliver display

== See also ==
- Steamtown National Historic Site
