= Henry Curtis =

Henry Curtis may refer to:

- Henry Curtis (VC) (1822–1896), English recipient of the Victoria Cross
- Henry Curtis (British Army officer) (1888–1964), British Army officer
- Sir Henry Curtis, fictional character in adventure novels
- H. W. Curtis, American millwright and politician
- Henry Curtis, fictional character in the novel 419

== See also ==
- Harry Curtis (disambiguation)
