= President Biden Expressway =

Highway in Scranton, Pennsylvania, US

President Joseph R. Biden, Jr. Expressway
- Central Scranton Expressway

Route information
- Maintained by PennDOT
- Length: 0.755 mi (1,215 m)
- Existed: 1964–present
- Component highways: SR 3022 (unsigned; entire length)

Major junctions
- West end: Cedar Avenue / US 11 / PA 307 in Scranton
- East end: I-81 in Scranton

Location
- Country: United States
- State: Pennsylvania
- Counties: Lackawanna

Highway system
- Pennsylvania State Route System; Interstate; US; State; Scenic; Legislative

The President Joseph R. Biden, Jr. Expressway, formerly known as the Central Scranton Expressway, is a 0.76-mile-long (1.22 km) freeway in Scranton in the U.S. state of Pennsylvania. It runs east-southeast from U.S. Route 11 (US 11)/Pennsylvania Route 307 (PA 307) and Cedar Avenue near Downtown Scranton to Interstate 81 (I-81).

The highway is one of only three freeways in Pennsylvania with no posted route number. In the Location Referencing System, it is designated as unsigned State Route 3022 by the Pennsylvania Department of Transportation (PennDOT). In 2021, the road was renamed after Joe Biden, the 46th president of the United States, who was born in Scranton.

== Route description ==
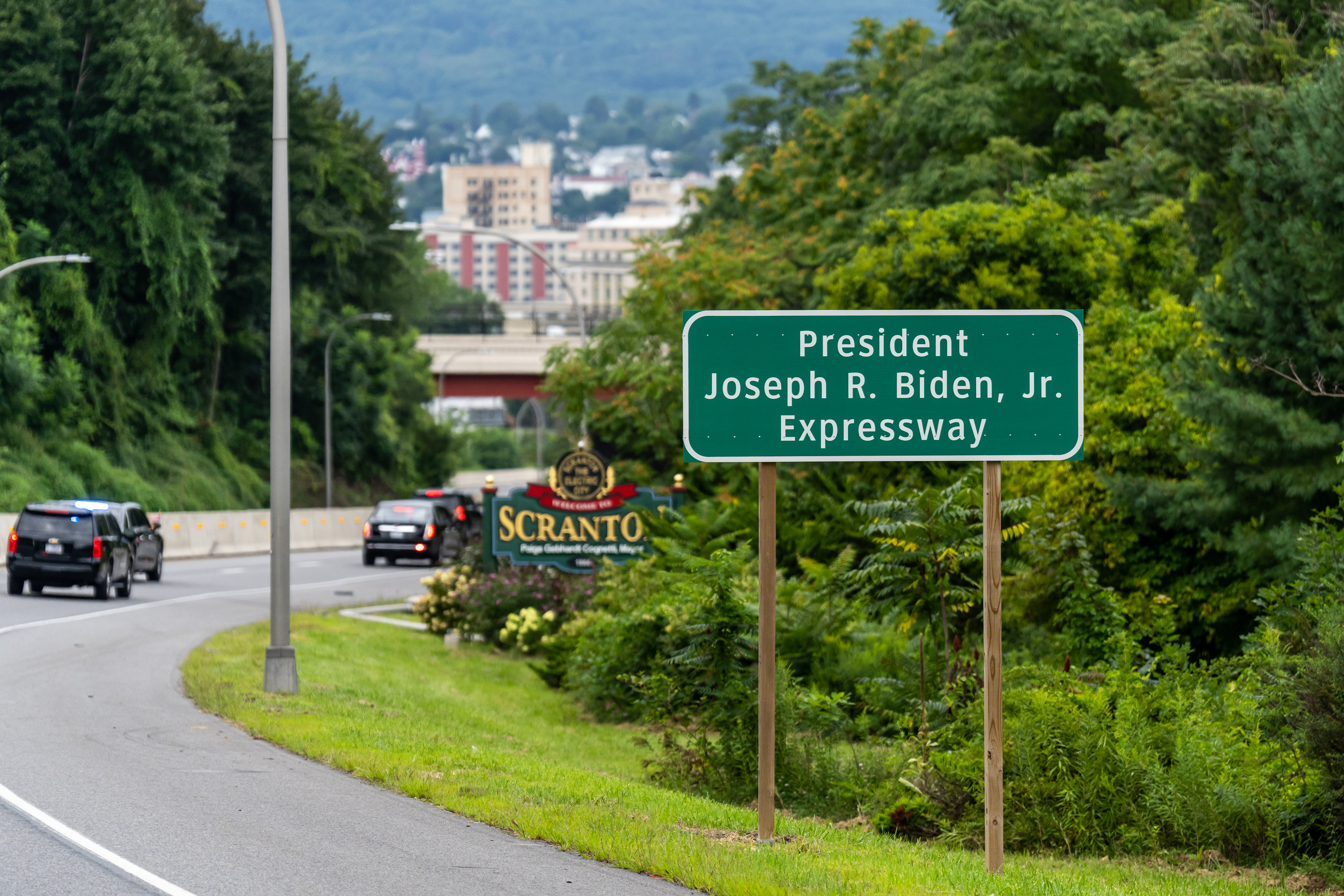
Beginning of the expressway westbound near its eastern terminus

The President Biden Expressway is a four-lane controlled-access highway that runs for 0.755 miles (1.215 km) through Scranton, Pennsylvania, and parallels the southern bank of Roaring Brook, a tributary of the Lackawanna River, for its entire duration. The expressway travels from northwest to southeast, with no intermediate exits between its termini.

From its western terminus, the expressway begins at an interchange near Downtown Scranton. The westbound direction splits into two ramps: a two-way ramp connecting to Cedar Avenue (SR 3023) and a one-way ramp to US 11/PA 307 north (signed as "Central City / University / Colleges"). Entrances to the expressway from Cedar Avenue and US 11 south are marked with signage reading "To I-81/I-84/I-380".

At 0.387 miles (0.623 km) along the route, the freeway passes under the Harrison Avenue Bridge. At its eastern terminus, the expressway splits into two ramps at a T-interchange with I-81; the ramp to I-81 north directs traffic to Binghamton, New York, I-84, and I-380, and the ramp to I-81 south directs traffic to Wilkes-Barre, Pennsylvania.

== History ==
Construction began in 1964 alongside the adjacent section of I-81. The road was built along a portion of the former Lackawanna and Wyoming Valley Railroad right-of-way passing beneath the Harrison Avenue Bridge. It opened with a temporary western terminus feeding into Front Street at Prospect Avenue. By the early 1970s, the current interchange at the western terminus was opened, connecting to a new road replacing the demolished Spruce Street Bridge.

In July 2021, there was a proposal to rename the Central Scranton Expressway after incumbent U.S. President Joe Biden, who was born in Scranton. On July 20, 2021, the Scranton City Council unanimously voted to rename the Central Scranton Expressway to the President Joseph R. Biden Jr. Expressway along with renaming Spruce Street to Biden Street. PennDOT replaced signage on the northbound lanes of I-81 on September 29, 2021, and replaced signage on the southbound lanes of I-81 on the following day. The sign installation was completed on October 4, 2021, at the exit 185 off ramp along I-81.

In December 2024, local residents and multiple state politicians called for Biden's name to be removed from the expressway after he controversially commuted the sentence of Michael Conahan, a judge responsible for the kids for cash scandal that took place in neighboring Luzerne County. However, Scranton mayor Paige Cognetti and the city council declined to remove the signs.

== In popular culture ==
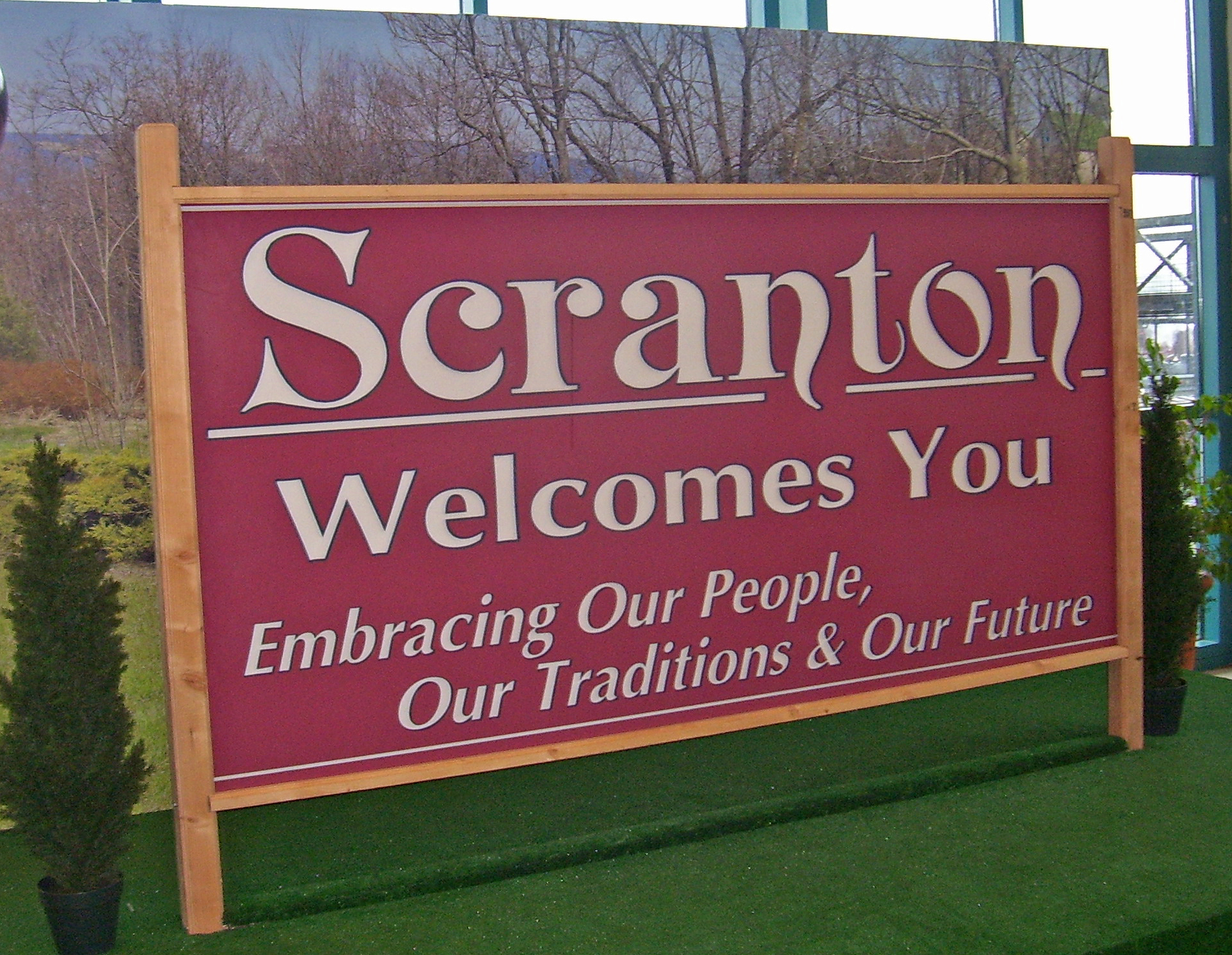
Replica of the expressway's former welcome sign inside the Marketplace at Steamtown

A sign reading "Scranton Welcomes You" previously existed on the expressway westbound near the I-81 interchange, and was featured in the opening credits of the TV series The Office (2005–2013). Due to its popularity with vehicles stopping along the expressway for photos, the sign was removed and a replica was installed inside the Marketplace at Steamtown (formerly the Steamtown Mall) in Downtown Scranton.

== Exit list ==
The entire route is in Scranton, Lackawanna County.

mi	km	Destinations	Notes
0.000	0.000	Cedar Avenue	Western terminus; unsigned SR 3023
0.000	0.000	Central City / University / Colleges	Western terminus; access via US 11/PA 307 north; entrance via US 11 south
0.755	1.215	I-81 north to I-84 / I-380 – Binghamton	Eastern terminus; exit 185 on I-81
0.755	1.215	I-81 south – Wilkes-Barre	Eastern terminus; exit 185 on I-81
1.000 mi = 1.609 km; 1.000 km = 0.621 mi

== See also ==
- North Scranton Expressway
