= Harry F. Curtis =

American politician

Harry Fitz William Curtis (1871-March 24, 1939) was an engineer and Pennsylvania state representative. Born in Canada, he moved to Philadelphia, Pennsylvania, in his early youth. He was the proprietor of Curtis and Hill Gravel and Sand Co. As a partner in the Philadelphia contracting firm Reiter, Curtis & Hill, he helped build the Paulinskill Viaduct in Knowlton Township, New Jersey, in 1908-10. Part of the Lackawanna Cut-Off, one of the largest railroad infrastructure projects of its time, the viaduct was at the time the largest reinforced concrete structure in the world. Curtis was elected as a Republican to the Pennsylvania House of Representatives in 1908; he did not win reelection for the 1911 term.

Curtis died March 24, 1939, in Port St. Lucie, St. Lucie County, Florida, and was buried in Laurel Hill Cemetery in Bala Cynwyd, Pennsylvania.
