= Delaware-Lackawanna Railroad =

American shortline railroad

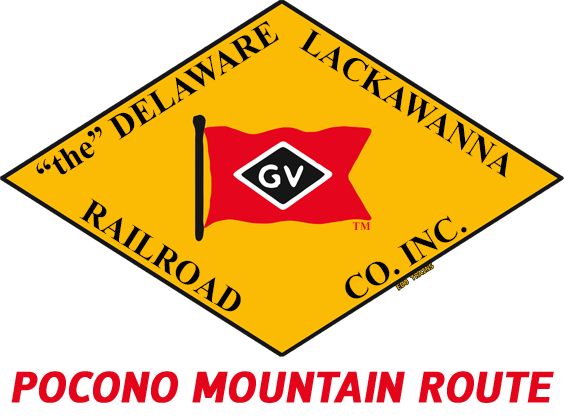

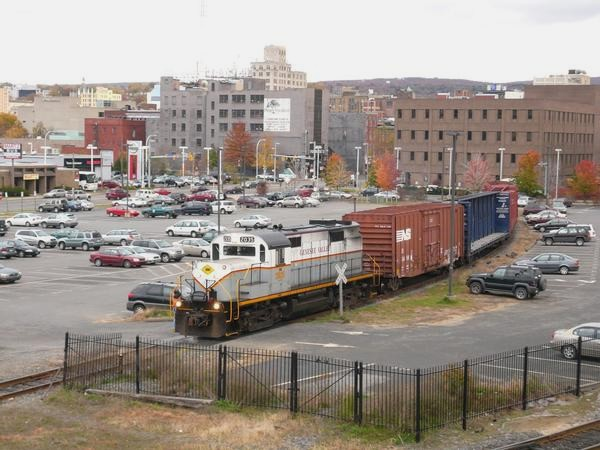
- DL RS32 #2035 switches the Diamond Branch in Scranton, Pennsylvania. Locomotive was built as NYC 8035

Overview
- Headquarters: Batavia, New York (GVT Corporate headquarters), Scranton, Pennsylvania (DL main office)
- Reporting mark: DL
- Locale: Northeastern Pennsylvania
- Dates of operation: 1993–Present
- Predecessor: Conrail; Delaware and Hudson Railway

Technical
- Track gauge: 4 ft 8 1/2 in (1,435 mm) standard gauge
- Length: 88 miles (142 kilometres)

Other
- Website: Genesee Valley Transportation Co., Inc.

The Delaware-Lackawanna Railroad (reporting mark DL) is a shortline railroad operating in Northeastern Pennsylvania, especially the Scranton area.

DL began service in August 1993 and is the designated operator for 88 miles (142 kilometres) of trackage in Lackawanna, Wayne, Northampton, and Monroe Counties. It is a subsidiary of holding company Genesee Valley Transportation Company, Inc. (GVT). It was founded by Jeffrey Baxter, Charles Riedmiller, John Herbrand, Michael Thomas and David Monte Verde who continue to make up its corporate ownership.

== Overview ==
GVT began in 1985 in upstate New York marketing rail-related services to both private and public industry throughout the northeast.

Under contract with the Pennsylvania Northeast Regional Railroad Authority (PNRRA), who owns the rail assets and properties, GVT operates within Lackawanna, Wayne, Monroe, and Northampton counties on these following lines:

- from Scranton northeast to the city of Carbondale on the former Delaware & Hudson Railway's Penn Division mainline (now called the Carbondale Mainline)
- from Scranton southeast to Slateford Junction in Monroe County on the former Delaware, Lackawanna & Western Railroad's (DL&W) Southern Division mainline (now called the Pocono Mainline)
- from Scranton southwest to Montage Mountain and Minooka on lines of the former Lackawanna & Wyoming Valley Railroad electric interurban streetcar line, known as the Laurel Line. The line is still known as the Laurel Line with the Minooka Industrial Track connected to it.

As of 2022 there are about 25 active rail industries in the region with the possibility of several new rail dependent industrial prospects for the region.

These are the lines hosting the seasonal passenger trains of both the Steamtown National Historic Site, the Electric City Trolley Museum, and the Erie Lackawanna Dining Car Preservation Society. The Pocono Mainline has hosted a number of excursions out of Steamtown, including excursions of the Nickel Plate 765.

In 2015 the authority extended DL's lease for five years.

== Poconos expansion ==
The DL interchanges with Norfolk Southern Railway in Taylor, Pennsylvania, Norfolk Southern in Portland, Pennsylvania via Slateford Junction near Delaware Water Gap, Pennsylvania, and the Reading Blue Mountain & Northern Railroad via Duryea Yard (formerly Coxton Yard) outside Pittston, Pennsylvania, thus connecting to the Great Lakes via Sayre Yard and New Jersey and New York City via former Central Railroad of New Jersey (CNJ).

In the summer of 1998, under a haulage agreement with Canadian Pacific Railway (CP), the DL had operated unit Canadian grain trains between Taylor, Pennsylvania and the Ardent Mills Grain Mill at Pocono Summit, Pennsylvania. Operated by DL crews, these trains averaged approximately 52 cars. The grain trains to Ardent Mills Grain Mill still continue, but the haulage agreement is now with Norfolk Southern since NS now owns Taylor Yard.

== Equipment roster ==
The DL is renowned as a bastion for both rebuilding and operating 70+ year-old ALCo and MLW diesels on a daily basis.

A new unified color scheme of gray and white with red and yellow stripes was to be applied to GVT system units beginning in 2006 as they exit the South Scranton shops; the most recent being rebuilt ALCO C425 No. 2457 in the summer of 2016. No. 3000 appeared in September 2016.

Model	Numbers	Year built	Status	Notes
ALCo PA-4	#190	1948	Operational	Built as ATSF PA-1 #62L, later became one of four PA-1s sold to the Delaware and Hudson in 1967. Later rebuilt by Morrison–Knudsen into a PA-4 in the mid-1970s. Later served MBTA and FNM before being purchased by Doyle McCormack in 2000 and went under multi-year restoration at the Oregon Rail Heritage Center, becoming "Nickel Plate Road #190." Later purchased by the DL in May 2023 and restoration was complete in June 2025, making its public debut that July.
ALCo RS-32	#2002, #2035	1962	Operational	Built as Southern Pacific #7302 before being renumbered to #4002. Later served on various shortlines including the ET&WNC and a few others before becoming DL #211 in the early 2000s. Recently repainted and renumbered to #2002 in 2023. #2035 built as New York Central #8035 and served Penn Central, Conrail and various shortlines until ending up on the DL in the early 2000s.
ALCo RS-11	#351, #1804, #1805, #1870	1956-1959	#1804 operational, remainder out of service.	#351 of Norfolk and Western heritage, #1804 and #1805 built for the Duluth, Winnipeg and Pacific and #1870 built for the Southern Pacific.
ALCo C420	#41, #405, #414, #7222	1964-1965	#41 and #7222 out of service, #405 and #414 operational.	#41 built for the Long Island Railroad, #405 and #414 built for the Lehigh Valley and #7222 built for the Erie Mining Company. #414 painted in Lehigh Valley colors.
ALCo RS-3	#134, #204, #4068	1950-1952	#134 and #204 out of service, #4068 operational.	#134 built for the New York Central, #204 built for the Lehigh and Hudson River and #4068 built for the Delaware and Hudson. #4068 painted in Delaware and Hudson colors in July 2025.
MLW M-420W	#3560	1976	Operational.	Built as Canadian National #2560, later renumbered to #3560 before being sold to the West Tennessee Railroad, keeping its number. Later sold again to DL in mid-2000s.
ALCo C424	#2403, #2409, #4204	1964-1965	#2403 and #2409 operational, #4204 out of service.	#2403 built for the Spokane, Portland and Seattle, #2409 built for the Wabash and #4204 built for the Canadian Pacific.
ALCo C425	#327, #2423, #2452, #2457, #2461	1964-1966	#327 out of service, remainder operational.	#327 and #2457 built for the Spokane, Portland and Seattle, #2423 built for the Pennsylvania Railroad and #2452 and #2461 built for the Erie Lackawanna. Both 2452 and 2461 have been repainted into their Erie Lackawanna liveries as of 2025.
ALCo C636	#3642	1968	Operational.	Built as Penn Central #6342, became Conrail #6792 and Delta Terminal #1001 before being purchased by the DL, being numbered #6793 before being renumbered to #3642 in late 2002. Most notable for being the only non-rebuilt C636 in existence.
MLW M630	#643, #1776	1970	#1776 operational	#1776 built as Pacific Great Eastern #707, later became BC Rail #707 before becoming a General Electric testbed and eventually DL #3007. Repainted in May 2026 for the United States Semiquincentennial in a Delaware and Hudson-inspired scheme.
MLW M636	#637, #638, #685, #3000, #3643	1968-1975	#638 and #685 out of service, remainder operational.	#637 built for the Canadian National, #638 and #685 built for the Quebec Cartier Railroad, #3000 built for the Pacific Great Eastern and #3643 built for the Canadian Pacific.
EMC SC	#426	1935	Out of service, on display at the Steamtown National Historic Site.	Built as DL&W #426. Later went with a few owners before the Erie Lackwanna merger until ending up on the DL's roster in the early 2000s.
EMD GP8	#5460	1952	Out of service.	Built as DL&W GP7 #959, later became EL #1278 and Conrail #5460, after being rebuilt into a GP8 in 1978. Later sold to DL between 1993 and 1995.

== Recent activity ==
- A new 2,000-foot extension connects the county's trolley line, the Electric City Trolley Museum, from the Steamtown National Historic Site, Scranton, to a new station and trolley restoration facility, immediately adjacent to the Scranton/Wilkes-Barre Highlanders stadium, PNC Field, off Montage Mountain Road in Moosic.
- The 2006 Annual Convention of the American Association of Private Railroad Car Owners (AAPRCO) took place in Scranton on DL at the Steamtown National Historic Site on site behind the Marketplace at Steamtown September 20–24, 2006, traveling via Cincinnati-Chicago-St. Albans, Vermont-Scranton-Chicago-Cincinnati route over the 14-day event. Many past Presidential and historic rail cars attended with a round-trip steam-powered run to the Delaware Water Gap on September 21, 2006.
- The 2010 Annual Convention of the National Railway Historical Society took place in Scranton on June 22–26, 2010, with numerous events run on DL lines.
- DL has been the motive power for several trips run by the Erie-Lackawanna Dining Car Preservation Society, a preservation group that owns and operates several historic passenger cars, including a Nickel Plate Road (NKP) Pullman sleeper and two Budd Company dining cars from DL&W's Phoebe Snow.
- In connection with the Anthracite Railroads Historical Society, DL started operating a heritage fleet, including a CNJ RS-3 and Lehigh Valley Railroad C420.
- Starting in 2017, Office Car Specials and inspection trains have become more frequent on DL. These trains use a mix of ELDCPS and company-owned passenger equipment, most notably NKP sleeper No. 211 City of Lima, DL&W diner No. 469, and Erie Lackawanna Railway business car No. 2.
- Completed in September 2020, the DL constructed a new shop for their locomotives, the Von Storch Locomotive Shops. The new shop is located in the Green Ridge Yard in Scranton. Genesee Valley Transportation Co., Inc. Invested more than $2 million into the new shop.
