= Lackawanna and Wyoming Valley Railroad =

Former rail electric streetcar in Scranton, Pennsylvania, U.S.

Lackawanna & Wyoming Valley Railroad

Overview
- Parent company: Westinghouse, Church, Kerr & Company (originally); Delaware, Lackawanna and Western Railroad (1957-1960); Erie Lackawanna (1960-1976)
- Headquarters: Scranton, Pennsylvania
- Reporting mark: LWV
- Locale: Northeastern Pennsylvania
- Dates of operation: 1903–1976
- Successor: Conrail; later: Delaware-Lackawanna Railroad; Electric City Trolley Museum

Technical
- Track gauge: 4 ft 8 1/2 in (1,435 mm) standard gauge

The Lackawanna & Wyoming Valley Railroad, more commonly known as the Laurel Line, was a Pennsylvania third rail electric interurban streetcar line which operated commuter train service from 1903 to 1952, and freight service until 1976. Its main line ran from Scranton to Wilkes-Barre.

== History ==
The line was originally owned and built by Westinghouse, Church, Kerr & Company, a subsidiary of The Westinghouse Electric & Manufacturing Company. The Westinghouse group also owned the Grand Rapids, Grand Haven & Muskegon Railway, which was under construction in the same time period. Westinghouse interests controlled the railroad until 1914.

Electrification was decommissioned in 1953, as diesel operations began. It was purchased by the Delaware, Lackawanna and Western Railroad in 1957, but operated as an independent subsidiary under it and the Erie Lackawanna until its inclusion in Conrail in 1976.

Sections of the line operate today for both freight and tourists under local county ownership, with talk of future commuter expansion.

=== Train disaster ===
On July 3, 1920, three trains collided on the Lackawanna and Wyoming Valley Railroad in the village of Sebastopol in Jenkins Township. Eighteen people were killed and thirty more were injured.

“Almost all persons killed in the wreck were passengers in the Limited coach into which the first car of the local train plunged, crashing its way to its full length through the Limited coach, completely telescoping it,” reported the Wilkes-Barre Record on July 5, 1920.

== Routes ==
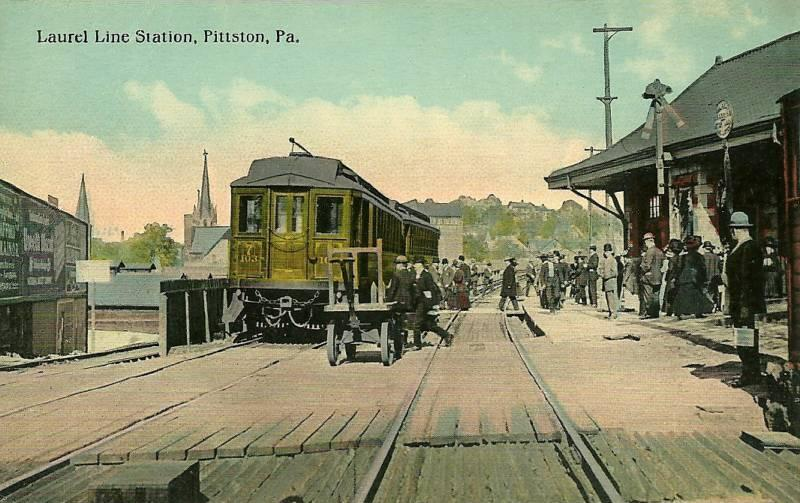
Pittston depot c. 1912

The railroad's main line ran from Scranton to Wilkes-Barre. Other cities served included Dunmore and Pittston.

At its peak, the line carried as many as 4.2 million passengers a year, but following World War II use declined dramatically. In 1964, the President Biden Expressway was built over a portion of L&WV right-of-way along Roaring Brook in Scranton. Interstate 81 construction paralleled the north-south route in the 1960s and today the four-lane highway is overtaxed with heavy trucks and cars, local traffic between Wilkes-Barre and Scranton and a deteriorating structure, leaving county planners wishing the L&WV system was retained in its entirety.

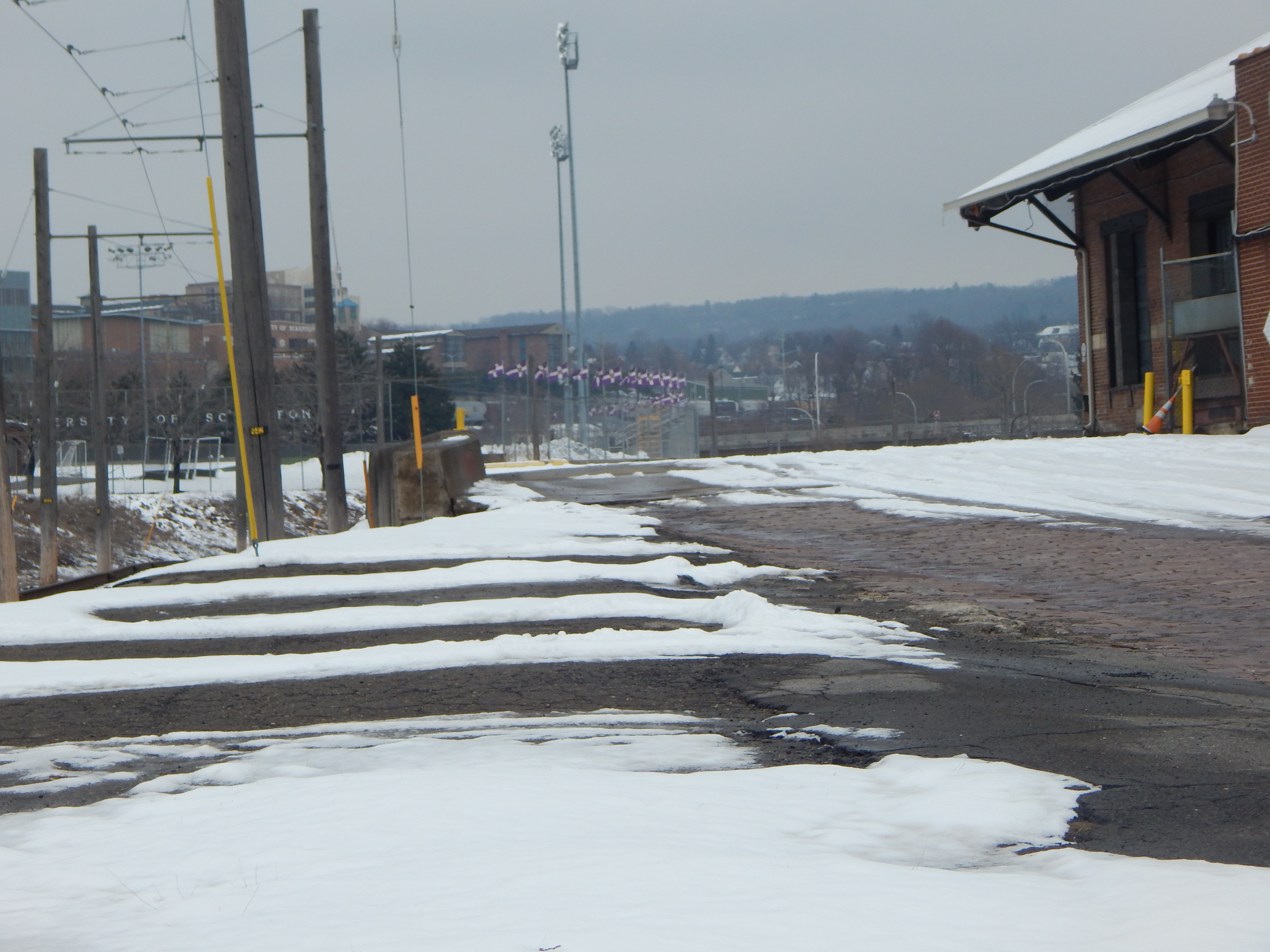
The Scranton freight station for the Laurel Line

Original sections of the line out of Scranton to Montage Mountain, Moosic, have been purchased by Lackawanna County, Pennsylvania, and placed back in service with overhead electrified wiring and designated-operator Delaware-Lackawanna Railroad overseeing both freight operations and the county's tourist trolley runs, the Electric City Trolley Museum.

The Laurel Line Tunnel (also known as the Crown Avenue Tunnel) in South Scranton, constructed in 1904, remains one of the longest interurban streetcar tunnels ever built, at 4,750-feet. It was recently rehabilitated at a cost of over $3 million.

The cost to restore much of the original line today would be less than expanding Interstate 81, according to Larry Malski, president of the Pennsylvania Northeast Regional Railroad Authority. "I think it's very feasible."

== Laurel Line stops ==
=== Main Line ===
| County | Station | Type | Notes |
|---|---|---|---|
| Lackawanna | Scranton | Station | Connections to the Lackawanna Railroad and the Dunmore Branch |
| Lackawanna | South Scranton | Shelter | |
| Lackawanna | Connell Junction | Flag | |
| Lackawanna | Virginia | Flag | Connections to the Minooka Branch. |
| Lackawanna | Rocky Glen Park | Shelter | |
| Lackawanna | Moosic | Shelter | |
| Luzerne | Avoca | Station | |
| Luzerne | South Avoca | Shelter | |
| Luzerne | Heidelberg | Flag | |
| Luzerne | Dupont | Shelter | |
| Luzerne | North Pittston | Shelter | |
| Luzerne | Pittston | Station | Connections to the Erie Railroad |
| Luzerne | South Pittston | Shelter | |
| Luzerne | Ewen | Shelter | |
| Luzerne | Inkerman | Shelter | |
| Luzerne | Number 14 | Shelter | |
| Luzerne | Hillsdale | Shelter | |
| Luzerne | North Plains | Shelter | |
| Luzerne | Plains | Station | |
| Luzerne | Midvale | Shelter | |
| Luzerne | River Street | Shelter | |
| Luzerne | Wilkes-Barre | Station | Connections to the Lehigh Valley Railroad |

=== Dunmore Branch ===
| County | Station | Type | Notes |
|---|---|---|---|
| Lackawanna | Maple Street | Shelter | |
| Lackawanna | Waldorf | Shelter | |
| Lackawanna | Nay Aug | Shelter | |
| Lackawanna | Myrtle Street | Shelter | |
| Lackawanna | Petersburg | Shelter | |

== Recent activity ==
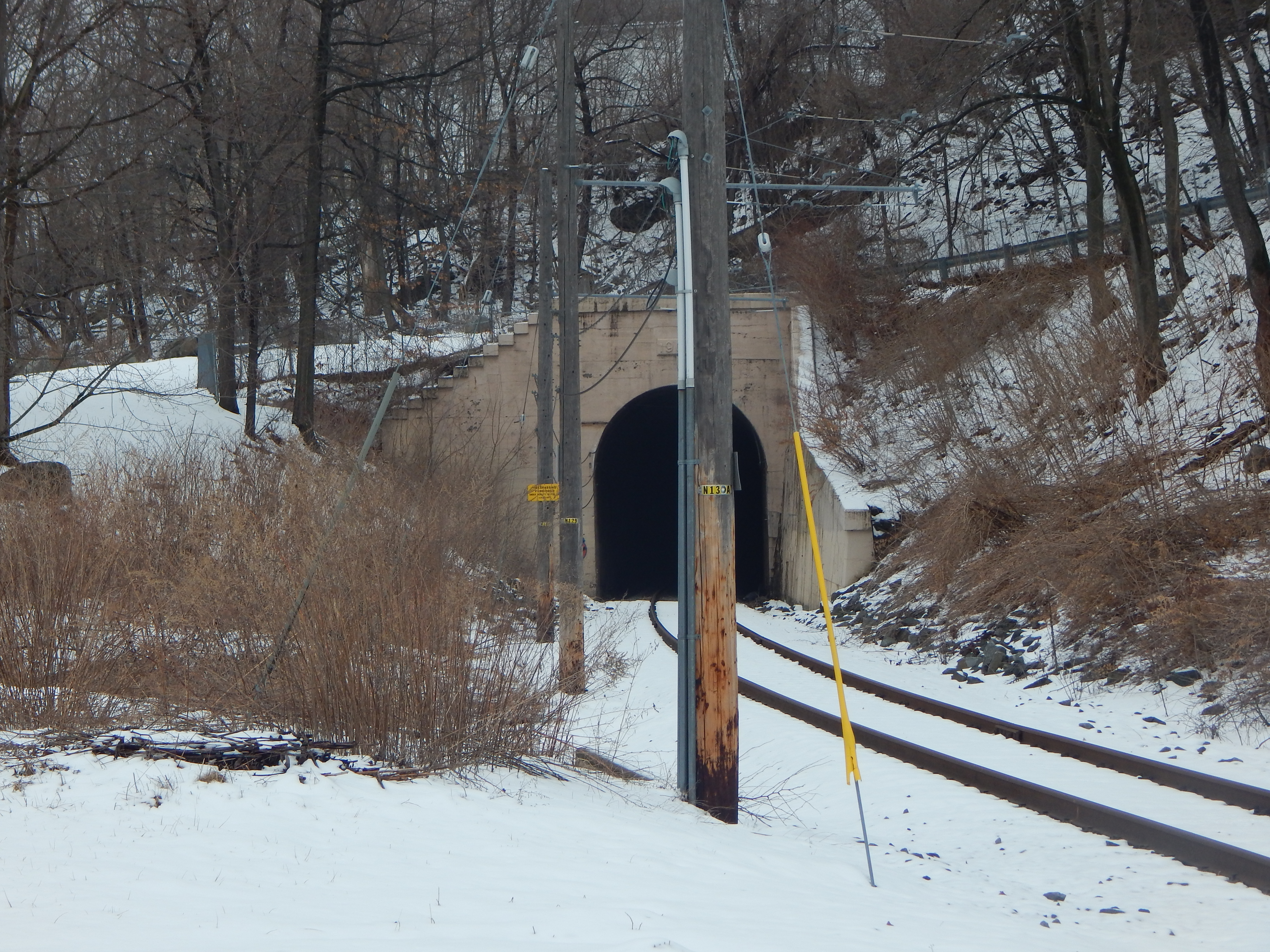
The Edward S. Miller (Crown Avenue) Tunnel in March 2015

For 2006, a new, 2,000-foot extension connects the county's trolley line from the Steamtown National Historic Site, Scranton, to a new station and trolley restoration facility, immediately adjacent to the PNC Field stadium off Montage Mountain Road, Moosic and home of the Scranton/Wilkes-Barre Highlanders.

The new tracks and trolley barn are part of a $2 million project financed by capital funds from the county and the state. The barn has space for up to nine trolleys, allowing the county museum to spend more time working to bring defunct cars back to running order. It has a gallery where visitors can observe the process.
