= Paulinskill Viaduct =

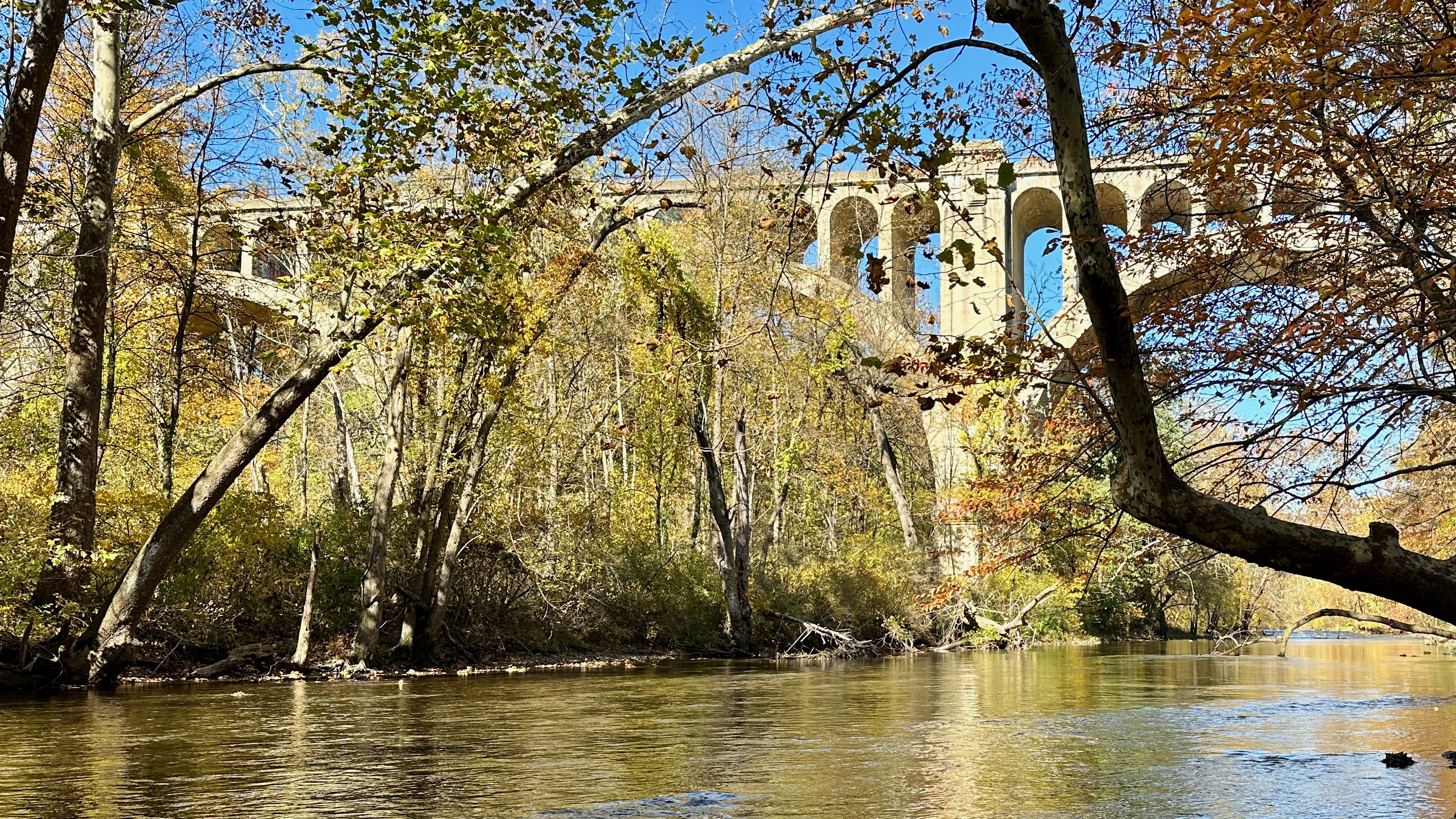
- Crossing the Paulins Kill
- Coordinates: 40.9480°N 75.0613°W
- Crosses: Paulins Kill
- Locale: Hainesburg, New Jersey
- Maintained by: New Jersey Department of Transportation

Characteristics
- Design: reinforced concrete arch
- Total length: 1,100 feet (340 m)
- Clearance below: 115 feet (35 m)

History
- Opened: December 24, 1911
- Closed: Still extant (railroad tracks removed in 1984)

Location
- Interactive map of Paulinskill Viaduct

The Paulinskill Viaduct, also known as the Hainesburg Viaduct, is a reinforced concrete railroad bridge that crosses the Paulins Kill in Knowlton Township, New Jersey. When completed in 1910, it was the largest reinforced concrete structure in the world.

== History ==
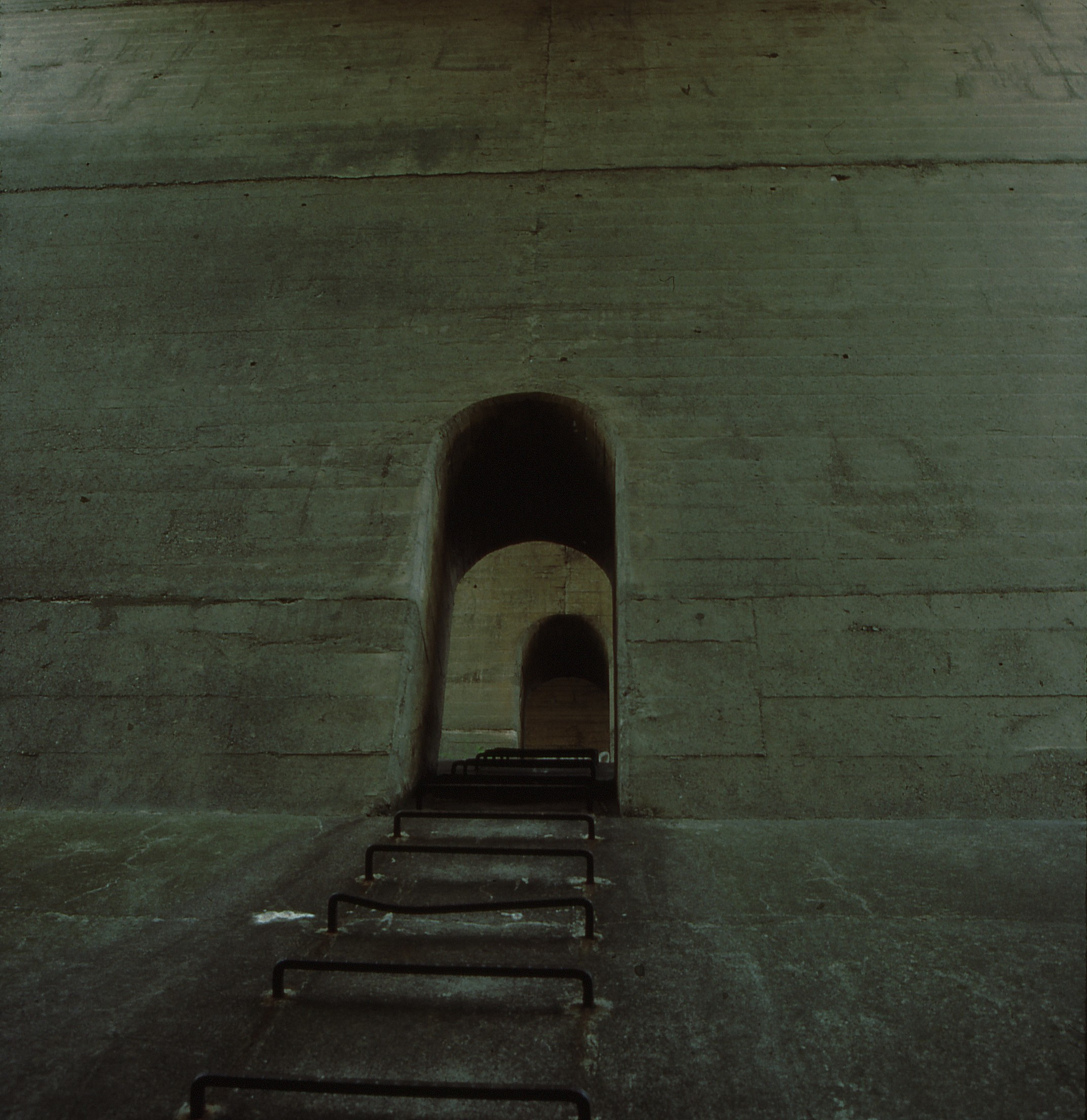
The viaduct's inspection crawlway travels over the bridge's arches.

The viaduct was built by the Delaware, Lackawanna and Western Railroad as part of the Lackawanna Cut-Off, a project that replaced an older route with a straighter and flatter route through the mountains of northwestern New Jersey. (A sister bridge of similar design but smaller dimension, the Delaware River Viaduct, carries the Lackawanna Cut-Off over the river, Interstate 80, and the New Jersey-Pennsylvania state line.) Designed by the DL&W's engineering staff under the supervision of chief engineer Lincoln Bush and built by the Philadelphia contracting firm of Reiter, Curtis & Hill, the bridge was considered a pioneering work that opened the door to the building of even larger concrete viaducts by the Lackawanna, most notably the Tunkhannock Viaduct in Pennsylvania in 1915.

Opened to regular rail traffic on Christmas Eve 1911, the Paulinskill Viaduct, supported by its seven graceful arches, carried DL&W trains until 1960, when the railroad merged with the Erie Railroad to form the Erie Lackawanna Railroad. The E-L in turn operated the Cut-Off until 1976 when the railroad was conveyed into Conrail, which ran trains until November 1978, abandoned the line in November 1981, and removed the tracks in 1984.

NJ Transit Rail Operations is working to restore commuter service along the Cut-Off, with the 7.3-mile (11.7 km) section from Lake Hopatcong, New Jersey, to Andover, New Jersey, which is slated to open in 2027. Amtrak has proposed to restore the rest of the Cut-Off west of Andover, including the Paulinskill Viaduct, and resume passenger service into northeastern Pennsylvania and on to Scranton.

The Paulinskill Viaduct is known for the internal chambers used to inspect the structural integrity of the bridge, which are popular among urban explorers. The graffiti-filled chambers have been featured by Weird NJ.
