= MLW RSC-24 =

Type and origin
- Power type: Diesel-electric
- Builder: Montreal Locomotive Works
- Serial number: 82589–82592
- Model: RSC-24, Specification DL-814
- Build date: March to April 1959
- Total produced: 4
Specifications
- Configuration
  - AAR: A1A-A1A
  - UIC: A1A'A1A'
- Gauge: 4 ft 8 1/2 in (1,435 mm) standard gauge
- Prime mover: ALCO 12-244
- Engine type: V12 Four-stroke diesel
- Displacement: 8,016 cu in (131.36 L)
- Generator: DC generator
- Traction motors: DC traction motors
- Cylinders: 12
- Cylinder size: 9 in × 10.5 in (229 mm × 267 mm)
- Transmission: Electric
Performance figures
- Power output: 1,400 hp (1,040 kW)
Career
- Operators: Canadian National Railway
- Class: MR-14a
- Numbers: 1800–1803
- Retired: Mid-1970s
- Disposition: All scrapped

The MLW RSC-24 was a type of diesel-electric locomotive built by Montreal Locomotive Works for use on the Canadian National Railway (CN).

Only four RSC-24s were built – all in 1959. They were numbered 1800–1803 by CN. The locomotives were conceived by MLW as a way to use the 12-cylinder 244 diesel engines removed from MLW FPA-2s that were receiving the more-capable Alco 251 engine (making them similar to the MLW FPA-4 locomotive).

CN used these unique units to replace 2-6-0 or 4-6-0 steam locomotives on light-rail branch lines in eastern Canada. MLW designed the locomotives to use a switcher frame, resulting in the "squashed" appearance of a road switcher. This was largely the result of a very short rear hood housing the electrical cabinet, whereas they were located in the long hood on most road switcher designs.

To make the locomotives suitable for weight-restricted light rail branch lines, MLW spread the weight over the rail surface using A1A-A1A trucks (3 axle trucks, with the center axle of each truck unpowered) that had been manufactured by Dominion Foundries and Steel (DOFASCO); this same truck was also adopted for the MLW RSC-13. Less weight on the powered axles resulted in less traction, hence the need to de-rate the engine horsepower to 1,400 hp (1,040 kW) to preclude wheel slippage.

In May 1969, 1802 was wrecked in a head-on collision at Pointe-à-la-Garde, Quebec. The remaining three units found their way to the South Shore of Nova Scotia toward the end of their career by the late 1960s, and their domain extended throughout CN's former Halifax and Southwestern Railway system.

The troublesome model 244 diesel engine plagued the units throughout their lifespan, and they were retired in the mid-1970s when CN also scrapped its MLW RSC-13 fleet; the A1A trucks of the RSC-13 and RSC-24 fleets were used by CN to re-truck several dozen MLW RS-18s to become MLW RSC-14s.

== See also ==
- List of MLW diesel locomotives
