= MLW RSC-13 =

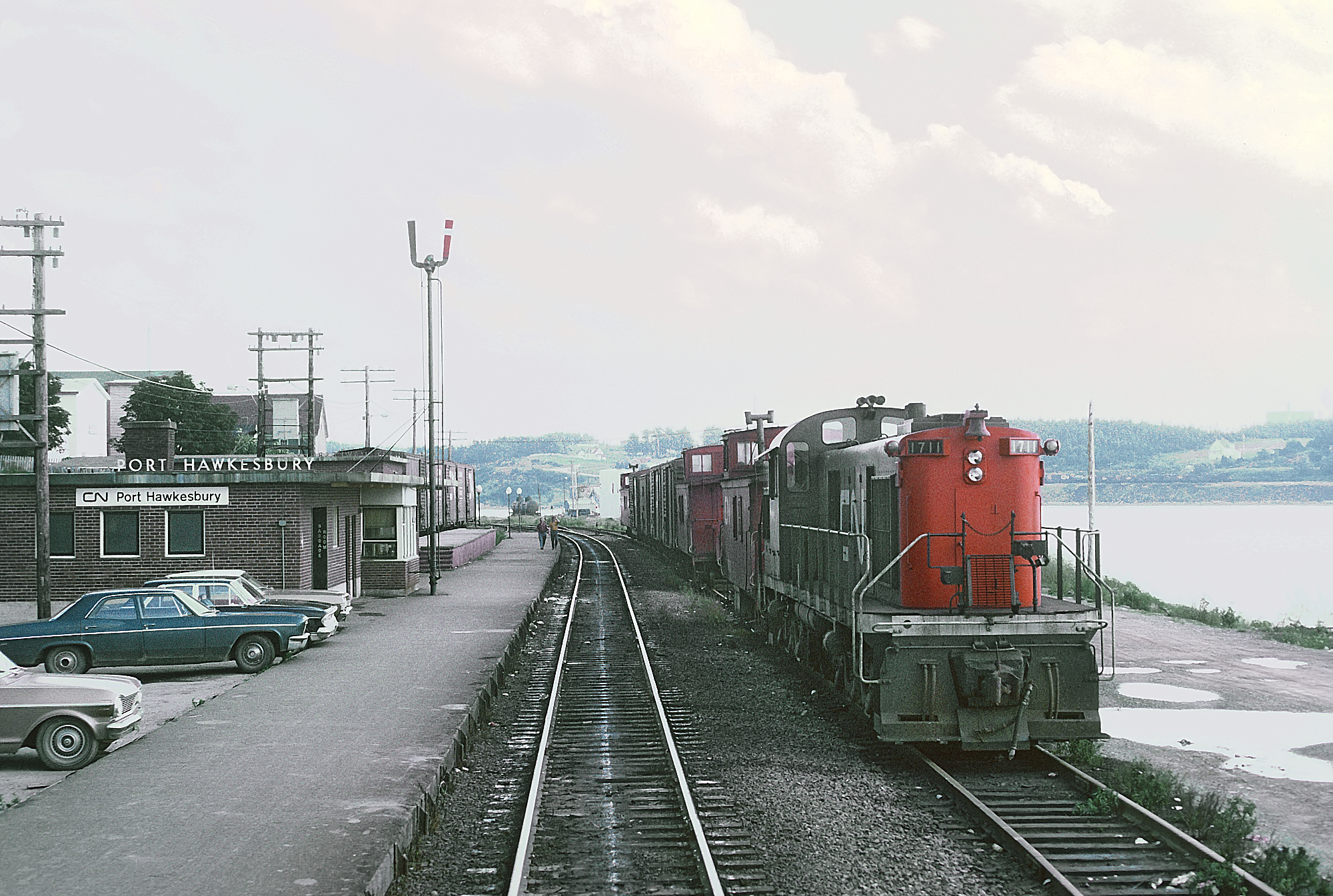
- CN RSC13 1711 with a way freight at Port Hawkesbury, Nova Scotia on September 6, 1970
Type and origin
- Power type: Diesel-electric
- Builder: Montreal Locomotive Works
- Model: RSC-13
- Build date: June 1955 to November 1957
- Total produced: 35
Specifications
- Configuration
  - AAR: A1A-A1A
  - UIC: (A1A)(A1A)
- Gauge: 4 ft 8 1/2 in (1,435 mm)
- Length: 55 ft 6 in (16.92 m)
- Height: 15 ft 4 in (4.67 m) (top of cab)
- Prime mover: 6-cylinder ALCO 6-539T
- Engine type: diesel
- Generator: DC generator
- Traction motors: DC traction motors
- Cylinder size: 9 in × 10 1/2 in (229 mm × 267 mm)
- Transmission: Electric
Performance figures
- Power output: 1,000 hp (750 kW)
Career
- Operators: Canadian National Railway
- Class: MR-10a
- Numbers: 1700–1734
- Retired: Mid-1970s
- Disposition: All scrapped

The MLW RSC-13 was a type of diesel-electric locomotive built by Montreal Locomotive Works for use on Canadian National Railway (CN).

Only thirty five RSC-13's were built — between 1955 and 1957 — and were numbered 1700–1734 by CN. The locomotives were conceived by MLW to meet CN's specification for light weight branch lines.

The model 539T diesel engine used in the RSC-13 program saw their horsepower rated at 1,000 hp (750 kW). In order to make the locomotive suitable for weight restricted light rail branch lines, MLW spread the weight over the rail surface using A1A-A1A trucks (2 powered axles, 1 unpowered axle) which were manufactured by Dominion Foundries and Steel (DOFASCO); this same truck was also adopted for the MLW RSC-24.

The RSC-13 was a one-of-a-kind diesel locomotive design and CN used these unique units to replace steam locomotives on light rail branch lines. By the 1960s they were primarily used in eastern Canada and by the early 1970s they were concentrated in the Maritimes.

The locomotives were retired by CN in the mid-1970s when CN also scrapped its MLW RSC-24 fleet; the A1A trucks of the RSC-13 and RSC-24 fleets were used by CN to re-truck several dozen MLW RS-18s to become MLW RSC-14s.

== See also ==
- List of MLW diesel locomotives
