= MLW RSC-14 =

Diesel-electric locomotive

Type and origin
- Power type: Diesel-electric
- Builder: Montreal Locomotive Works
- Rebuilder: Canadian National Railway
- Rebuild date: 1975–1976
- Number rebuilt: 38
Specifications
- Configuration
  - AAR: A1A-A1A
  - UIC: (A1A)(A1A)
- Gauge: 4 ft 8 1/2 in (1,435 mm) standard gauge
- Adhesive weight: 160,000 lb (73,000 kg; 73 t)
- Loco weight: 240,000 lb (110,000 kg; 110 t)
- Prime mover: ALCO 12-251B
- RPM range: 1000 (max)
- Engine type: V12 Four-stroke diesel
- Displacement: 8,016 cu in (131.36 L)
- Generator: DC generator
- Traction motors: 4 DC traction motors
- Cylinders: 12
- Cylinder size: 9 in × 10.5 in (229 mm × 267 mm)
- Transmission: Electric
Performance figures
- Maximum speed: 65 mph (105 km/h)
- Power output: 1,400 hp (1,040 kW)
- Tractive effort: Continuous: 30,000 lbf (133.4 kN)
Career
- Operators: Canadian National Railways
- Class: MR-14b and MR-14c
- Numbers: 1750–1787
- Disposition: Two preserved, remainder scrapped

The MLW RSC-14 was a diesel-electric locomotive rebuilt by Canadian National Railway from locomotives originally supplied by Montreal Locomotive Works.

These locomotives began life as MLW RS-18s for the Canadian National Railway (CN). The base RS-18 model was derived by MLW from the ALCO-produced RS-11 model, and was equipped with a 12-cylinder four-cycle model 251B diesel engine rated at 1,800 horsepower (1,300 kW). This engine turned a General Electric (of Peterborough, Ontario) DC generator feeding four traction motors - one per axle on two bogies. Many RS-18s were equipped with so-called "light" trucks (made by Dofasco and others) in deference to light rail on Canadian branchlines. RS-18s were owned by Canadian Pacific as well as Canadian National and many other Canadian railways, and continued in service on major railroads into the 1990s. They continue in branchline and secondary service throughout North America today (April 2009).

Using the RS-18 as a starting point, the RSC-14 was created in the mid-1970s to meet CN's requirement for A1A-A1A trucked locomotives for light rural branchline service, particularly in the Maritimes.

CN retired its older A1A-A1A configured MLW RSC-13 and MLW RSC-24 models in the mid-1970s and rebuilt several dozen RS-18s using the A1A trucks from the scrapped RSC-13 and RSC-24 units. The horsepower rating for the locomotives was lowered from 1,800 hp (1,340 kW) on the RS-18 to 1,400 hp (1,040 kW), thus the new designation "RSC-14".

The locomotives saw extensive use on Prince Edward Island (see Prince Edward Island Railway), and on branch lines in New Brunswick and Nova Scotia. Most were retired or sold by the mid-1990s.

There are only two of these locomotives left in Canada:

- CN 1754 at the Salem & Hillsborough Railroad
- CN 1762 at the former train station in Kensington, Prince Edward Island

== See also ==
- List of MLW diesel locomotives
