= Canadian National class I-8 4-6-0 =

Canadian National class I-8
Type and origin
- Power type: Steam
- Build date: 1906–1908
- Total produced: 40
Specifications
- Configuration
  - Whyte: 4-6-0
  - UIC: 2'C
- Gauge: 4 ft 8 1/2 in (1,435 mm)
- Driver dia.: 73 in (1,854 mm)
- Boiler pressure: 175 lbf/in^{2} (12.3 kg/cm^{2})
- Cylinders: Two
- Cylinder size: 21 in × 26 in (533 mm × 660 mm)
Performance figures
- Tractive effort: 23,000 lbf (102.3 kN)
Career
- Retired: 1945
- Disposition: All Scrapped

Canadian National Railway (CN) Class I-8 steam locomotives were of 4-6-0 wheel arrangement in the Whyte notation, or " 2'C " in UIC classification. These locomotives were built for the Grand Trunk Railway (GT) from 1906 through 1908 for passenger service. Most were scrapped in the 1930s, but number 1620 remained operational through World War II.

Builder	Works numbers	Dates	CN numbers	GT numbers	Notes
MLW	39538-39547	1906	1589-1598	400-409	
ALCO	40623-40632	1906	1599-1608	410-419	
GT shops	1480-1489	1907	1609-1618	420-429	
Baldwin	32774-32777; 32799; 32803; 32808-32811	1908	1619-1628	430-439	
