= ALCO RS-11 =

1,800 hp road-switcher diesel-electric locomotive

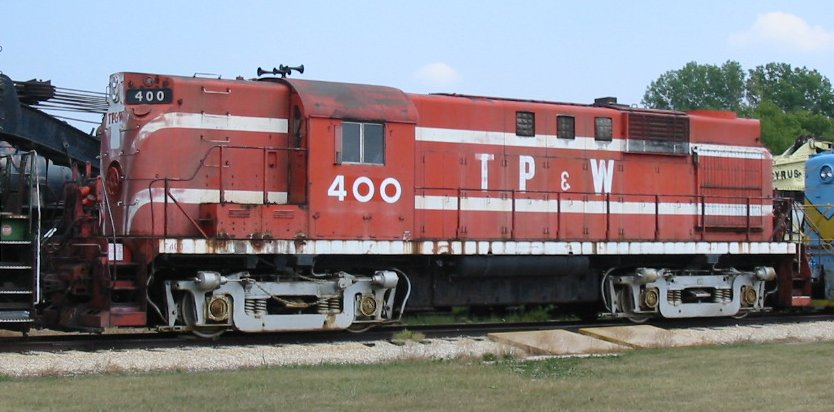
- TPW 400, an RS-11 on display at Illinois Railway Museum, July 16, 2005.
Type and origin
- Power type: Diesel-electric
- Builder: ALCO, MLW
- Model: RS-11
- Build date: February 1956 to June 1961 (Alco); November 1957 to April 1964 (MLW)
- Total produced: 433
Specifications
- Configuration
  - AAR: B-B
- Gauge: 4 ft 8 1/2 in (1,435 mm) standard gauge
- Trucks: AAR type B
- Wheel diameter: 40 in (1,016 mm)
- Minimum curve: 21° (274.37 ft or 83.63 m)
- Wheelbase: 39 ft 4 in (11.99 m)
- Length: 56 ft 6 in (17.22 m)
- Width: 10 ft 1 5/8 in (3.089 m)
- Height: 14 ft 5 1/8 in (4.397 m)
- Loco weight: 257,300 lb (116,700 kg)
- Fuel capacity: 2,000 US gal (7,600 L; 1,700 imp gal)
- Prime mover: ALCO 12-251B
- RPM range: 1,000 rpm max.
- Engine type: V12 Four stroke diesel
- Aspiration: Turbocharger
- Generator: GE GT 581
- Traction motors: (4) GE 752
- Cylinders: 12
- Cylinder size: 9 in × 10.5 in (229 mm × 267 mm)
Performance figures
- Maximum speed: 70–85 mph (113–137 km/h)
- Power output: 1,800 hp (1,300 kW)
- Tractive effort: 64,325 lb (29,177 kg)
Career
- Locale: North America South America

The ALCO RS-11 is a class of diesel-electric locomotive rated at 1,800 hp (1.34 MW), that rode on two-axle trucks, having a B-B wheel arrangement. This model was built by both Alco (327 units) and Montreal Locomotive Works (99 units). Total production was 433 units.

== Development ==
The first three RS-11s were produced by ALCO in February 1956 as a demonstrator set. This locomotive, classified by ALCO as model DL-701, was their first high-horsepower road switcher, intended to be a replacement for the very popular RS-3 road switcher. Featuring a V-12, 1,800 hp (1,300 kW) 251B diesel engine, the RS-11 was ALCO's answer to EMD's very successful GP9. The turbocharged RS-11 accelerated faster, had a higher tractive effort rating and typically used less fuel than the competition. It was also quite versatile and could be found in heavy haul freight as well as passenger service. It was produced in high-nose and low-nose versions. Montreal Locomotive Works also built 351 nearly identical units, known as the RS-18, for the Canadian market.

While the RS-11 benefited from the increased power and reliability offered with ALCO's new 251B engine, and was arguably a more advanced product than the GP9, its market acceptance was disappointing against the reputation EMD's locomotives had made for superior reliability.

== Original purchasers ==
Owner	Image	Quantity	Numbers	Notes
	Alco	3	701, 701A, 701B	
	Carolina and Northwestern Railway	1	11	to Chicago and Northwestern Railway 4651, later renumbered to 4251
	Chicago and Northwestern Railway	2	1613, 1624	RS-3s rebuilt by Alco in March 1960 as RS-11 with a 251-B engine but retained RS-3 high short hood.
	Delaware and Hudson	12	5000-5011	
	Duluth, Winnipeg and Pacific	15	3600-3614	
	Erie Mining	15	300-314	
	Ferrocarril del Pacifico	1	1501	Later renumbered to 501, wrecked and retired in 2006.
	Ferrocarriles Nacionales de México	94	7200-7293	
	Green Bay and Western	1	309	
	Lehigh Valley Railroad	4	400-403	
	Maine Central	1	801	
	Ministry of Communication and Transportation (Mexico)	4	7123-1 - 7123-4	
	Missouri Pacific	12	4601-4612	
	Monongahela Connecting Railroad	1	700	
	New York, New Haven and Hartford	15	1400-1414	
	New York Central	9	8000-8008	
	New York, Chicago and St. Louis Railroad	35	558-577, 850-864	
	Norfolk and Western	99	308-406	
	Northern Pacific	18	900-917	
	Pennsylvania	38	8617-8654	
	Portland Terminal	1	1082	to Maine Central 802
	Seaboard Air Line	10	100-109	to Seaboard Coast Line 1202-1211, later transferred to Louisville and Nashville 950-959
	Southern Peru Copper Corp.	5	3-6, 8	
	Southern Pacific Railroad	34	5723-5729, 5845-5871	
	Toledo, Peoria and Western Railway	3	400-402	
	Total	433		

== Accidents and incidents ==
- On September 13, 1963, Southern Pacific 5857 struck a flatbed truck at a crossing northwest of Gonzales, California. The truck was being used as a makeshift bus and was carrying 58 migrant farmworkers on a return trip after a ten-hour work shift in Salinas. 32 were killed and 25 were injured. The National Safety Council ranked the crash as the deadliest automobile accident in the history of the United States.

== Preservation ==
- Duluth, Winnipeg and Pacific 3612 is preserved as York-Durham Heritage Railway 3612 at the York–Durham Heritage Railway in Ontario
- Ferrocarriles Nacionales de México 7282 is preserved at the Yucatán RR Museum in Mérida, Yucatán.
- New York, New Haven and Hartford 1402 is preserved at the Danbury Railway Museum in Danbury, Connecticut
- Toledo, Peoria and Western 400 is preserved at the Illinois Railway Museum in Union, Illinois

== See also ==
- List of ALCO diesel locomotives
- List of MLW diesel locomotives
