= ALCO S-1 and S-3 =

Diesel-electric switcher locomotives

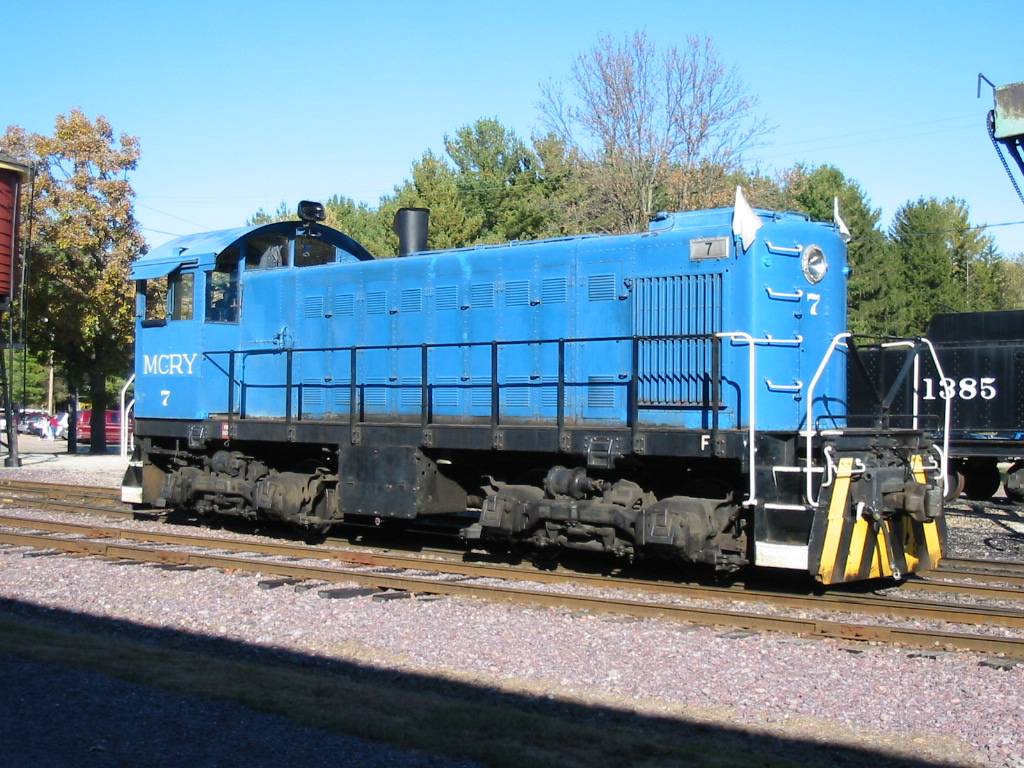
- Mid-Continent Railway No. 7, an S-1, rests between trains on October 10, 2004
Type and origin
- Power type: Diesel
- Builder: American Locomotive Company; Montreal Locomotive Works
- Build date: April 1940–June 1950 (S-1); February 1950–November 1953 (S-3)
- Total produced: 543 (S-1); 300 (S-3)
Specifications
- Configuration
  - AAR: B-B
  - UIC: Bo'Bo'
  - Commonwealth: Bo-Bo
- Gauge: 4 ft 8 1/2 in (1,435 mm) standard gauge
- Trucks: Blunt (S-1); AAR type A (S-3)
- Wheel diameter: 40 in (1,016 mm)
- Minimum curve: 50° (118.31 ft or 36.06 m)
- Wheelbase: 30 ft (9.14 m)
- Length: 45 ft (13.72 m)
- Width: 10 ft 2 1/2 in (3.112 m)
- Height: 14 ft 4 3/8 in (4.378 m)
- Loco weight: 199,000 lb (90,000 kg)
- Fuel capacity: 635 US gal (2,400 L; 529 imp gal)
- Prime mover: ALCO 6-539
- Engine type: Four-stroke diesel
- Aspiration: Natural
- Displacement: 9,572 cu in (156.86 L)
- Generator: GE GT 552-A
- Traction motors: 4 × GE 731
- Cylinders: Straight 6
- Cylinder size: 12 1/2 in × 13 in (318 mm × 330 mm)
Performance figures
- Power output: 660 hp (490 kW)
- Tractive effort: 49,790 lb (22,580 kg)
Career
- Locale: North America, Brazil, United Kingdom

The ALCO S-1 and S-3 are 660 horsepower (490 kW) diesel-electric switcher locomotives produced by ALCO and their Canadian subsidiary Montreal Locomotive Works (MLW). The two locomotives differed only in trucks, with the S-1 using ALCO's own Blunt trucks, and the S-3 using AAR type A switcher trucks. The S-1 was built between April 1940 and June 1950, with a total of 543 completed, while the S-3 was constructed between February 1950 and November 1953 (MLW until 1957) with total sales of 300. A modified version, the S-10, was built by MLW only; 13 were built between January and June 1958.

== Identification ==
The S-1 and S-3 are distinguishable externally from the very similar S-2 and S-4 1,000 horsepower (750 kW) switchers in that they have a smaller exhaust stack with a round base and a smaller radiator shutter area on the nose sides. The S-1/S-3 radiator shutter area is taller than it is wide, while the S-2/S-4 radiator area is wider. The smaller stack is due to the lack of turbocharging.

The S-10 is not externally distinguishable from later Canadian-built S-3 locomotives; it differed mostly in electrical equipment.

== Original owners ==
The S-1 and S-3 models were sold to an extensive list of railroads and industrial operators, as detailed below. Major owners of the S-1 included the New York Central Railroad (NYC), with 71 locomotives; the New Haven with 65 locomotives; the L&N with 45 locomotives; the C&NW, with 29 locomotives; and the Pennsylvania Railroad (PRR) with 27 locomotives. Major customers for the S-3 included the CP, with 101; the CN, with 49; the NYC, with 43 locomotives; the B&M, with 16; and the PRR, with 13. The MLW S-10 was sold only to the CP.

The totals below include export orders and MLW-built locomotives.

=== S-1 ===
ALCO constructed approximately 535 S-1s for the US market between 1940 and 1950.

Image	Railroad	Quantity	Road numbers
	Alabama Great Southern Railroad	2	6501–6502
	Alameda Belt Line	3	D-1–D-3
	Alco (demonstrator)	1	660
	Alco (plant switcher)	1	5
	Alco/War Department	1	GT-1304
	American Steel & Wire	1	2
	Ann Arbor Railroad	2	2–3
	ARMCO Steel	3	E106–E108
	Atchison, Topeka and Santa Fe Railway	2	2303–2304
	Baltimore and Ohio Railroad	6	223–227, 250
	Belt Railway of Chicago	3	304–306
	Birmingham Southern Railroad	2	100, 101
	Boston and Maine Railroad	10	1163–1172
	Broward County Port Authority	1	410
	Canadian Car and Munitions	1	5
	Estrada de Ferro Central do Brasil	5	3001–3005
	Central of Georgia Railway	2	4, 6
	Central Railroad of New Jersey	2	1024, 1025
	Champlain Paper and Fibre	1	25
	Chicago and Eastern Illinois Railroad	3	103–105
	Chicago and North Western Railway	29	1202–1205, 1213, 1223–1229, 1232–1236, 1247–1258
	Chicago Great Western Railway	5	11–15
	Chicago, St. Paul, Minneapolis and Omaha Railway	3	56, 57, 69
	Cincinnati, New Orleans and Texas Pacific Railway	2	6000–6001
	City of Prineville Railway	1	101
	Donner Hanna Coal Company	1	2
	Day and Zimmerman (Iowa Army Ammunition Depot)	1	3-100
	Defense Plant Corporation	2	DPC25.23, DPC25.24
	Delray Connecting Railroad	4	66, 68, 70, 72
	Des Moines Union Railway	4	1–4
	Detroit and Mackinac Railway	1	646
	East St. Louis Junction Railroad	1	100
	Elgin, Joliet and Eastern Railway	5	213–217
	Erie Railroad	16	306–321
	Ford Motor Company	4	6601–6604
	Great Lakes Steel Corporation	1	32
	Green Bay and Western Railroad	1	102
	Gulf, Mobile and Ohio Railroad	4	661–664
	Hunken Conkey Construction	2	1001–1002
	Inland Steel	7	53, 56, 61, 62, 64–66
	Inland Waterways Corporation	1	1
	Iowa Transfer Railroad	1	2
	John Morrell & Co.	1	7
	Kansas City Terminal Railway	5	40–44
	Kewaunee, Green Bay and Western Railroad	1	103
	Lehigh Valley Railroad	1	117
	Long Island Rail Road	14	404–408, 413–420, 421
	Louisville and Nashville Railroad	45	16–29, 34–68
	Maine Central Railroad	8	953–960
	Massena Terminal Railroad	2	8, 9
	Minnesota Transfer Railway	5	60–64
	Missouri Pacific Railroad	2	9007, 9008
	Nashville, Chattanooga and St. Louis Railway	4	1–4
	Ferrocarriles Nacionales de México	5	5000-5004
	Newburgh and South Shore Railway	7	3–7, 9, 10
	New Orleans and Lower Coast Railroad	3	9013-9015
	New York, New Haven and Hartford Railroad	65	0931–0995
	New Jersey, Indiana and Illinois Railroad	1	1
	New York Central Railroad	71	590, 685–744, 864–873
	New York, Chicago and St. Louis Railroad	1	85
	Northern Pacific Railway	1	131
	Northern Pacific Terminal	5	30–34
	Pennsylvania Railroad	27	5661–5670, 5954–5956, 9100–9103, 9237–9246
	Point Comfort and Northern Railway	1	5
	Port Huron and Detroit Railroad	2	51, 52
	Portland Terminal Company	4	1005-1008
	Procter & Gamble	1	9
	Pullman Railroad	2	20, 21
	Reading Company	5	50-54
	Red River Ordnance Depot	1	7372
	Republic Steel	9	15–17, 312–314, D840, D841, D810
	River Terminal Railway	1	52
	St. Louis and O'Fallon Railway	1	51
	Seaboard Air Line	1	1201
	Sheffield Steel Corporation	3	11–13
	Solvay Processing Division, Allied Chemical	3	1–3
	South Buffalo Railway	4	51, 52, 60, 61
	Southern Pacific Company	4	1017–1020
	Southern Railway	3	2000, 2001, 2006
	South Omaha Terminal Railway	5	1–5
	Spokane, Portland and Seattle Railway	2	10, 11, 10 Sold to City of Prineville 102, 11 to Burlington Northern 11
	Steel Company of Wales (UK)	5	801–805
	Studebaker	2	2, 3
	Tennessee Central Railway	1	51
	Tennessee Coal, Iron and Railroad Company	3	700–702
	Tennessee Copper	2	104, 105
	Terminal Railroad Association of St. Louis	4	521–524
	Texas and New Orleans Railroad	1	10
	Texaco	1	19
	Texas City Terminal Railway	2	30, 31
	Texas Pacific-Missouri Pacific Terminal Railroad of New Orleans	2	3, 4
	Timken Rolling Bearing Company	2	5911, 5912
	Toledo, Angola and Western Railway	1	101
	Traux Truer Coal	1	10
	Union Railroad	4	451–454
	Upper Merion and Plymouth Railroad	1	54
	U.S. Army	11	7132-7136, 7141-7142, 7374-7375, 7459-7460
	Wabash Railroad	9	151–159
	Weirton Steel	3	200, 203, 204
	Western Maryland Railway	1	102
	Western Pacific Railroad	8	504–511
	Youngstown Sheet and Tube	5	661–665
	Total	543	

=== S-3 ===
ALCO and the Montreal Locomotive Works constructed approximately 300 S-3s for the North American market between 1950 and 1957.

Image	Railroad	Quantity	Road numbers
Manufactured by ALCO
	Aluminum Company of America	1	8
	Ann Arbor Railroad	4	4–7
	Boston and Maine Railroad	16	1173–1188
	Brooks and Scanlon	2	101, 102
	Champion Paper	1	2104
	Chicago and North Western Railway	6	1262–1267
	Davenport, Rock Island and North Western Railway	7	1–7
	Davidson Chemical Division, W.R. Grace and Company	1	101
	El Dorado and Wesson Railway	1	18
	Ford Motor Company	7	6605–6611
	Frederick Snare Corporation	1	7
	General Portland Cement	1	1
	Graysonia, Nashville and Ashdown Railroad	1	51
	Greater Portland Public Development Corporation	1	661
	Humble Oil	1	997
	Louisville and Nashville Railroad	7	69–75
	Maine Central Railroad	2	961, 962
	Manistique and Lake Superior Railroad	1	1
	Mount Hood Railroad	1	50
	New York Central Railroad	43	874–916
	Pennsylvania Railroad	13	8873–8885
	Solvay Processing Division, Allied Chemical and Dye Corporation	1	2
	Southern Pacific Company	10	1023–1032
	Swift and Company	1	664
	Texas and Northern Railway	2	3, 4
	Texas City Terminal Railway	1	32
	Texaco	2	21, 22
	Washington, Idaho and Montana Railway	1	30
	West Pittston and Exeter Railway	1	6
	ALCO total	137	
Manufactured by MLW
	Bathhurst Power and Paper	1	3
	Canadian Arsenals	1	1
	Canadian National Railway	49	8450–8498
	Canadian Pacific Railway	101	6500–6600
	Essex Terminal Railway	1	103
	LaSalle Coke	1	4
	National Harbours Board	8	D2–D9
	Price Brothers	1	106
	MLW subtotal	163	
	Total	300	

=== S-10 ===
MLW constructed 13 S-10s in 1958, all for the Canadian Pacific Railway, numbered 6601–6613. These units were essentially similar to late-built S3s, though with minor updates to the electrical gear.

=== S-11 ===
In 1959, MLW built a final order of 660 horsepower switchers for the Canadian Pacific, as model S-11, numbered 6614–6623. The internal machinery of these units was essentially the same as that of the S-10, but the car body was radically redesigned, with the radiator on the front end of the hood instead of on the sides.

== Preservation ==
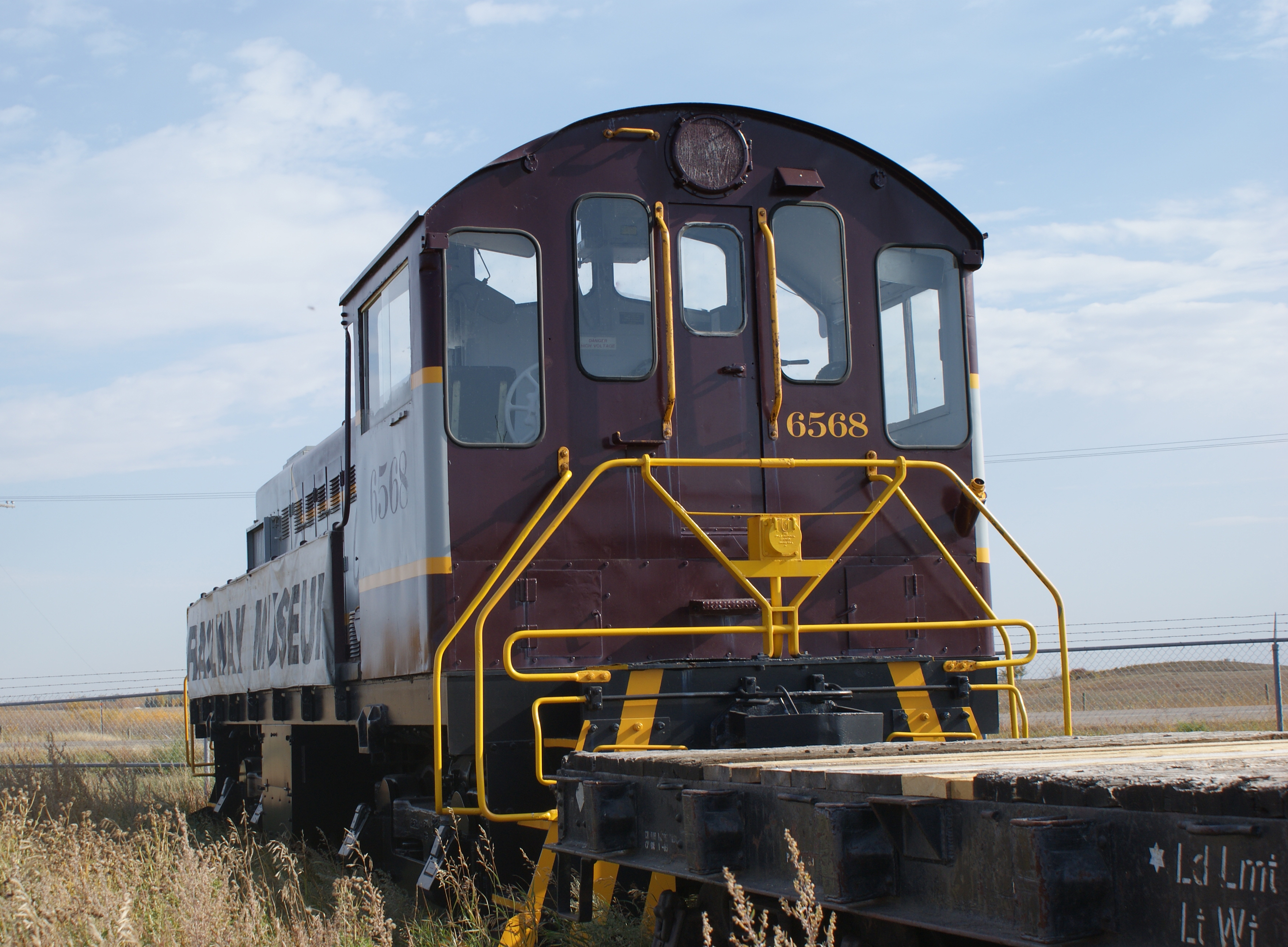
Ex-Canadian Pacific MLW S-3 No. 6568 on display at the Saskatchewan Railway Museum

Numerous S-1 and S-3 locomotives remain in use, and several are preserved:

- Ex-U.S. Army S-1 No. 7372 is at the Western Pacific Railroad Museum and painted in Western Pacific colors.
- Ex-Canadian Pacific MLW S-3 No. 6568 is at the Saskatchewan Railway Museum.
- One Ex-Steel Company of Wales S-1 No. 801 is preserved and is being restored to working order at the Nene Valley Railway in England.
- Ex-Erie Railroad S-1 No. 307 is preserved at Riverside Park, Manhattan and painted in New York Central colors.
- Ex-Erie Railroad S-1 No. 308 is preserved at the New York and Lake Erie Railroad
- Ex-Tennessee Central No. 51, later Cadiz Railroad No. 8, was on display in Trigg County, KY near exit 65 of Interstate 24. The unit is now currently in private ownership in nearby Christian County.
- Ex-New York Central No. 872, later Bath and Hammondsport No. 5, was acquired by the Rochester & Genesee Valley Railroad Museum in March 2025.
- Ex-South Omaha Terminal No. 1, later Hutchinson Northern Railroad No. 4, is owned by the Abilene and Smokey Valley Railroad. Number 4 was donated in 1993 and still runs excursions.

== See also ==
- List of ALCO diesel locomotives
- List of MLW diesel locomotives
