= Port Huron and Detroit Railroad =

Overview
- Headquarters: Port Huron, Michigan
- Dates of operation: 1917–1984
- Predecessor: Port Huron & Southern Railroad
- Successor: Chessie System

Technical
- Track gauge: 4 ft 8 1/2 in (1,435 mm)
- Length: 14 mi (23 km)

Port Huron & Detroit Railroad Company was incorporated on September 1, 1917, in the State of Michigan, United States of America, to own and operate 14 miles (23 km) of railroad track along the Saint Clair River from Port Huron, Michigan, to Marine City, Michigan. It remained in business until it was sold to the Chesapeake and Ohio Railway (then part of Chessie System) in December 1984. Most of its original trackage is still being operated today by CSX Transportation Co. with whom Chesapeake and Ohio Railway merged into on September 2, 1987.

== History ==
In 1901, the predecessor railroad to the Port Huron & Detroit Railroad, the Port Huron & Southern Railroad Company, was formed to own 3 miles (4.8 km) of trackage from Port Huron, Michigan, south to Marysville to serve a salt plant located there. Plans to extend this line south approximately 60 miles (97 km) to Detroit resulted in the creation of the Port Huron & Detroit Railroad in 1917. Expansion of the railroad south through St. Clair and terminating at Marine City, 19.1 miles (30.7 km) from Port Huron, was completed in 1918. The Port Huron & Detroit Railroad went into receivership in 1922 where it was purchased by James E. Duffy (1902-1981), whose family owned and operated the Port Huron & Detroit Railroad until it was sold to Chesapeake and Ohio Railway in 1984.

== Customers ==
The major industries located on the Port Huron & Detroit Railroad early in its history was the Marysville Power Plant, Pressed Metals, The St. Clair Rubber Company, Wills Sainte Clair Inc. (an automotive manufacturer), Diamond Crystal Salt, McLouth Shipyard and Independent Sugar Company. In 1930, the unused spur track to the sugar beet plant in Marine City became the connection with the seven-mile Algonac Transit Company, an industrial railroad created at that time by the boat manufacturer Chris Craft in order to have a rail connection to its plant in Marine City. Due to the presence of an interurban passenger line running parallel to the railroad in its early years, the Port Huron & Detroit Railroad never operated regularly scheduled passenger service.

At the end of the independent ownership of the Port Huron & Detroit Railroad in the 1980s the major industries it served were the Detroit Edison St. Clair Power Plant located just south of the City of St. Clair (receiving coal), Morton Salt in Marysville, Diamond Crystal Salt in St. Clair, a Chrysler Corporation auto parts plant in Marysville (the former Wills Sainte Clair plant) and a Dow Chemical facility.

== Operations ==
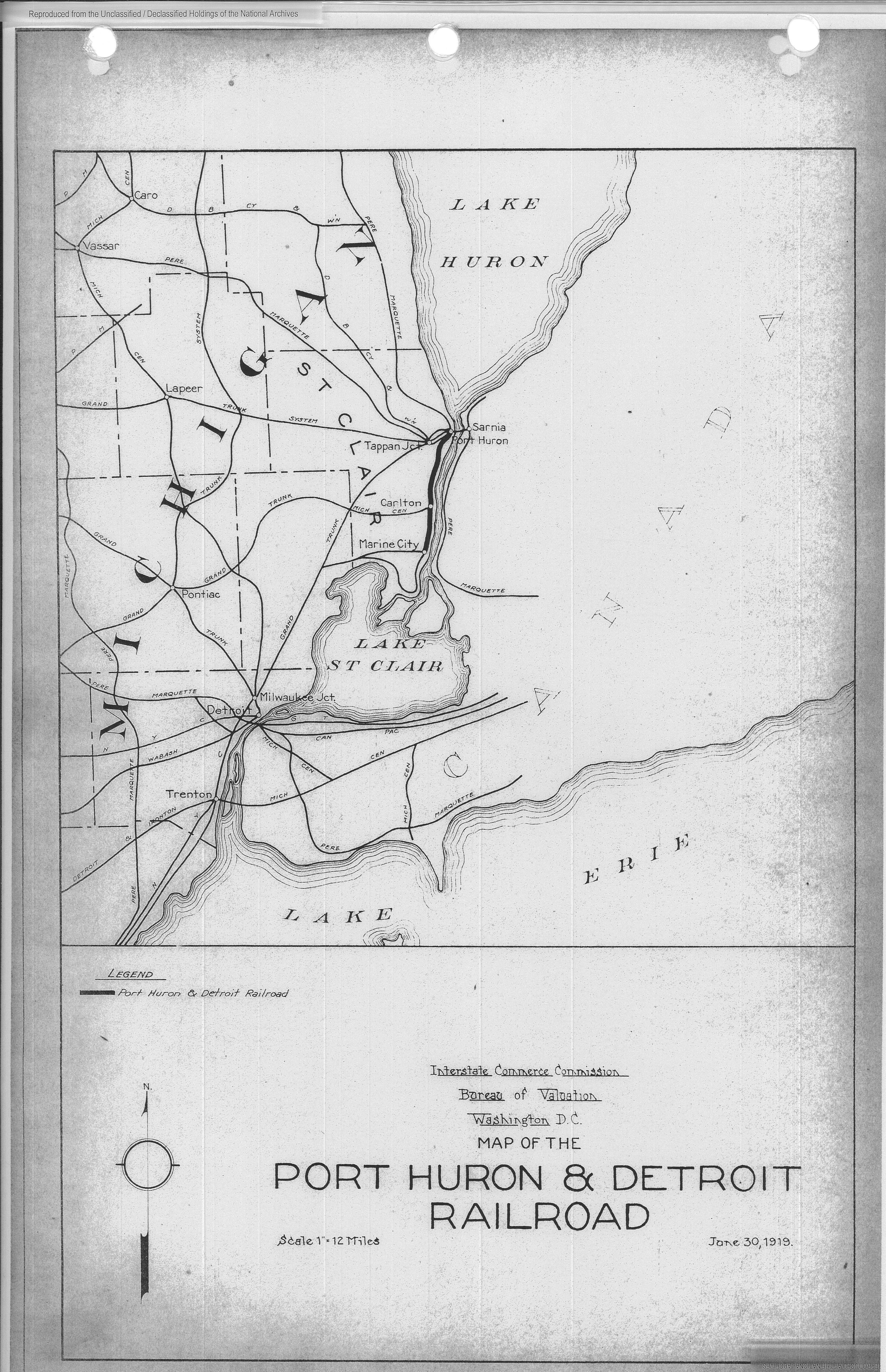
1919 map of the railroad

The trackage of the Port Huron & Detroit Railroad started at Port Huron (Milepost 0) and went through the cities of Marysville (Milepost 4.6), St. Clair (Milepost 10.8), Belle River (Milepost 15.2) and Marine City (Milepost 19.1), where it ended. Interchange of freight cars were made with both Grand Trunk Western Railway and Chesapeake and Ohio Railway at Port Huron.

In the 1980s train operations on the Port Huron & Detroit were usually two trains each weekday that ran south from Port Huron to switch the industries located between there and the City of St. Clair, with a train going all the way to Marine City a couple times a week to switch Detroit Gasket Company located there. These trains also did the interchange with the two connecting railroads at Port Huron. The Port Huron & Detroit Railroad had about 100 on-line industries at this time though many were infrequent shippers. The Port Huron & Detroit Railroad owned a freight yard in Port Huron that ran parallel to and on the south side of GTW and C&O's trackage there. The railroad's headquarters building and its locomotive repair house were located in Port Huron.

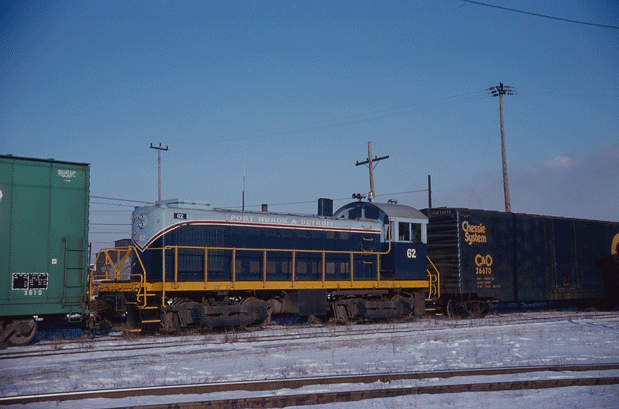
Port Huron & Detroit Railroad Locomotive Number 62 at Port Huron, Michigan January 5, 1976

== Locomotives ==
The Port Huron & Detroit Railroad's motive power consisted of 0-6-0 switcher-type steam locomotives. The company owned a total of 12 of these locomotives between 1920 and 1945. The railroad replaced its steam locomotives with two diesel electric switcher locomotives manufactured by American Locomotive Company, purchased in 1945 (model S-1 #51 and #52) and the third purchased in the early 1950s (model S-2 #60). For a few years, the railroad touted that they were the first completely dieselized railroad in Michigan. William N. Boyd, general superintendent and chief engineer of the PH&D, invented a wheel flange lubricator for these locomotives that was then adopted by other railroads. The #51 was retired and sold in the early 1950s. In the mid 1960s a used Alco switcher was added (ex-B&O model S-4 #62 built in 1956). The three diesel locomotives (#52, #60, #62) remained on the railroad until it was sold in 1984.

== Sale ==
On December 13, 1984, the Port Huron & Detroit Railroad was sold by the Duffy family, who owned it since 1922, to the Chesapeake and Ohio Railway (at that time controlled by CSX Corp.). The locomotive used on the last train, number 60, was pulled in to the Port Huron roundhouse that evening for a closing ceremony and farewell party. The sale was initiated by the 1981 death of James Duffy Jr., whose son, James Duffy III who was living in New York, chose to sell the majority stake in the company he had inherited to Chessie System; the sale was approved by the Interstate Commerce Commission in September 1984. CSX Transportation Co. still owns and operates the ex-Port Huron & Detroit Railroad trackage from Port Huron to the City of St. Clair but runs it as part of its operations and not as a separate railroad.
