= ALCO RS-1 =

Diesel-electric locomotive built by ALCO

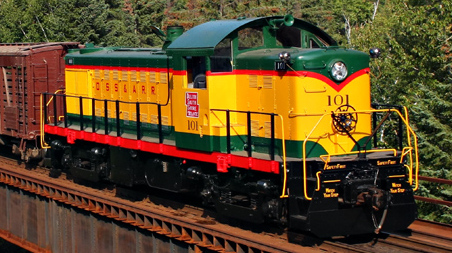
- DSSA #101 of the Lake Superior Railroad Museum near French River, Minnesota
Type and origin
- Power type: Diesel-electric
- Builder: American Locomotive Company; Montreal Locomotive Works
- Model: RS-1
- Build date: March 1941 – March 1960
- Total produced: 469
Specifications
- Configuration
  - AAR: B-B
- Gauge: 4 ft 8 1/2 in (1,435 mm) standard gauge; 5 ft 3 in (1,600 mm), Brazil
- Trucks: AAR type B
- Wheel diameter: 40 in (1,016 mm)
- Minimum curve: 57° (116.14 ft or 35.40 m)
- Wheelbase: 40 ft 5 in (12.32 m)
- Length: 55 ft 5 3/4 in (16.91 m)
- Width: 10 ft 0 in (3.05 m)
- Height: 14 ft 5 in (4.39 m)
- Loco weight: 247,500 lb (112,300 kg)
- Fuel capacity: 1,000 US gal (3,800 L; 830 imp gal)
- Prime mover: ALCO 539T
- Engine type: Inline 6, four-stroke diesel
- Aspiration: Turbocharger
- Displacement: 1,595 cu in (26.14 L) per cylinder 9,572 cu in (156.86 L) total
- Generator: GE GT-553-C DC generator
- Traction motors: 4× GE 731 DC traction motors
- Cylinders: 6
- Cylinder size: 12 1/2 in × 13 in (318 mm × 330 mm)
- Loco brake: Independent air
- Train brakes: Air
Performance figures
- Maximum speed: 65 mph (105 km/h)
- Power output: 1,000 hp (746 kW)
- Tractive effort: 40,425 lbf (179.82 kN)
Career
- Locale: North America, Brazil, Saudi Arabia

The ALCO RS-1 is a 4-axle diesel-electric locomotive built by Alco-GE between 1941 and 1953 and the American Locomotive Company from 1953 to 1960. ALCO subsidiary Montreal Locomotive Works built an additional three RS-1s in 1954. This model has the distinction of having the longest production run of any diesel locomotive for the North American market. (Note: Excluding industrial switchers such as the GE 25-ton switcher.) The RS-1 was in production for 19 years from the first unit Rock Island #748 in March 1941 to the last unit National of Mexico #5663 in March 1960.

== Design ==
In 1940, the Rock Island Railroad approached ALCO about building a road switcher locomotive, for both road and switching service. To meet the Rock Island's request, ALCO created the RS-1. Their new design was a hood unit, in contrast to most existing locomotive designs at the time which were predominantly carbody units. The hood unit design allowed for improved visibility, especially to the rear. Rear visibility is very important for switching, which often involves reverse movements. Unlike carbody units, hood units such as the RS-1 can be operated in reverse without much difficulty, eliminating the need to turn them around at the end of a line. For these reasons, most North American locomotives built since have followed this basic hood unit design.

Though the locomotive could operate in either direction, the "long" hood was officially designated as the front.

== Production ==
The first 13 production locomotives were requisitioned by the US Army, as U.S. involvement in World War II began shortly after ALCO began production. The five railroads affected had to wait while replacements were manufactured. The requisitioned RS-1s were remanufactured by ALCO into six axle RSD-1s for use on the Trans-Iranian Railway to supply the Soviet Union during the war.

=== Variants ===
RSC-1: An RS-1 with three-axle trucks, having an A1A-A1A wheel arrangement. It was used in much the same manner as the original variant, though the axle load was distributed for operation on light rail such as are found on branch lines.

RSD-1: An RS-1 with two three axle trucks instead of the normal two axle trucks. The three axle trucks allowed the locomotive to operate safely on lighter track, as its weight was more evenly distributed by the additional axles. Unlike the RSC-1, all axles were powered.

== Operating history ==
RS-1s were primarily operated in freight service, though in some cases they were also assigned to passenger trains. A few railroads equipped their RS-1s with steam heating equipment for passenger trains. Many RS-1s were stationed in train yards for switching duties, assembling and taking apart trains to be hauled by mainline locomotives. True to their designation as 'road switchers', RS-1s could also be frequently found hauling mainline trains, especially on branch lines.

The locomotive enjoyed a long service life despite ALCO's 1969 closure just nine years after the last RS-1 was built, as spare parts have been produced and marketed by other manufacturers for the RS-1 and other ALCO products. Many served for decades, and even in the 21st century a number of examples can still be found in freight service on shortline railroads, or on excursion trains at railroad museums.

== Successors ==
The RS-1 was succeeded by two improved versions in ALCO's catalogue, the RS-2 and RS-3. Despite this, the RS-1 remained in production even after both of its successors were discontinued.

== Original owners ==
=== First thirteen ===
Railroad	Quantity	Road numbers	Notes
Atlanta and St. Andrews Bay Railroad	3	901–903	to US Army 8010–8012
Chicago, Milwaukee, St. Paul and Pacific Railroad ("Milwaukee Road")	2	1678–1679	to US Army 8002–8003
Chicago, Rock Island and Pacific Railroad	4	746–749	to US Army 8004, 8007, 8005, 8006; 748 first RS-1 built in 3/41
New York, Susquehanna and Western Railroad	2	231, 233	to US Army 8000–8001
Tennessee Coal, Iron and Railroad Company	2	601–602	to US Army 8008–8009
Total	13		

=== Remainder of production ===
Railroad	Quantity	Road numbers	Notes
Akron, Canton and Youngstown Railroad	1	D-2	
Alabama, Tennessee and Northern Railway	11	101–111	To SLSF 101-111
Alaska Railroad	2	1000–1001	1000 at The Museum of Alaska Transportation and Industry
Alton Railroad	10	50–59	
Ann Arbor Railroad	2	20–21	#20 Owned By Southern Michigan Railroad Society, on loan to Shepherd, MI Railroad Depot Museum and Display; #21 Owned By Southern Michigan Railroad Society
Atchison, Topeka and Santa Fe Railway	6	2385–2388, 2394–2395	2385–2388 renumbered 2396–2399
Atlanta and St. Andrews Bay Railroad	10	904–913	904 is on display at Bay Line Railroad Headquarters.; 905 Owned By Maryland and Delaware Railroad 22, Currently By Arkansas and Missouri Railroad 22; 907 Owned By Conrad Yelvington Distributors 303; 909 Owned By Chattahoochee Industrial Railroad 3, then Conrad Yelvington Distributors 3, Currently Conrad Yelvington Distributors 275; 911 Owned By Chattahoochee Industrial Railroad 118, Currently Conrad Yelvington Distributors 294; 913 Owned By Tennessee Valley Railroad Museum H and S Railroad 913, Current owner uncertain
Atlantic and East Carolina Railway	1	500	
Bamberger Railroad	1	570	to Union Pacific 1270
Central Railroad of New Jersey	6	1200–1205	
Chesapeake and Ohio Railway	2	5114–5115	5114 last numbered Baltimore & Ohio 9185; 5115 last numbered Baltimore & Ohio 9186
Chicago and Eastern Illinois Railway	4	115–118	
Chicago and North Western Railway	6	1066–1069, 1080–1081	
Chicago and Western Indiana Railroad	12	252–263	
Chicago, Milwaukee, St. Paul and Pacific Railroad ("Milwaukee Road")	5	1676, 1677, 961–963	
Chicago, Rock Island and Pacific Railroad	11	735–745	
Duluth, South Shore and Atlantic Railway	8	100–107	to Soo Line Railroad: 101 preserved by the Lake Superior Railroad Museum; 103 and 104 sold to Algiers, Winslow and Western Railway. 103 preserved by the Indiana Railway Museum.
DuPont	4	105–108	
Gaylord Container	2	302–303	
GE-Atomic Energy Commission	4	39-3729 – 39-3732	39-3729 & 39-3731 are preserved as part of the Manhattan Project National Historical Park in Hanford, Washington
Genesee and Wyoming Railroad	2	25, 30	25 was Bay Colony Railroad 1064 Current owner unknown
Grand Trunk Western Railroad	2	1950–1951	Last RS-1s built for US Railroad 11/1957
Great Northern Railway	4	182–185	182 at the Railway Museum of British Columbia, Squamish, BC
Gulf, Mobile and Ohio Railroad	24	1102–1117, 1120–1127	
Illinois Terminal Railroad	6	750–752, 754–756	
Kansas City Southern Railway	4	1110–1113	
Lake Erie, Franklin and Clarion Railroad	2	20–21	
Lake Superior and Ishpeming Railroad	3	1001–1003	
Long Island Rail Road	9	461–469	467 privately owned, stored inoperable at Hoosier Valley Railroad Museum
Midland Continental Railroad	2	401–402	
Minneapolis and St. Louis Railway	35	244, 744, 944, 1044, 1144, 645, 745, 845, 945, 146, 246, 346, 446, 546, 646, 746, 846, 946, 1046, 547, 948, 1048, 1148, 849, 949, 1049, 1149, 1249, 950, 1050, 1150, 1250, 751, 851, 951	originally numbered by month and year of delivery, renumbered 200–234
Ferrocarriles Nacionales de México	64	5606–5663, (5619–5624 twice)	5619–5621 (first) built by Montreal Locomotive Works. NdeM 5663 was the last RS-1 built 3/1960.
New York, New Haven and Hartford Railroad	12	0660–0671	0670 currently owned by the Central New England Railroad, stored out of service due to missing parts
New York Central Railroad	14	8100–8113	renumbered 9900–9913
New York, Susquehanna and Western Railway	16	230–256 (even numbers only), 231 and 233 (second)	
Northern Pacific Railway	4	155–158	renumbered 800–803: 157, 802 Last numbered Burlington Northern 952; 158, 803 Last numbered Burlington Northern 953
Pennsylvania Railroad	27	5619–5640, 5906, 8485–8486, 8857–8858	
Rutland Railroad	6	400–405	400 Owned By Maryland and Delaware Railroad 22, Currently Arkansas and Missouri Railroad 22. 405 now on the Green Mountain Railroad.
Minneapolis, St. Paul and Sault Ste. Marie Railroad ("Soo Line")	4	350–353	
Soo Line (Wisconsin Central Railway)	9	2360–2368	
Spokane International Railroad	12	200–211	
Spokane, Portland and Seattle Railway	2	50–51	
Spokane, Portland and Seattle Railway (Oregon Electric Railway)	4	52–55	
Tennessee Coal, Iron and Railroad Company	3	602–604	
United States Navy	1	6	renumbered 65-00078
Washington Terminal Company	25	40–64	Locomotive ALCO RS1 292 CYXX - Conrad Yelvington Distributors in Orlando-FL List: 46 sold to Amtrak 46, currently Massachusetts Central Railroad 46; 47 sold to Amtrak 47, currently Tioga Central Railroad 47 out of service needs friction bearings; 52 sold to Chattahoochee Industrial Railroad 57, then Conrad Yelvington Distributors 97, currently Conrad Yelvington Distributors 292; 54 sold to Chattahoochee Industrial Railroad 38, currently Conrad Yelvington Distributors 293; 57 sold to Black River and Western Railroad 57, then East Penn Railways 57, currently Allentown and Auburn Railroad 57; 59 sold to Essar Steel Algoma 59, currently Southern Railroad of New Jersey 59
Arabian American Oil Company (Saudi Arabia)	6	A11x50, A11x51, 1002–1005	
Estrada de Ferro Central do Brasil	38	3100–3137	5 ft 3 in (1,600 mm)
São Paulo Railway, (Brazil)	6	504–509	5 ft 3 in (1,600 mm) to Estrada de Ferro Santos a Jundiaí
Estrada de Ferro Santos a Jundiaí (Brazil)	2	510–511	5 ft 3 in (1,600 mm)
Total	456		

== Preservation ==
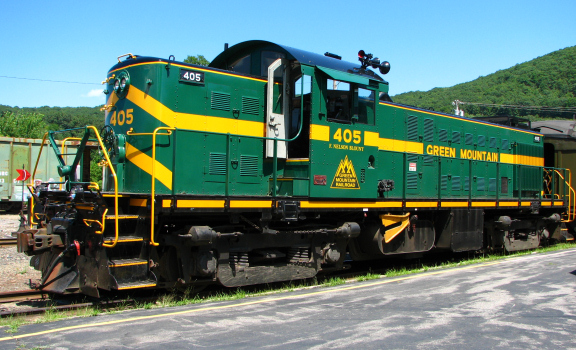
Green Mountain Railroad (formerly Rutland Railway) Alco RS1 #405 in Bellows Falls, Vermont in August 2006.

Several examples exist at tourist railways and railway museums, including:

- Algers, Winslow and Western Railway #4 - Built as Duluth, South Shore and Atlantic Railway #103, it is currently in service on the French Lick Scenic Railway, a line operated by the Indiana Railway Museum
- Ann Arbor Railroad #20 is owned by the Southern Michigan Railroad Society in Clinton, MI and on loan to Shepherd, MI Railroad Depot Museum and Display
- Ann Arbor Railroad #21 is owned by the Southern Michigan Railroad Society in Clinton, MI. #21 is set to undergo cosmetic and operational repairs and a return to operational status by the end of 2015.
- Boone & Scenic Valley Railroad's RS-1 purchased in 1951 by the Lake Superior and Ishpeming Railroad as #1002, sold to the Calumet & Hecla Railroad in 1967 as #205. Later purchased by Continental Grain Company, Marshalltown, IA c. 1975. Donated to the Iowa Railroad Historical Society, Boone & Scenic Valley Railroad in 1996, painted and lettered as Minneapolis and St. Louis Railway #244.
- Catskill Mountain Railroad #400 (out of service & under repair) and #401 (operating) tourist train in Kingston NY.
- Chicago, Rock Island & Pacific 743 is on display at the Oklahoma Railway Museum in Oklahoma City, OK.
- Chicago, Rock Island & Pacific 745 (believed to be the oldest existing RS-1, and one of the replacements for the 13 taken by the U.S. Army) at the Louisiana Steam Train Association yard in Jefferson, LA
- Consumers Power (CPOX) 401 1951 built RS-1 #79350 former Rutland 401 spent her final years of service switching coal cars at Consumers Energy's Essexville, MI power plant on the Saginaw River the unit is now at the Saginaw Railway Museum.
- Duluth, South Shore and Atlantic Railway #101, previously the only known locomotive existing from that railroad, is at the Lake Superior Railroad Museum and has been restored for occasional use on the North Shore Scenic Railroad.
- Eastman Kodak Company 9 (built as Chicago & Western Indiana 260, sold to Genesee & Wyoming in 1971 and then to EKC) is preserved at the Rochester & Genesee Valley Railroad Museum.
- Grand Trunk Western 1951 (last domestic RS-1 produced serial number 82356) at the Illinois Railway Museum
- Great Northern 182 is on display at the West Coast Railway Heritage Park in Squamish, British Columbia.
- Green Mountain Railroad 405 (former Rutland Railway 405, serial number 79575)
- Livonia Avon & Lakeville 20 (built as Lake Erie, Franklin & Clarion 20, sold to Livonia Avon & Lakeville) is preserved at the Rochester & Genesee Valley Railroad Museum.
- Soo Line 350 survives on display at the Whippany Railway Museum in New Jersey as Morristown & Erie 21.
- Washington Terminal #57 is undergoing mechanical restoration on the Allentown and Auburn Railroad in Topton, Pennsylvania.
- Two RS-1s are on display at the US Department of Energy's Hanford Site's B Reactor along with two flatcars.

== See also ==
- List of ALCO diesel locomotives
- List of MLW diesel locomotives
