= Canadian National class K-3 =

Type and origin
- Power type: Steam
- Build date: 1910–1913
- Total produced: 70
Specifications
- Configuration
  - Whyte: 4-6-2
  - UIC: 2'C1'
- Gauge: 4 ft 8 1/2 in (1,435 mm)
- Driver dia.: 73 in (1,854 mm)
- Fuel type: Coal
- Boiler pressure: 195 lbf/in^{2} (13.7 kg/cm^{2})
- Cylinders: Two, outside
- Cylinder size: 23 in × 28 in (584 mm × 711 mm)
- Valve gear: Walschaerts
- Valve type: Piston valves
- Loco brake: Air
- Train brakes: Air
- Couplers: Knuckle
Performance figures
- Tractive effort: 34,000 lbf (151.2 kN)
Career
- Operators: {{Grand Trunk Railway|Canadian National Railway}}
- Numbers: 5557-5626
- Retired: 1961
- Preserved: CN 5588
- Scrapped: 1950-1961
- Disposition: 2 preserved, remainder scrapped

Canadian National Railway (CN) Class K-3 steam locomotives were of 4-6-2 wheel arrangement in the Whyte notation, or " 2'C1' " in UIC classification. 70 of these locomotives were built for the Grand Trunk Railway (GT) from 1910 through 1913. The class remained in passenger service until the final replacement of steam with diesel locomotives. Number 5588 was preserved in Windsor, Ontario.

Builder	Works numbers	Dates	CN numbers	GT numbers	Notes
Baldwin	34908-34910; 34943; 34992	1910	5604-5607; 5611	295-299	
GT shops	1500-1537	1910-1912	5557-5568; 5578-5596; 5598-5603; 5609-5610	200-232; 288; 290-294	
MLW	50316-50330	1911	5612-5626	1100-1114	built for Grand Trunk Pacific Railway
Baldwin	37563	1912	5608	289	
MLW	51912-51921	1913	5569-5577; 5597	233-242	
