= Arkansas and Missouri Railroad =

Class III shortline railroad in Arkansas

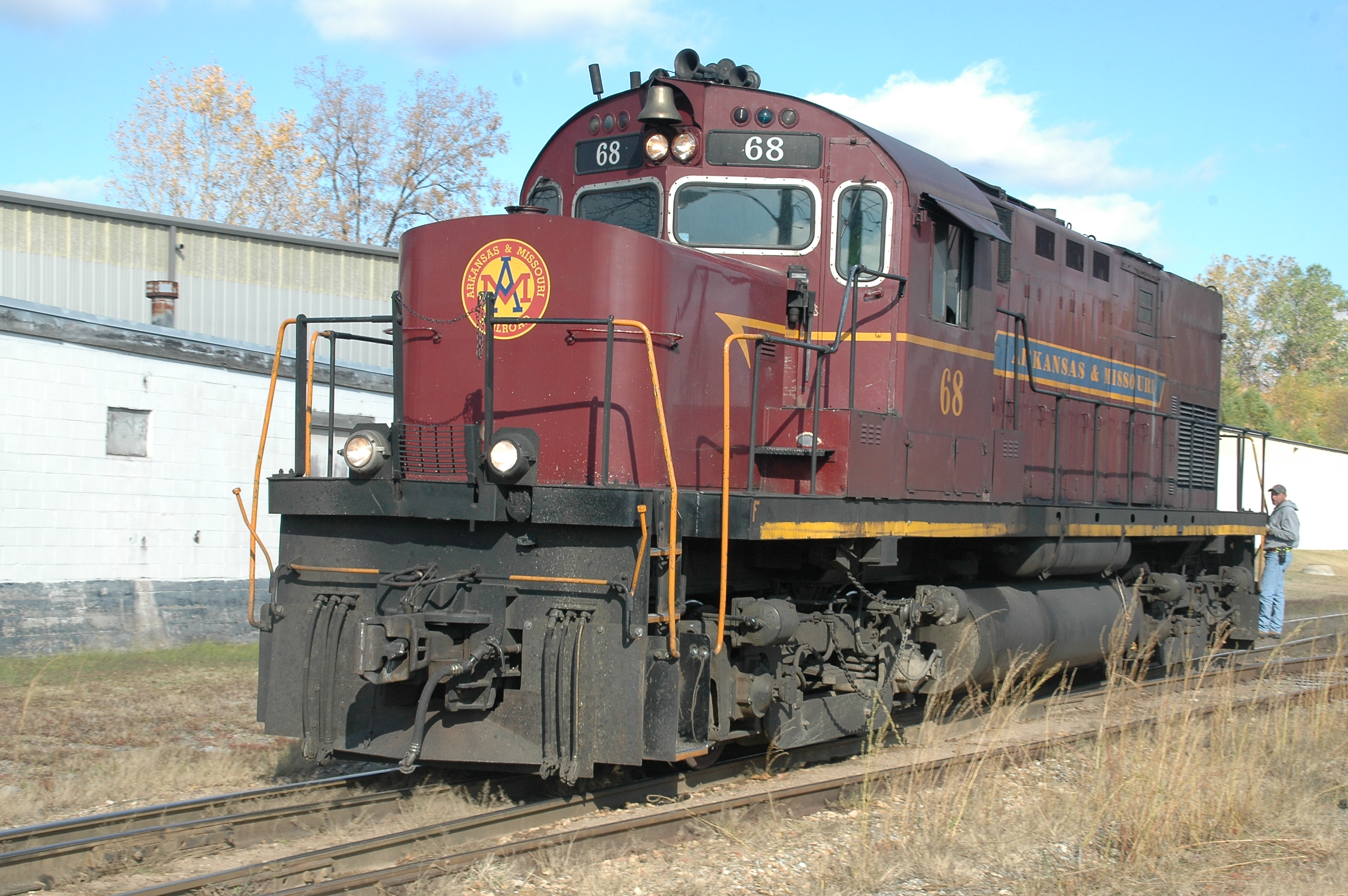
- Alco C420 No. 68 pulls in at Van Buren, Arkansas

Overview
- Headquarters: Springdale, Arkansas
- Reporting mark: AM
- Locale: Arkansas, Missouri
- Dates of operation: 1986–

Technical
- Track gauge: 4 ft 8 1/2 in (1,435 mm)
- Length: 134 mi (216 km)

The Arkansas and Missouri Railroad (reporting mark AM) is a Class III short-line railroad headquartered in Springdale, Arkansas.

The A&M, as it is known, operates 139.5 miles (224.5 km) of line from Fort Smith, Arkansas to Monett, Missouri. The railroad interchanges freight cars with CPKC Railway at Fort Smith, with Union Pacific Railroad at Van Buren, Arkansas, and with BNSF Railway at Monett. A branch line connects Bentonville, Arkansas, with the main line in Rogers, Arkansas. A&M also leases 3.2 miles (5.1 km) of track (locally known as "the Bottoms") from Union Pacific at Van Buren, and provides haulage services for Union Pacific between Van Buren and the Fort Smith Railroad in Fort Smith.

Freight operations are based out of the headquarters location in Springdale as well as Fort Smith. Freight customers are predominantly located in those two geographic areas. The rail line was substantially upgraded between 2002 and 2005 and features continuous welded rail across its entire main line. The line handles 286,000 lb (130,000 kg) railcars and has vertical clearances sufficient for double-stack intermodal cars throughout. Most traffic is handled in scheduled freight trains although shuttle trains of corn make regular appearances in the Springdale area using locomotives from Union Pacific. Freight services operate seven days per week.

Traffic generally consists of grain and feed supplements, paper products, sand, plastic, food products, steel, scrap, lumber, aluminum, and mineral products.

== Passenger Service ==
The A & M Railroad company also operates seasonal excursion trains between Springdale, Winslow and Van Buren, Arkansas. Trains generally operate Wednesday, Friday, Saturday and Sunday from March to November. The route features a tunnel and several major trestles as it passes through the Boston Mountains. Special Christmas trains operate for kids in December called Holiday Express. Additional trains operate Sundays between Springdale and Fort Smith, Arkansas in the summer. Special trains operate in the October–November fall foliage season and at other times of the year.

Coach #104 “Biloxi Blues” was used in the Neil Simon movie of the same name. The filming was done at Fort Chaffee, Van Buren, and on the Arkansas & Missouri Railroad. The car, built for the Delaware, Lackawanna & Western’s steam powered suburban service out of Hoboken, New Jersey, reportedly carried commuters in New Jersey until 1982. The car was built by Pullman in 1917 as an early steel car using many of the design standards used with earlier wooden cars. It has open end platforms (one of the last large orders of open-platform coaches ever built), windows that open, and clerestory roofs. The car seats 72 passengers and has no air conditioning. It is the oldest car over 100 yrs. old.

Coach #105 “Golden Age” was built by Harlan and Hollingsworth (Bethlehem Steel) in 1927 for the New Jersey Central Railroad. Harlan & Hollingsworth was a Wilmington, Delaware, firm that constructed ships and railroad cars. It was acquired by Bethlehem Steel during December 1904. The shipyard closed in 1926. However, railcars were built on the site until 1940, and parts for railroad cars until 1944. The car served in commuter service for many years, and has closed vestibules. The car has 72 passenger seats as well as a Conductor cabin. The car has heat and air conditioned.

Coach #106 “Mountain View” is a sister to coach #105 with a similar history. It also seats 72 passengers plus two more seats next to the restroom. It too has heat and air conditioned.

Parlor Car #107 “Explorer” was built by Pullman Standard in 1955-1956 as Long Island Railroad class P72 coach 2927. The car was rebuilt in 1989 by the LIRR as class PP72B parlor car 2002. This car was one of only two “dual mode” parlor cars, capable of drawing power from either its installed diesel generator system or from a trainline. When the car was retired, it was acquired by Ken Bitten and used as a table car on the Northern Central Railway in Pennsylvania. After the Northern Central shut down, the car moved to the Arkansas & Missouri Railroad in December 2004. This car also has an open platform.

Coach #108 “Silver Feather Premium” started life as Western Pacific dome coach #812 “Silver Feather,” built by Budd in 1948 for the famous California Zephyr. Today, the car has table seating in the dome and vestibule end because of its later use in a dinner train. When retired, the car went to the auto-train where it was painted and renumbered as #461. By the mid-1980s, the car was restored to its California Zephyr look and name and served on the Texas Southern operation. The car then became Washington Central (WCRC) #151 in 1993 before moving to BC Rail and their Pacific Starlight Dinner Train in 1997. There, the car retained the 151 number, but acquired the name “Moonglow.” With changes on the railroad, the operation was shut down and the car listed for sale by late 2002. In February 2004, the car was sold to the Ontario Northland and renumbered 901. The car was again sold in December, 2010, and arrived on the Arkansas & Missouri by late 2011, where it was numbered 108 and renamed “Silver Feather.”

#109 “Spirit of Arkansas” Diner-Lounge #8322 entered service on August 20, 1950, as a Southern Pacific Sunset Limited “Pride of Texas” coffee shop-lounge car. Numbered SP 10409, the car was decorated with Texas cattle brands and featured inexpensive meals for coach passengers. Known by some as a hamburger grill car, the car was built by Budd with 32 dining table seats, 14 lounge-table seats, a bar and a kitchen. The car became Amtrak 8322 in 1971. After being retired, the car became owned by Hank Peterson (RPCX 8322) and used on trips on the Ohio Central, including during the 2006 NRHS convention. The A&M acquired the car in early 2014.

== History ==
The line was built between 1880 and 1882 by the St. Louis and San Francisco Railway ("Frisco"), a predecessor of Burlington Northern Railroad, and was leased by the latter to the Arkansas and Missouri in 1986. The company completed purchase of the property in early 2001. The lease of Union Pacific trackage in an area known as "the Bottoms" occurred in 2000. In 2010,/ A&M purchased "the Bottoms" from UP. The railroad serves numerous team tracks, warehouses and transload facilities, as well as port facilities on the Arkansas River in Fort Smith and Van Buren.

The company was an all-Alco/MLW locomotive fleet for switching and excursion operations. The fleet consisted of C-420s, T-6s, C-424s, M-420s, and one each RS-32, HR-412, and RS-1 until 2013 when the railroad acquired three EMD SD70ACe's and later a 4th one from KCS. As of late 2023, the railroad recently acquired 2 SD70ACe-P4s from TMBL.

On October 16, 2014, an A&M locomotive and excursion train collided head-on near Brentwood, Arkansas.
