= MLW RS-10 =

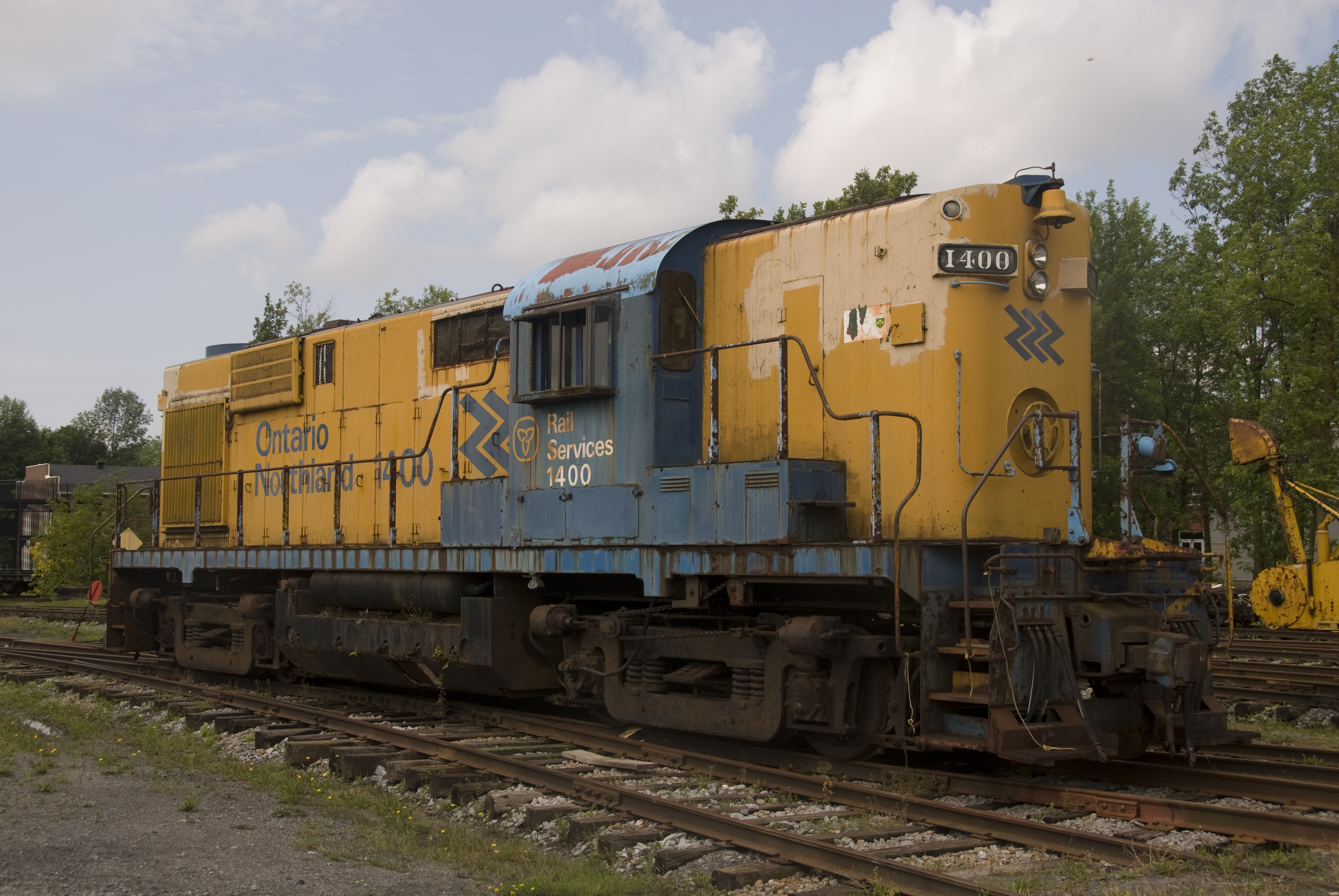
- Ontario Northland Railway #1400
Type and origin
- Power type: Diesel-electric
- Builder: Montreal Locomotive Works (MLW)
- Model: RS-10
- Build date: December 1954 – February 1957
- Total produced: 129
Specifications
- Configuration
  - AAR: B-B
  - UIC: Bo′Bo′
- Gauge: 4 ft 8 1/2 in (1,435 mm)
- Length: 53 ft 1 in (16.18 m)
- Loco weight: 243,000 lb (110,000 kg)
- Fuel capacity: 1,200 US gal (4,500 L; 1,000 imp gal)
- Prime mover: ALCO 12-244
- Engine type: Four-stroke diesel
- Aspiration: Turbocharger
- Displacement: 8,016 cu in (131.36 L)
- Cylinders: V12
- Cylinder size: 9 in × 10.5 in (229 mm × 267 mm)
- Transmission: DC generator, DC traction motors
- Loco brake: Straight air; Optional: Dynamic
- Train brakes: Air
Performance figures
- Maximum speed: 65 mph (105 km/h)
- Power output: 1,600 hp (1,190 kW)
- Tractive effort: 60,875 lbf (270.79 kN)
Career
- Locale: Canada

The Montreal Locomotive Works RS-10 was a 1,600 horsepower (1,200 kW) diesel locomotive built for the Canadian market. It was essentially an ALCO RS-3 in a redesigned carbody. It retained the RS-3's 12-cylinder Alco 244 engine. MLW built 129 of these locomotives before the model was replaced by the MLW RS-18.

== Original owners ==
Image	Railway	Quantity	Road number	Notes
	Canadian National Railway	51	1863–1885, 3066–3093	
	Canadian Pacific Railway	66	8462–8482, 8557–8600, 8824	8824 was built using parts from wrecked FA-1 4016, and re-used that unit's frame number
	Ontario Northland Railway	4	1400–1403	
	Pacific Great Eastern Railway	8	579–586	to British Columbia Railway
	Total	129		

== See also ==
- List of MLW diesel locomotives
