= List of MLW diesel locomotives =

Following is a list of diesel locomotives built by the Montreal Locomotive Works, a Canadian subsidiary of the American Locomotive Company from 1904-1964. From 1964-1975 the company was known as MLW-Worthington and was owned by Bombardier from 1975 until its closure in 1985.

== Switchers (S series) ==
Model	Specification	Build date	Total produced	Wheel arrangement	Prime mover	Power output	Image
S-2	E1540	1940–1950	40	B-B	6-539T	1,000 hp (750 kW)	
S-3	E-1530A	1950–1957	163	B-B	6-539	660 hp (490 kW)	
S-4	E-1540A, E-1540B	1949–1957	146	B-B	6-539T	1,000 hp (750 kW)	
E-1800	E-1800	1951	2	B-B	none	yard slug	
E-1800	E-1800a	1957	2	B-2	none	yard slug	
S-7	DL-1000 or ME-1000	1957	29	B-B	6-539T	1,000 hp (750 kW)	
S-10	DL-066	1958	13	B-B	6-539	660 hp (490 kW)	
S-11	DL-406	1959	10	B-B	6-539	660 hp (490 kW)	
S-12	DL-410	1958	11	B-B	6-539T	1,000 hp (750 kW)	
S-13	DL-411, DL-411A	1959–1967	56	B-B	6-251C	1,000 hp (750 kW)	

== Cab units (FA & FP series) ==
Model	Specification	Build date	Total produced	Wheel arrangement	Prime mover	Power output	Image
FA-1	DL-208A, DL-208B	1949-1950	28	B-B	12-244B	1,500 hp (1.12 MW)	
FB-1	DL-209A, DL-209B	1949-1950	20	B-B	12-244B	1,500 hp (1.12 MW)	
FA-2	DL-212, DL-212A	1951–1953	45	B-B	12-244	1,600 hp (1.19 MW)	
FB-2	DL-213, DL-213A	1951–1953	21	B-B	12-244	1,600 hp (1.19 MW)	
FPA-2	DL-212, DL-212A	1953–1955	19	B-B	12-244D	1,600 hp (1.19 MW)	
FPB-2	DL-213, DL-213A	1953–1955	14	B-B	12-244D	1,600 hp (1.19 MW)	
FPA-4	DL-218	1958–1959	34	B-B	12-251B	1,800 hp (1.34 MW)	
FPB-4	DL-219	1958–1959	12	B-B	12-251B	1,800 hp (1.34 MW)	

== Early roadswitchers (RS, RSC, RSD series) ==
=== RS series (B-B) ===
Model	Specification	Build date	Total produced	Wheel arrangement	Prime mover	Power output	Image
RS-1	ME1000R (E-1641A)	1954	3	B-B	6-539T	1,000 hp (750 kW)	
RS-2	ME1500R (E-1661B)	1946–1950	9	B-B	12-244	1,500 hp (1,120 kW)	
RS-3	ME1600R (E-1662, E-1662A, E1662B)	1951–1956	146	B-B	12-244	1,600 hp (1,190 kW)	
RS-10	DL-700	1954–1957	129	B-B	12-244	1,600 hp (1,190 kW)	
RS-11	DL-701	1957, 1963–1964	76	B-B	12-251B	1,800 hp (1,340 kW)	
RS-18	DL-718	1956–1968	351	B-B	12-251B	1,800 hp (1,340 kW)	
RS-23	DL-811A	1959–1966	40	B-B	6-251C	1,000 hp (750 kW)	

=== RSC series (A1A-A1A) ===
Model	Specification	Build date	Total produced	Wheel arrangement	Prime mover	Power output	Image
RSC-3	E-1662, E-1662A, E-1662B	1950–1952	99	A1A-A1A	12-244	1,600 hp (1,190 kW)	
RSC-13	DL-800	1955–1957	35	A1A-A1A	6-539T	1,000 hp (750 kW)	
RSC-24	DL-814	1959	4	A1A-A1A	12-244	1,400 hp (1,040 kW)	
RSC-14	DL-814	1975–1976	38	A1A-A1A	12-251B	1,400 hp (1,040 kW)	(RS-18 rebuild with A1A-A1A trucks from RSC-13 by CN)

=== RSD series (C-C) ===
Model	Specification	Build date	Total produced	Wheel arrangement	Prime mover	Power output	Image
RSD-12	DL-702	1956–1963	10	C-C	12-251B	1,800 hp (1,340 kW)	for Companhia Siderúrgica Nacional-Brazil
RSD-17	DL600B (DL-624)	1957	1	C-C	16-251B	2,400 hp (1,790 kW)	
RSD-35	DL-535E	1969–1971	10	Co-Co	6-251D	1,200 hp (890 kW)	7 units built by Alco and completed by MLW in 1969, 3 units built by MLW in 1971
RSD-39	DL-535B	1974	3	C-C	6-251D	1,200 hp (890 kW)	PeruRail ##433-436
RSD-39	DL-535B	1974	2	C-C	6-251D	1,200 hp (890 kW)	
RSD-35	DL-535E (W)	1982	4	C-C	6-251D	1,200 hp (890 kW)	all built by BBD, Held in Montreal (Quebec) until 1991; single unit to White Pass & Yukon which in turn was sold to Cumbres and Toltec, and 3 to US Gypsum

== Later road switchers ==
=== 4-axle units ===
Model	Specification	Build date	Total produced	Wheel arrangement	Prime mover	Power output	Image
C-424	DL-640A	1963–1967	92	B-B	16-251B	2,400 hp (1,790 kW)	
M-420		1973–1977	90	B-B	12-251C	2,000 hp (1,490 kW)	
M-420B		1975	8	B-B	12-251C	2,000 hp (1,490 kW)	
M-420R		1974–1975	5	B-B	12-251C	2,000 hp (1,490 kW)	
M-420TR	type 1	1972	2	B-B	12-251C	2,000 hp (1,490 kW)	built for Roberval and Saguenay
M-420TR	type 2	1975	15	B-B	12-251C	2,000 hp (1,490 kW)	built for Ferrocarril del Pacifico
M-424		1980-1981	72	B-B	12-251E	2,400 hp (1,790 kW)	(16 built for Ferrocarril del Pacifico, 3 built for Unidos del Sureste and 53 for Ferrocarriles Nacionales de México)

=== 6-axle units ===
Model	Build date	Total produced	Wheel arrangement	Prime mover	Power output	Image
M-627			C-C			
MX615	1972–1979	74	1C-C1	8-251F	1,500 horsepower (1,100 kW)	
MX620	1973–1980	145	C-C	12-251C3	2,000 horsepower (1,500 kW)	
MX624	1975–1983	69	C-C	12-251E	2,400 horsepower (1,800 kW)	
MX626 (Yugoslavia)	1972–1982	32	C-C	12-251F	2,700 horsepower (2,000 kW)	
MX-627 (Greece)	1973	20	C-C	12-251F	2,662 horsepower (1,985 kW)	
MX627	1972–1978	33	C-C	12-251F	2,700 horsepower (2,000 kW)	
MX630	1974–1980	30	C-C	12-251E	3,000 horsepower (2,200 kW)	
MX636	1974–1980	10	C-C	12-251F	3,600 horsepower (2,700 kW)	
MXS620	1973–1982	100	C-C	12-251C3	2,000 horsepower (1,500 kW)	
MXS624	1973–1983	33	C-C	12-251E	2,400 horsepower (1,800 kW)	
MXS627	1978–1980	10	C-C	12-251F	2,700 horsepower (2,000 kW)	
MXS630	1978–1982	33	C-C	12-251E	3,000 horsepower (2,200 kW)	
C-630M	1965–1969	56	C-C	16-251E	3,000 horsepower (2,200 kW)	
M-630	1969–1973	75	C-C	16-251E	3,000 horsepower (2,200 kW)	
M-630W			C-C	16-251E	3,000 horsepower (2,200 kW)	
M-636	1969–1975	185	C-C	16-251F	3,600 horsepower (2,700 kW)	
M-636 (Australia)			C-C	16-251F	3,600 horsepower (2,700 kW)	
MX-636 (Greece)	1974–1975	10	C-C	16-251F	3,500 horsepower (2,600 kW)	
M-640	1971	1	C-C	18-251F	4,000 horsepower (3,000 kW)	

=== DL series ===
Model	Build date	Total produced	Wheel arrangement	Prime mover	Power output	Image
DL-500S						
DL-535E	1969–1971, 1982	14	C-C	6-251C, 6-251D	1,000 hp (750 kW), 1,200 hp (890 kW)	see RSD-35 for more information

=== HR series (actually Bombardier) ===
Model	Build date	Total produced	Wheel arrangement	Prime mover	Power output	Image
M-424	1981	53	B-B	12-251E	2,400 horsepower (1,800 kW)	built for N de M
HR-412	1981	11	B-B	12-251C3	2,000 horsepower (1,500 kW)	
HR-616	1982	20	C-C	16-251E	3,000 horsepower (2,200 kW)	

== LRC series ==
Model	Build date	Total produced	Wheel arrangement	Prime mover	Power output	Notes
LRC-1	1980	2	B-B	16-251F	3,700 horsepower (2,800 kW) 1,000 hp (750 kW) to HEP	Leased to Amtrak
LRC-2	1981–1982	21	B-B	16-251F	3,700 horsepower (2,800 kW) 1,000 hp (750 kW) to HEP	built for VIA Rail Canada.
LRC-3	1983–1984	10	B-B	16-251F	3,700 horsepower (2,800 kW) 1,000 hp (750 kW) to HEP	built for VIA Rail Canada.

== TURBO series ==
See also MLW TURBO

Model	Build date	Total produced	Wheel arrangement	Prime mover	Power output	Image
CN/VIA TurboTrain	1967-1968	8 car trainset	B-A (per locomotive)	ST6 (gas turbine)	800 horsepower (600 kW)	
