= ALCO 539T =

Diesel-powered locomotive engine

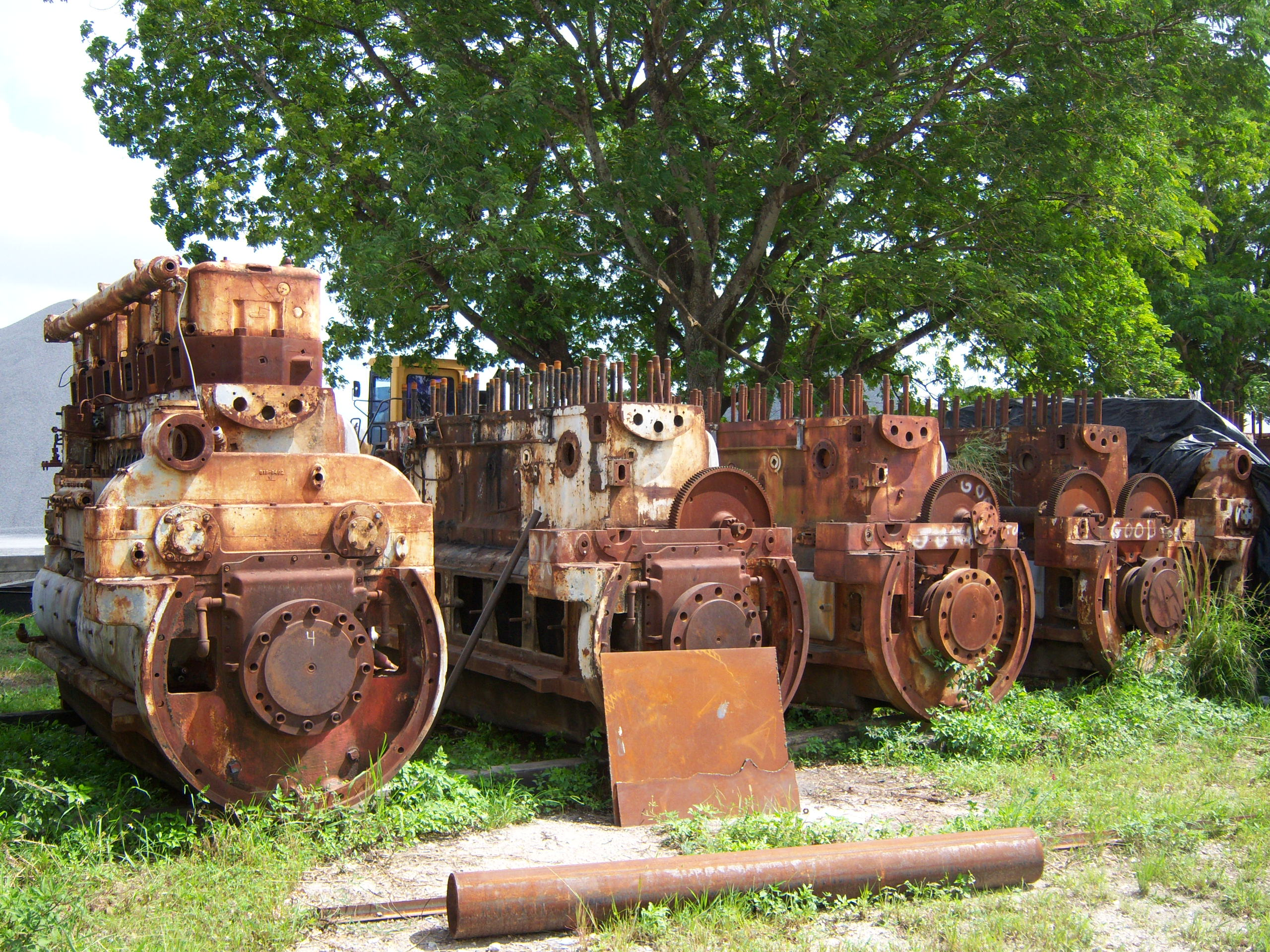
Several Alco 539T engines in various states of completion rest at an aggregate facility in Orlando, Florida.

The Alco 539T is a diesel prime mover design built by the American Locomotive Company. This engine was also used as a stationary powerplant, used in pipeline pumping stations, tugboats and dredges. It began as a straight-six, four-stroke design in a cast block which produced from 810 to 1,000 horsepower (600 to 750 kW). The engine has a bore (cylinder diameter) of 12.5 inches (318 mm), and a stroke of 13 inches (330 mm). The 539 engine was built at Alco's Auburn, New York engine plant and later starting in September 1949 in Canada. The 539T was equipped with the Buchi turbocharger, being made under license by the Elliott Manufacturing Company of Jeannette, Pennsylvania. The first 539T engines were used in S-2 switchers and DL-105 passenger locomotives built in September 1940. Alco locomotives using this engine include the S-2, S-4, RS-1, RSC-1, RSD-1, DL-105, DL-107, DL-108, DL-109, and DL-110. MLW locomotives using this engine include the S-2, S-4, S-7, S-12, RS-1, and RSC-13.

The non-turbocharged version of this engine was known as the Alco 539, and typically put out a lower horsepower rating around 660hp. It was used in lower-powered switching units such as the S1, S3, S10 and S11.

An eight-cylinder inline version of the 539T was developed by Alco. This diesel engine developed from 1,080 to 1,300 horsepower (810 to 970 kW). It was never used in a locomotive, but a twin bank V8 had been planned to be used in an early version of the “Black Maria” DL-202/DL-203 in response to EMD's FT locomotive. The inline 8-539T was used in stationary and marine applications.

== Development history ==
The 539 engine was developed in response to the perceived drawback that Alco's line of diesel switchers had a restricted field of vision because of the high hood. Both Baldwin and EMC were offering diesel switchers with a lower engine hood that the trainmen could see over. The 539 engine was developed from the 538 engine, both had the same cylinder dimensions. The engine base of the 538 was flat and rode on a flat underframe. The change that the 539 offered was to lower the base of the engine into the frame. This was done with revised mounting lugs and a modified oil pan. The modified 538 became known as the 539 and the change allowed the engine hood to be lowered by 27 inches (69 cm).

A very similar engine developed for the United States Navy was the 540T. This engine used a welded block. The welded construction was required because the specified shock tolerance requirements prohibit the use of cast blocks. The Navy 540 was used in patrol boats, mine sweepers, mine layers, and tug boats:

- 30 of 123 Admirable-class minesweepers
  - Two 855hp ALCO 539 diesel engines, Farrel-Birmingham single reduction gear, two shafts.
- 9 of 95 Auk-class minesweepers
  - Two 1,559hp ALCO 539, Westinghouse single reduction gear

== Variations ==
Name	Engine type	Max RPM	Power (hp)	Power (kW)	Introduced	Locomotive(s)	Powerplants	Notes:
539T	L6	740	1000	750	September 1940	ALCO: S-2, S-4, RS-1, RSC-1, RSD-1, DL-105, DL-107, DL-108, DL-109, and DL-110 MLW: S-2, S-4, S-7, S-12, RS-1, and RSC-13	Pipeline pumping stations, tugboats and dredges	Heavily used on the US Admirable-class minesweepers.
540T	L6	740	1000	750	???	N/A	Patrol boats, mine sweepers, mine layers, and tug boats	
