= ALCO S-2 and S-4 =

Class of diesel locomotives

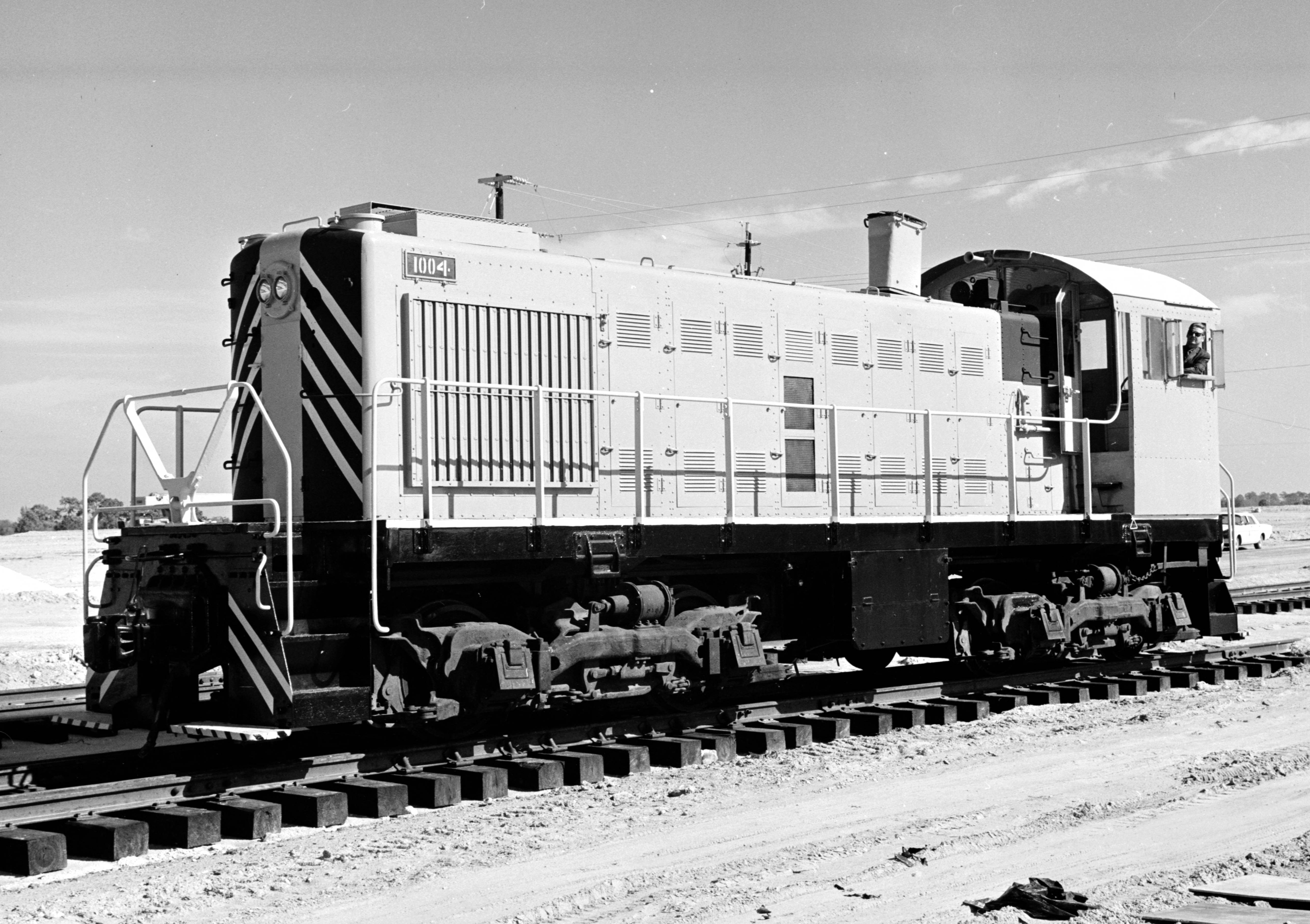
- Port Manatee Railroad No. 1004, an S-2, in Palmetto, Florida, 1971
Type and origin
- Power type: Diesel-electric
- Builder: ALCO and MLW
- Model: S-2 and S-4
- Build date: S-2: August 1940 – June 1950; S-4: June 1949 – August 1957
- Total produced: S-2: 1502, S-4: 797
Specifications
- Configuration
  - AAR: B-B
- Gauge: 4 ft 8 1/2 in (1,435 mm) standard gauge
- Trucks: S-2: Blunt; S-4: AAR type A
- Wheel diameter: 40 in (1,016 mm)
- Minimum curve: 50° or 118.31 ft (36.06 m)
- Wheelbase: 30 ft 6 in (9.30 m)
- Length: 46 ft (14.02 m)
- Width: 10 ft 2 1/2 in (3.11 m)
- Height: 14 ft 6 in (4.42 m)
- Loco weight: 230,000 lb (100,000 kg)
- Fuel capacity: 635 US gal (2,400 L; 529 imp gal)
- Prime mover: ALCO 6-539T
- Engine type: Inline 6 Four-stroke diesel
- Aspiration: Turbocharged
- Displacement: 1,595 cu in (26.14 L) per cylinder 9,572 cu in (156.86 L) total
- Generator: GE GT 553-A
- Traction motors: (4) GE 731
- Cylinders: 6
- Cylinder size: 12 1/2 in × 13 in (318 mm × 330 mm)
Performance figures
- Power output: 1,000 hp (746 kW) @ 740 rpm
- Tractive effort: 57,500 lb (26,100 kg)
Career
- Locale: United States, Canada, Mexico, Australia

The ALCO S-2 and S-4 are 1,000-horsepower (746 kW) diesel electric switcher locomotives produced by ALCO and Canadian licensee Montreal Locomotive Works (MLW).

Powered by turbocharged, 6-cylinder ALCO 539 diesel engines, the two locomotives differed mainly in their trucks: the S-2 had ALCO "Blunt" trucks; the S-4, AAR type A switcher trucks. A total of 1,502 S-2s were built from August 1940 to June 1950; 797 S-4s were built from June 1949 to August 1957. The S-4 was first produced in Canada, with ALCO production beginning in June 1949.

The S-2 and S-4 were designed as rail yard switchers, meant to replace older, less efficient, and more demanding steam switchers. They were a success, with many remaining in service today.

The locomotives' exterior was styled by ALCO engineer Ray Patten, who used curves in a mild application of Art Deco principles.

The S-2 and S-4 are distinguishable externally from the very similar S-1 and S-3 660 hp (492 kW) switchers in that they have a larger exhaust stack with an oblong base and a larger radiator shutter area on the nose sides. The S-1/S-3 radiator shutter area is taller than it is wide, while the S-2/S-4 radiator area is wider. The larger stack is due to turbocharging. The carbody and cab of late S-2s are nearly indistinguishable from those of S-4s. Hence, a truck swap can cause many to misidentify a unit.

== Survivors ==
A few S-2s and S-4s are still in service on short line railroads around the United States. Several more are preserved in U.S. and Canadian railroad museums.

=== Operable ===
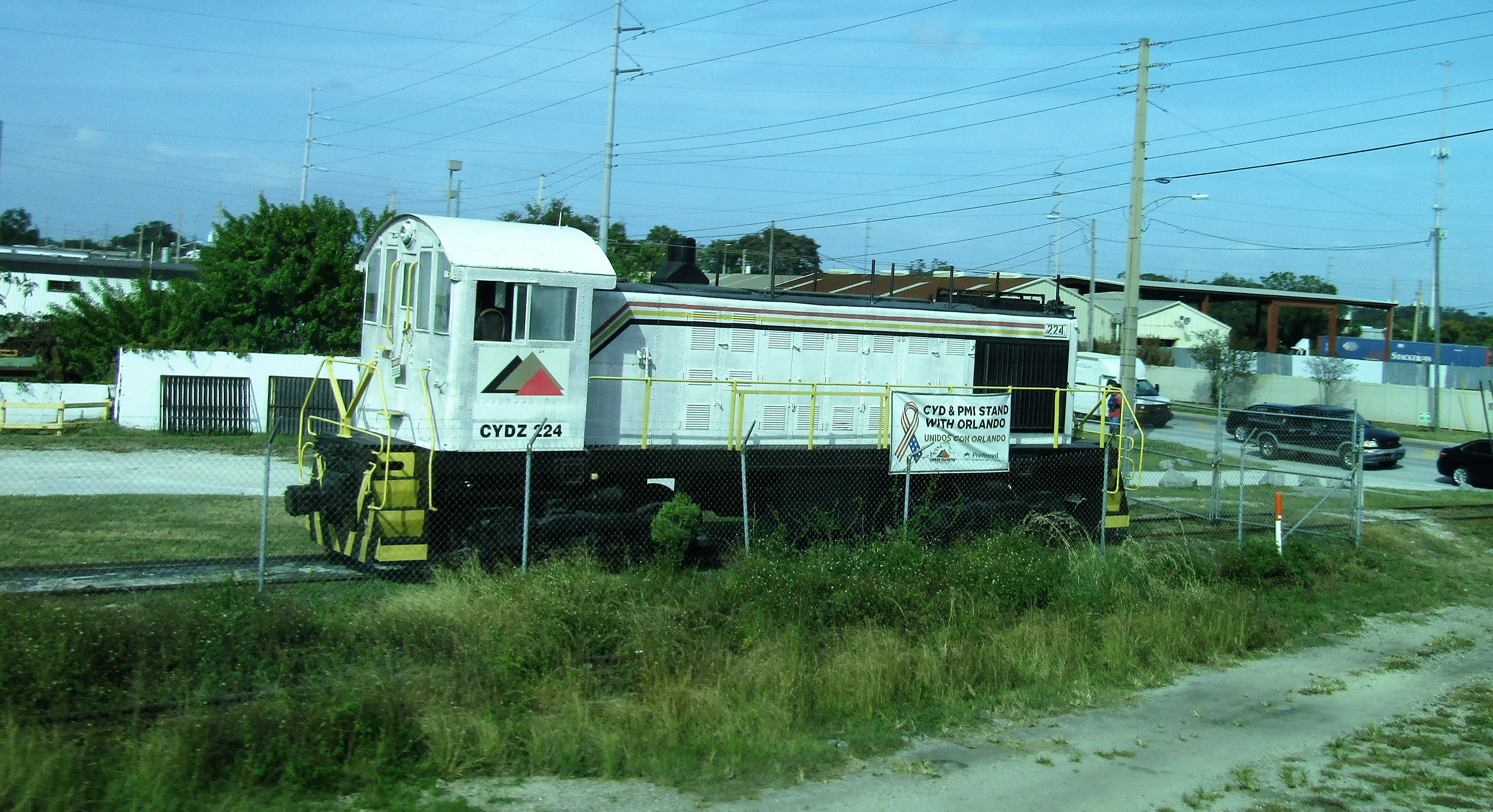
ALCO S-2 #224 CYDZ (Conrad Yelvington Distributors) in Orlando, FL.

Conrad Yelvington Distributors, an aggregate supplier in Orlando, Florida, owns and operates six S-2 locomotives and one S-4 locomotive. The S-2s include former C&O 5029, B&O 516 Ontario Northland 1202 and 1201, and Seaboard Air Lane 1428 and 1431. They are now Conrad Yelvington Nos. 224, 238, 239, 251, 317, and 366, respectively. The S-4, formerly C&O No. 5105, is now Conrad Yelvington No. 365.

The Oil Creek and Titusville Railroad operates S-2s No. 75 and No. 85 on its tourist/freight railroad.

The Toledo, Lake Erie, and Western owns three ALCO S-2 locomotives and one ALCO S-4. TLEW 62, a S-2 purchased in 2012, ex. Delray Cement 62, TLEW 112, a S-2 that was part of the original TLEW roster, now reduced to a parts unit as of 2010, TLEW 5109, a S-4, and the only operating ALCO on the line currently. 5109 recently was repainted into its original Chesapeake and Ohio colors in September 2013.

An ALCO S-2 built in 1946 was serving the Columbia & Reading Railway as No. 2-26 in Columbia, Pennsylvania, during 2019 after first operating on the C&O as No. 5015 and later on six other railroads.

The North Alabama Railroad Museum in Huntsville, Alabama runs one S-2 in regular tourist excursions, Mercury and Chase No. 213. It also owns another S-2, Mercury and Chase No. 484, which returned to service with No. 213 in 2018. The museum also has ex-Santa Fe No. 1534, an ALCO S-4 that is not in service.

The San Francisco Bay Railroad, the short-line railroad for the Port of San Francisco, operates S-2 No. 23 from the San Francisco Belt Line Railroad. S-2 No. 25 (also former Belt Line) was disabled and put on static display outside the yard in 2019.

An S-2 of D&RGW heritage survives on the Big South Fork Scenic Railway, as number No. 102. It was purchased in February 1964 for the Kentucky and Tennessee Railway (K&T), and is in operable condition in Stearns, Kentucky. This was one of the diesels that replaced Southern Railway 4501 on the K&T.

Southern Pacific 1474 is in operation, in rotation, at the Orange Empire Railway Museum in Perris, California, pulling a tourist train on weekends.

The Cooperstown and Charlotte Valley Railroad operates a pair of restored ex-Canadian National units S-4 No. 3051 (formerly CN No. 8181) and S-7 No. 3052 (formerly CN No. 8223). In 2017, they acquired the former Concord and Claremont Railroad ALCO S-4 units S-4 No. 102 (formerly D&H No. 3050) and S-4 No. 104 (formerly D&H No. 3036). As of 2020, all but No. 104 were operational on the tourist passenger and maintenance of way services between Milford and Cooperstown, New York. S-7 No. 3052 is thought to be the final S-7 built that is still in operation.

The coal-hauling Beech Mountain Railroad in Alexander, West Virginia, rosters an S-2 (No. 113) and an S-4 (No. 115). Both were built new for Michigan Limestone and Chemical Company.

The Minnesota, Dakota and Western Railway operates five S-2 locomotives, MD&W Nos. 16, 17, 18, 19, and 20, which were formerly B&O 512, Y&N 220, Toledo Terminal 103, B&O 500, and Northern Pacific 716, respectively.

In the mid-1960s, Hamersley Iron purchased an S-2 for use in the Pilbara region of Western Australia.

=== Other ===
Baltimore and Ohio Railroad No. 9115 has been cosmetically restored at the West Chester Railroad. In 2022 it was repainted to its original B&O paint scheme. It is not currently in service.

Western Pacific No. 563, one of two S-4s purchased by that railroad, is preserved at the Western Pacific Railroad Museum at Portola, California.

Erie Railroad S-2 No. 518 is at the Meadville Railroad Depot Museum.

New York, Susquehanna and Western S-2 No. 206 remains on static display at the Maywood Station Museum in Maywood, New Jersey.

In Muskogee, Oklahoma, at the Three Rivers Museum, a S-2 No. 63-138 sits behind the Midland Valley Station.

The Houston Railroad Museum in Houston, Texas, has two S-2s: ex-Santa Fe No. 2350 and ex-Houston Belt and Terminal No. 14.

The Gold Coast Railroad Museum possesses NASA S-2 No. 1, which was used to switch freight at NASA's Kennedy Space Center.

In June 2023, the Western Maryland Rail Heritage Foundation called for donations to relocate an S-2 that was on a siding in Canada.

Lehigh & New England No. 611 (ex Ford Motor Company #10013) is being restored by the Railroad & Industrial Preservation Society Inc. on the Allentown & Auburn Railroad in Topton, PA.

== See also ==
- List of ALCO diesel locomotives
- List of MLW diesel locomotives
