= MLW RS-18 =

Model of Canadian 1800hp Bo′Bo′ diesel-electric locomotive

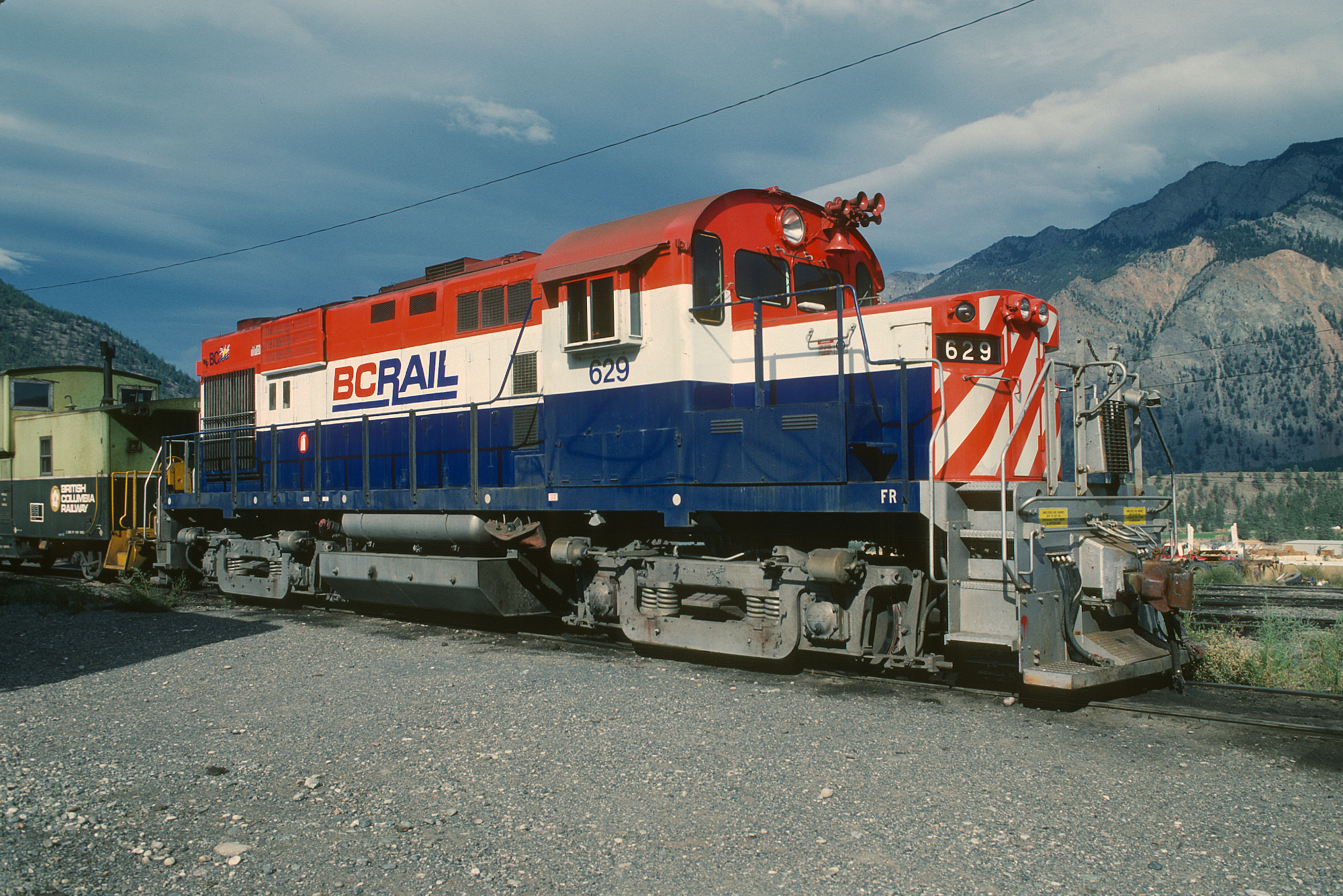
- BC Rail No. 629 at Lillooet, British Columbia in 1987
Type and origin
- Power type: Diesel-electric
- Builder: Montreal Locomotive Works
- Model: RS-18
- Build date: December 1956 to August 1968
- Total produced: 351
Specifications
- Configuration
  - AAR: B-B
  - UIC: Bo'Bo'
- Gauge: 4 ft 8 1/2 in (1,435 mm) standard gauge
- Prime mover: ALCO 12-251B
- RPM range: 1000 (max)
- Engine type: Four-stroke V12 diesel
- Displacement: 8,016 cu in (131.36 L)
- Generator: DC generator
- Traction motors: 4 DC traction motors
- Cylinders: 12
- Cylinder size: 9 in × 10.5 in (229 mm × 267 mm)
- Transmission: Electric
- Loco brake: Air, optional dynamic
- Train brakes: Air
Performance figures
- Power output: 1,800 hp (1,340 kW)
Career
- Locale: Canada

The MLW RS-18 was an 1,800 hp (1,340 kW) diesel-electric locomotive built by Montreal Locomotive Works between December 1956 and August 1968. It replaced the RS-10 in MLW's catalogue, and production totalled 351 locomotives, to eight customers.

It was the Canadian version of the ALCO RS-11, although MLW did manufacture the RS-11 for Ferrocarriles Nacionales de México.

Canadian National Railway, by far the largest buyer of the RS-18, continued to specify the long hood as the front. By contrast, while all of Canadian Pacific Railway's RS-10s were long-hood-forward, all of their RS-18s were short-hood forward. All of CN and CP's locomotives were delivered with full-height short hoods, as were the first four Pacific Great Eastern Railway, and first Roberval and Saguenay Railway unit. The remaining production was for locomotives with a low short-hood, giving the train crew much better forward vision.

== Original owners ==
| Image | Railway | Quantity | Road number | Notes |
|---|---|---|---|---|
| | Canadian National Railway | 225 | 3615–3745, 3830–3893, 3100–3129 | |
| | Canadian Pacific Railway | 72 | 8729–8800 | 68 of the 72 were rebuilt in to RS18u's numbered 1800 to 1868 |
| | Cartier Railway | 8 | 101–108 | |
| | International Nickel Company of Canada | 3 | 208-2–208-4 | |
| | Pacific Great Eastern Railway | 29 | 587–599, 614–626, 628–630 | 578–599 renumbered 601–613; to British Columbia Railway 601–630. They were rebuilt into CRS20's |
| | Quebec Iron and Titanium | 1 | 6 | Renumbered 16 |
| | Roberval and Saguenay Railway | 2 | 24, 25 | |
| | Wabush Lake Railway / Arnaud Railway | 11 | 901–911 | |
| | Totals | 351 | | |

== Preserved ==
West Chester Railroad #1803 is an ALCO RS-18 built in 1960 by the MLW for the Canadian Pacific Railway and was numbered 8762. In 1998, it was retired from service by the Canadian Pacific Railroad and was bought by the West Chester Railroad that same year, where it currently remains in service. It was re-numbered as 1803 and repainted into a Brunswick green with a yellow frame stripe.

== See also ==
- List of MLW diesel locomotives

== Sources ==
- Pinkepank, Jerry A. (1973). The Second Diesel Spotter's Guide. Milwaukee, Wisconsin: Kalmbach Publishing. pp. 208, 248–249. ISBN 978-0-89024-026-7.
