= Montreal Locomotive Works =

Defunct Canadian locomotive manufacturer

Coordinates: 45°34′9.45″N 73°31′51.83″W

- Formerly: Locomotive and Machine Company of Montreal Limited
- Founded: 1883; 143 years ago in Montreal, Quebec
- Defunct: 1985
- Fate: Sold to Bombardier Transportation in 1988 - locomotive production ended and plant sold to GE Transportation (closed in 1993)
- Headquarters: Montreal, Quebec, Canada

Montreal Locomotive Works (MLW) was a Canadian railway locomotive manufacturer that existed under several names from 1883 to 1985, producing both steam and diesel locomotives. For many years it was a subsidiary of the American Locomotive Company. MLW's headquarters and manufacturing facilities were in Montreal’s Hochelaga-Maisonneuve area (with only the 1911 administration building remaining at 1505 Dickson Street).

== Early history ==
The Locomotive and Machine Company of Montreal Limited was created in 1883, producing primarily for the growing domestic market—notably the Canadian Pacific Railway, the Grand Trunk Railway, the Intercolonial Railway and, after 1922, the Canadian National Railway.

== Purchase by Alco ==
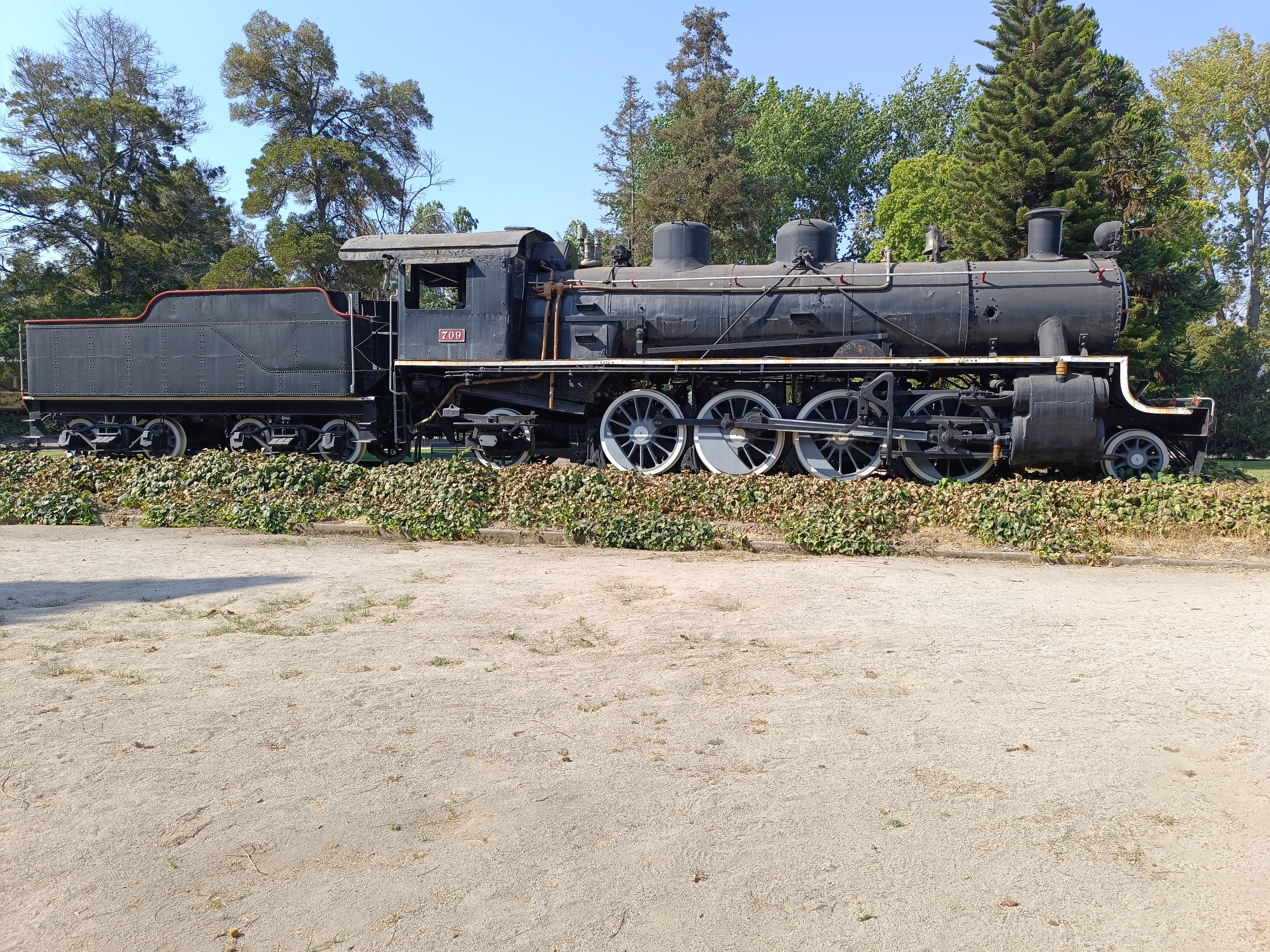
Chilean locomotive 709 of the State Railways. Built by MLW, factory number 59021. Santiago Railway Museum

In 1901, the American Locomotive Company (Alco) headquartered in Schenectady, New York, United States, was formed by the merger of several struggling locomotive manufacturers. Alco purchased the Locomotive & Machine Company of Montreal in 1904 to tap into the Canadian market with its emerging designs. The Montreal subsidiary was renamed Montreal Locomotive Works (MLW) several years later.

MLW became an exclusive Alco-design shop and acquired a substantial portion of the Canadian steam locomotive market. The period of railway expansion between 1900 and 1915 was unprecedented in Canada, with many new orders for locomotives from various domestic manufacturers. Protective customs tariffs also discouraged Canadian railways from purchasing American-built locomotives for use in Canada. Several bankrupt private systems, including the Grand Trunk and Canadian Northern, were nationalized in the years 1918–1922. Merged with the federally owned Intercolonial, they formed the federal Crown corporation Canadian National Railways. The federal government mandated that the new, larger public company purchase locomotives from all Canadian manufacturers to discourage domination of the market by any one manufacturer.

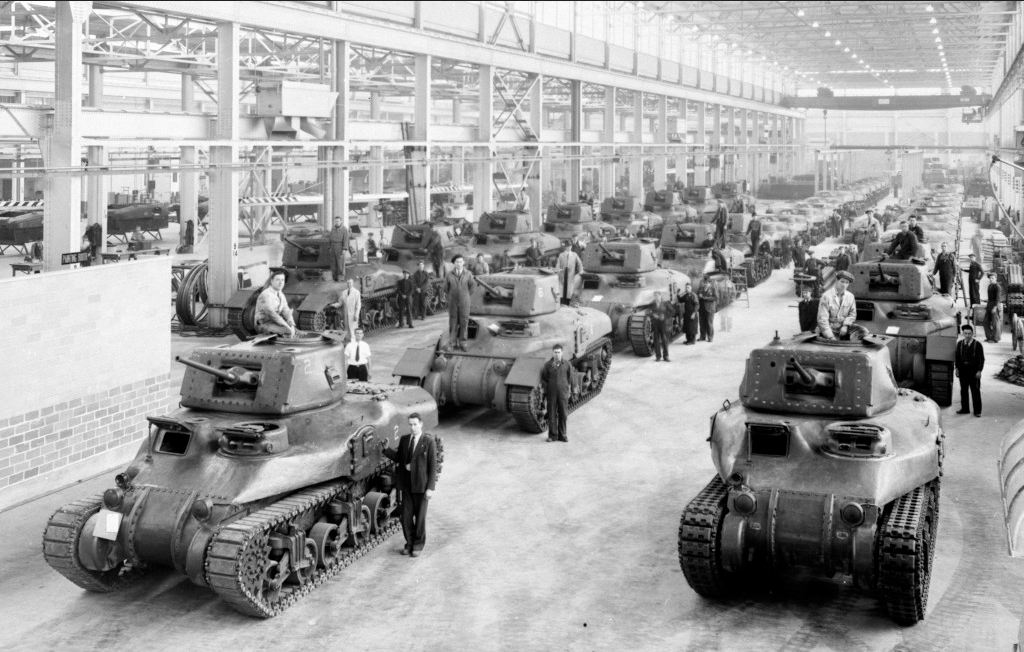
Ram tanks produced by MLW.

Between 1918 and the period after the Second World War, Canadian National modernized its steam locomotive fleet by replacing many of the units it had received from its constituent railways. MLW was a major beneficiary of these purchases, along with the Canadian Locomotive Company of Kingston, Ontario. MLW grew substantially during the Second World War when its plant facilities were converted primarily to fabricating matériel for the Commonwealth/Allied war effort (largely by a female workforce), including the Ram tank and the Sexton self-propelled gun.

== Post-war diesel competition ==
Following the war, MLW and other locomotive builders reverted to building locomotives. MLW continued to benefit from Canada's restrictive trade policies that prevented a flood of U.S. imports. However, the transition from steam to diesel-electric locomotive production opened the door to new competitors. In 1949, the Electro-Motive Division of General Motors established a Canadian subsidiary named General Motors Diesel Division (GMDD) in London, Ontario. MLW's long-established steam-locomotive competitor, the Canadian Locomotive Company (CLC), had entered into a partnership with Baldwin Locomotive Works and imported and produced the designs of Baldwin and its subsidiary Whitcomb. Westinghouse was the main supplier of Baldwin's electrical transmission components. After Baldwin folded, CLC became a licensee of Fairbanks-Morse and manufactured a number of F-M designs for the Canadian market, including the Train Master. CLC was also responsible for building General Electric industrial switchers. General Electric did not enter the road diesel-electric market in the United States until the late 1950s, a move it took after dissolving its partnership with Alco in 1953.

== Mass transit ==
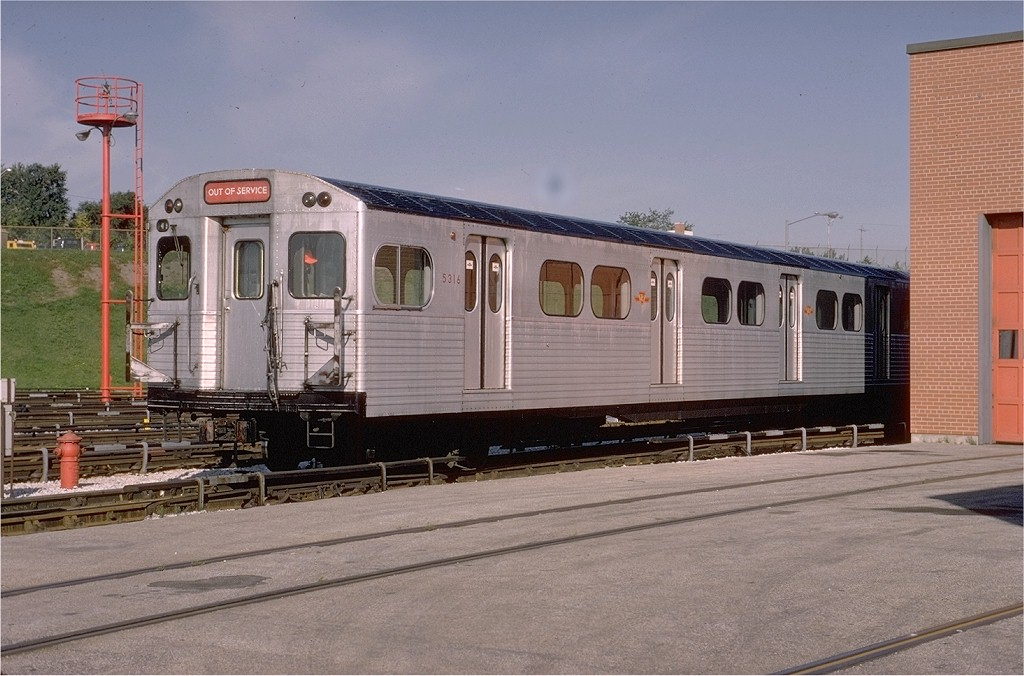
MLW M-Series subway car

In 1960, MLW was awarded the contract to build 36 subway cars for the Toronto Transit Commission. The M1 Series Subway Cars were the first rapid transit vehicles to be designed and built in Canada. They were also an improvement over the previous rolling stock, being lighter and faster, despite also being considerably larger. MLW's venture into rapid transit would be short-lived, as the Toronto Transit Commission opted for Hawker Siddeley Canada vehicles from the mid-1960s onwards to the 1980s.

== Diesel-electric production ==
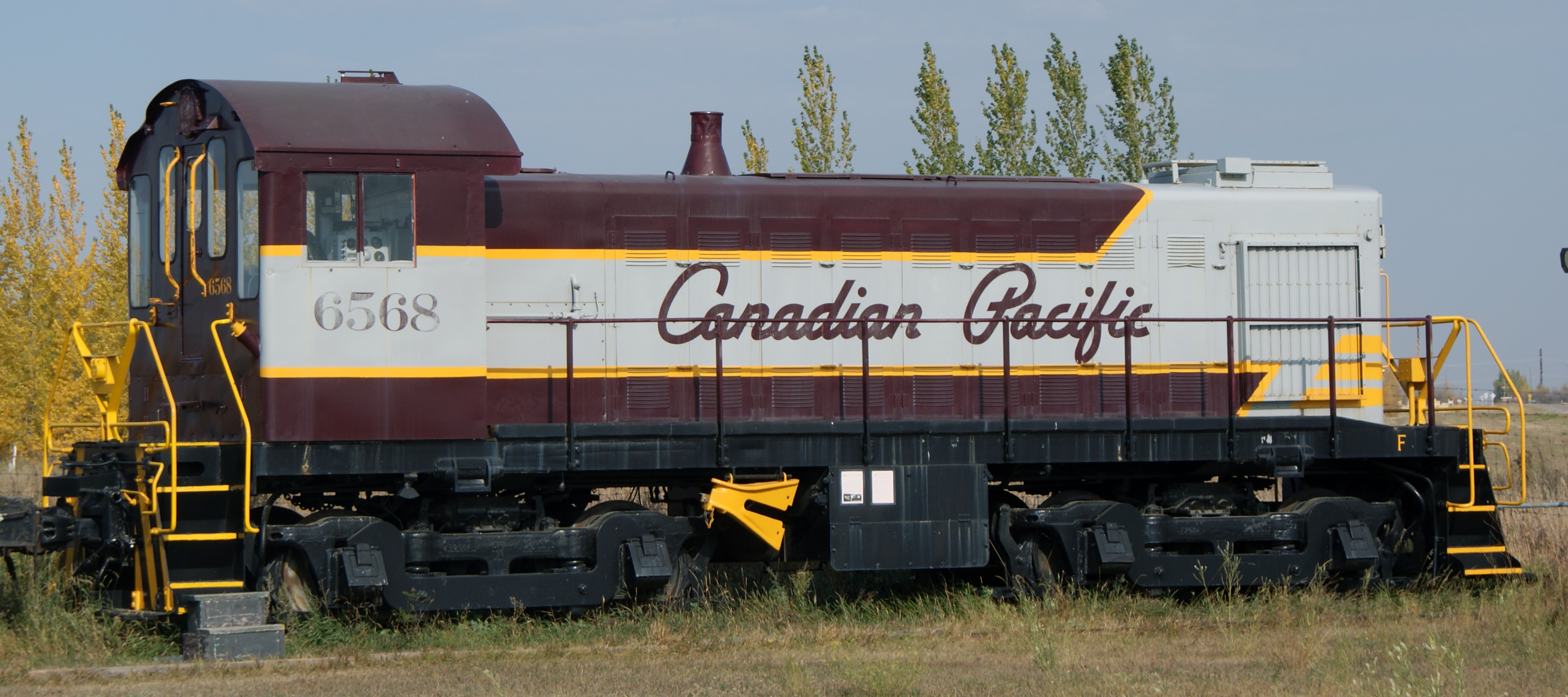
S3 660 hp (490 kW) diesel-electric locomotive, built 1957 for the Canadian Pacific Railway to designs by Alco-GE

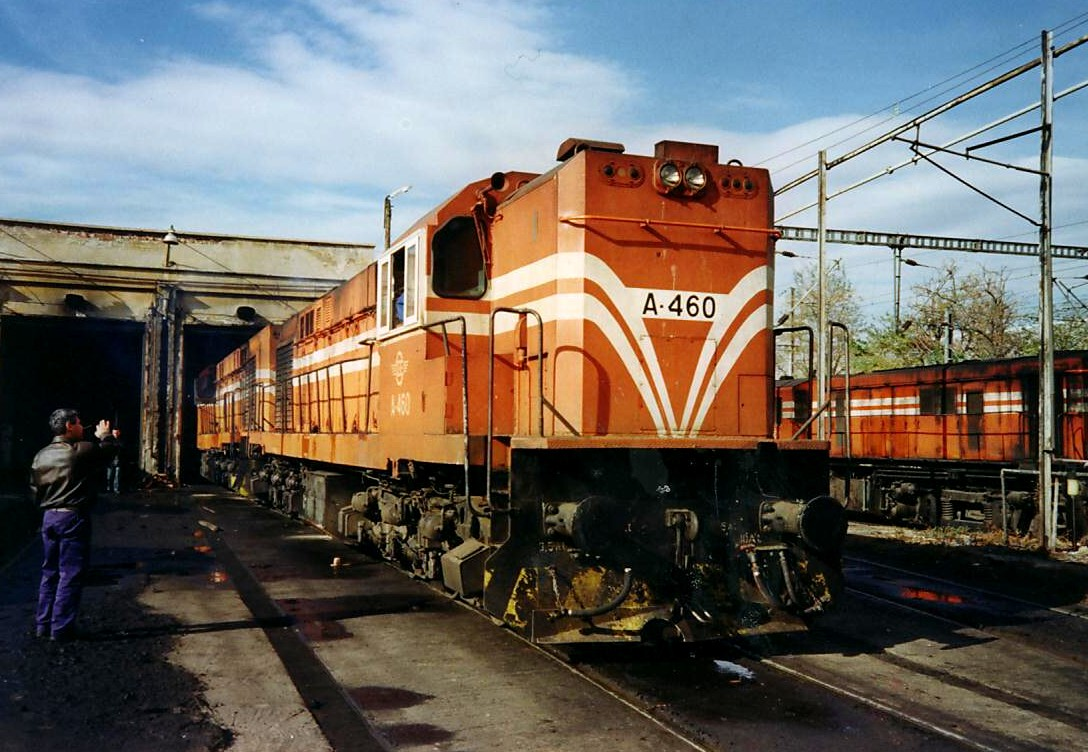
MLW MX627 locomotive of the Greek Railways, delivered in 1973

In 1949, MLW began to introduce its first Alco-GE-derived diesel designs in response to GMD, mostly switchers, some of which were given different names and slight modifications to distinguish between MLW and ALCO-GE versions. In 1951, MLW began to build Alco-GE cab units for freight and passenger service.

Canadian railways continued to rely heavily upon steam locomotives throughout the 1950s, a time when many US railroads were dieselizing. (Nevertheless, as in Canada, some Class 1 American railroads continued to use modern steam power through 1959, including the Norfolk & Western Railway and the Union Pacific Railroad.) With some isolated exceptions, and as in the United States, Canadian railways were completely dieselized by 1960.

Throughout the 1960s, Canadian National Railway (MLW's largest diesel-electric locomotive customer) continued to implement purchase policies drafted by its government owners, which spread procurement among all manufacturers. MLW / Alco-GE road switcher designs were also preferred by several railways in North America due to superior rail adhesion at low speeds, making them especially useful on steeply graded rail lines.

Like GMD in London, MLW benefited from Canadian trade policies that were less restrictive than those of the United States in regard to dealing with countries throughout the decolonizing and developing world, permitting MLW to expand a growing export business.

== MLW-Worthington ==
MLW's parent, Alco, experienced several years of declining business during the 1960s following the entry of former-partner General Electric into the road switcher locomotive manufacturing business in the United States. This was due, in part, to continuing reliance on GE's high quality electrical components, sold to Alco and MLW at a disadvantageous price by GE. Placed in a similar situation when Westinghouse left the railway rotating equipment market in 1953, Fairbanks-Morse developed its own line of such equipment, although this did not save F-M's railway business. GMD's transmissions were built to parent GM-EMD's designs, which were closely based on earlier GE equipment (prior to 1937). Alco found itself in financial difficulty in 1964 and was purchased by Worthington Corporation, a major manufacturer of equipment for the pulp and paper industry and a former builder of steam locomotive accessories. At that time MLW was renamed MLW-Worthington and continued much as before.

In 1967, Worthington Corporation merged with the Studebaker Corporation, recently exited from the auto business, to form Studebaker-Worthington, with ALCO as a wholly owned subsidiary. In 1968, several divisions of Alco became semi-independent subsidiaries, and in a 1969 corporate reorganization, Studebaker Worthington closed the Schenectady locomotive manufacturing facility. The locomotive designs were transferred in 1969 to MLW-Worthington and the diesel engine designs were sold in 1970 to White Motor Corporation. The Alco diesel engine designs went through several changes in ownership as White Motor Corporation formed White Industrial Power, which was subsequently purchased by the British General Electric Company in 1977. Renamed Alco Power Incorporated by GEC, the designs were, ironically, sold to Fairbanks-Morse in 1994.

In this period, MLW-Worthington partnered with Pratt & Whitney Canada to construct the Turbo Train fleet for Canadian National. It also continued engineering development of the ALCO 251 series engine, producing the M640 4,000-horsepower (3.0 MW) 18-cylinder prototype for Canadian Pacific in 1972. However, by this time CP had settled on the EMD 645 series SD40 and SD40-2 as their standard locomotive, and there were no further orders forthcoming from that company.

Throughout the early 1970s MLW-Worthington continued to build second-generation designs for Canadian railways. The Canadian Locomotive Company (renamed as Fairbanks-Morse, Canada) had closed in 1969, leaving MLW-Worthington as the primary competitor to the rapidly expanding GMD. During this time, at the behest of Canadian National, MLW-Worthington developed the wide-nosed "safety cab", which provided improved crew accommodation and collision protection. First appearing on the M-420 and concurrently on the EMD GP38-2, the safety cab became common on Canadian National and the British Columbia Railway. Canadian Pacific, however, never purchased any such units from MLW. This form of cab design became a North American industry standard. Although earlier wide-nosed cab designs on models such as the EMD FP45 and DDA40X bear a superficial resemblance, they lack the advances in collision protection and accommodations of the "safety cab" design.

== Purchase by Bombardier ==
In 1975, the emerging Quebec-based Bombardier purchased a 59% stake in MLW from Studebaker-Worthington. Under Bombardier, the MLW organization continued locomotive design into the early 1980s, and also benefited from its geographic location. During the 1970s, Bombardier began to enter the railway passenger car business with domestic orders for commuter and subway systems. Based on a prototype trainset constructed in the mid-1970s, in 1980 MLW began production of a fleet of high-speed diesel-powered passenger locomotives for the LRC (Light, Rapid, Comfortable) passenger trains being built for the newly created federal Crown corporation Via Rail. Similar equipment was also used briefly by Amtrak. The last of the locomotives were retired from service in 2001, although the coaches continue to form the backbone of Via's intercity corridor fleet.

By now fully merged into Bombardier, the MLW plant and design bureau also received a spurt of contracts from government-owned Canadian National Railway for the newly designed HR (High Reliability) line of freight locomotives that incorporated the Canadian safety cab or a full-width carbody; namely the four-axle HR-412 (similar to the M-420) and the full-width carbody six-axle HR-616.

The HR-616 incorporated another unique design with the "Draper Taper", named for the designer at CN, allowing for rear visibility from the cab. These locomotive designs were intended to replace aging MLW and GMD units CN had purchased during the late 1960s and early 1970s, although only a token combined order of 30 units were built. These locomotives were considered a failure as they lasted only as long as the units they were designed to replace (mid-1990s) and were considered to be mechanically and electrically unreliable, a common complaint with several ALCO/MLW designs.

In a 1985 corporate reorganization, Bombardier ceased manufacturing locomotives and concentrated on producing passenger train rolling stock (as well as aircraft following the 1986 acquisition of the federal Crown corporation Canadair), in addition to its recreational products.

The dormant MLW plant was sold to General Electric in 1988 and ironically was used by GE during a late 1980s programme of rebuilding some of its earlier "Universal series" road switchers – the locomotives that had initially driven ALCO out of the locomotive business in the United States in 1969.

GE closed the MLW manufacturing plant in 1993. The GE half of the plant was destroyed by fire in 2001; the other portion of the plant remained in use by the National Research Council of Canada.

In 2004, the remainder of the enormous complex was demolished. The nearby GE-Camco-Westinghouse plant, which is the only Canadian manufacturer of home appliances, bought half of the property to build its new shipping warehouse and a new parts store. Some of the pile of rubble from the former MLW plant is still on the vacant lot east of the corner of Dickson Street and Souligny Avenue.

Bombardier eventually returned to the locomotive manufacturing business, albeit using largely European or European-influenced passenger locomotive designs that retain none of the Alco/MLW heritage. Bombardier's North American rail manufacturing facilities are in La Pocatière, Quebec; Plattsburgh, New York; and Thunder Bay, Ontario. In 2021, Bombardier Transportation was sold to Alstom, who continue to manufacture their products.

== Products ==
- M-Series Subway Car (1961–62) for the Toronto Transit Commission
- S3 diesel locomotives (1950–1957) based on ALCO S-1 and S-3
- Steam locomotives (1902–1940s) based on American Locomotive Company designs
- Ram tank (1941–1943) as well as recondition of tanks based on M3 Lee from the United States
- Grizzly I cruiser tank (1943–44) for Canadian Army and Portuguese Army based on the M4 Sherman from the United States
- Sexton self-propelled artillery (1943–45) based on M3 Lee from the United States
- Sri Lanka Railways M4 (1975)
- Steam generators for Douglas Point Nuclear Generating Station (1962)

== Notable locomotives built by MLW ==
MLW built several of Canada's most famous locomotives. Most notably, Canadian Pacific 2800 series 4-6-4 Hudson class of locomotives. The 2800s became famous after CPR 2850 pulled the royal train across Canada in 1939. Since then, later 2800s (numbered 2820–2864) are known as Royal Hudsons, with royal permission granted from the king.

From 1968 to 1982 Via Rail operated a TurboTrain passenger service between Toronto and Montreal. The gas-turbine-powered locomotives had been built by Montreal Locomotive Works.

== See also ==
- List of locomotive builders
- List of MLW diesel locomotives
