= List of preserved BC Rail rolling stock =

A large quantity of rolling stock formerly owned and operated by BC Rail, originally the Pacific Great Eastern Railway, have been preserved in museums, on tourist railways, and various other locations all across North America.

== Preserved steam locomotives ==
| Image | Number | Build date | Builder | Wheel arrangement (Whyte notation) | Disposition and location | Notes | References |
|---|---|---|---|---|---|---|---|
| | 2 | February 1910 | Baldwin Locomotive Works | 2-6-2ST | Static display, Railway Museum of British Columbia, Squamish, British Columbia | | |
| | 53 | July 1914 | Canadian Locomotive Company | 2-8-0 | Sunken, Seton Lake, Squamish-Lillooet, British Columbia | Remains lost after plunging into the lake on January 23, 1950. | |
| | 56 | 1914 | Canadian Locomotive Company | 2-8-0 | Sunken, Anderson Lake, Squamish-Lillooet, British Columbia | Crashed into the lake on August 8, 1944, drowning the engineer and fireman. | |

== Preserved diesel locomotives ==
| Image | Number | Build date | Builder | Model | Wheel arrangement | Disposition and location | Notes | References |
|---|---|---|---|---|---|---|---|---|
| | 551 | June 1948 | General Electric | 65-ton | B-B | Static display, Railway Museum of British Columbia, Squamish, British Columbia | Previously MacMillan Bloedel Limited No. 1012. Third diesel locomotive to operate in British Columbia. | |
| | 556 | February 1950 | General Electric | 70-ton | B-B | Operational, BWXT Canada, Cambridge, Ontario | Previously Waterloo Central Railway No. 1556 until being sold to BWXT Canada for switching use. | |
| | 561 | May 1951 | Montreal Locomotive Works | RSC-3m | A1A-A1A | Operational, Railway Museum of British Columbia, Squamish, British Columbia | Originally built with a B-B configuration but modified in 1993. | |
| | 586 | June 1956 | Montreal Locomotive Works | RS-10s | B-B | Static display, Central BC Railway and Forestry Museum, Prince George, British Columbia | | |
| | 631 | January 1966 | American Locomotive Company | C420 | B-B | Operational, Arkansas and Missouri Railroad, Springdale, Arkansas | Sold after being retired in December 2001. Originally Lehigh and Hudson River Railway No. 25. | |
| | 632 | January 1966 | American Locomotive Company | C420 | B-B | Operational, Arkansas and Missouri Railroad, Springdale, Arkansas | Sold after being retired in December 2001. Originally Lehigh and Hudson River Railway No. 26. | |
| | 641 | September 1973 | Montreal Locomotive Works | M420W | B-B | Unoperational, Sartigan Railway, Vallée-Jonction, Quebec | Used for spare parts since acquisition in 2020. Previously Ontario Southland Railway No. 641. | |
| | 642 | September 1973 | Montreal Locomotive Works | M420W | B-B | Operational, Mohawk, Adirondack and Northern Railroad, New York | Currently numbered No. 2042. | |
| | 644 | October 1973 | Montreal Locomotive Works | M420W | B-B | Operational, Sartigan Railway, Vallée-Jonction, Quebec | Currently No. 2044. Previously Ontario Southland Railway No. 644. | |
| | 645 | October 1973 | Montreal Locomotive Works | M420W | B-B | Operational, Mohawk, Adirondack and Northern Railroad, New York | Currently lettered for parent company, Genesee Valley, and numbered No. 2045. Frequently operated in Pennsylvania. | |
| | 646 | October 1973 | Montreal Locomotive Works | M420W | B-B | Operational, Sartigan Railway, Vallée-Jonction, Quebec | Previously Ontario Southland Railway No. 646. | |
| | 647 | October 1973 | Montreal Locomotive Works | M420W | B-B | Operational, Sartigan Railway, Vallée-Jonction, Quebec | Currently No. 2047. Previously Ontario Southland Railway No. 647. | |
| | 705 | December 1970 | Montreal Locomotive Works | M630 | C-C | Operational, Delaware-Lackawanna Railroad, Scranton, Pennsylvania | Repainted as No. 1776 for U.S. Semiquincentennial. Sold to Delaware-Lackawanna as No. 3007. Previously General Electric No. 5000. | |
| | 706 | December 1970 | Montreal Locomotive Works | M630 | C-C | Operational, Delaware-Lackawanna Railroad, Scranton, Pennsylvania | Currently No. 3000. Previously operated by General Electric. | |
| | 4618 | April 1990 | General Electric | C40-8M | C-C | Operational, Alberta Railway Museum, Edmonton, Alberta | | |
| | 6001 | November 1983 | General Motors Diesel | GF6C | C-C | Static display, Central BC Railway and Forestry Museum, Prince George, British Columbia | Donated to the museum in March 2004. | |
| | BC-10 | August 1956 | Budd Company | RDC-1 | 1A-A1 | Unoperational, Idaho Northern and Pacific Railroad, Emmett, Idaho | In storage since excursion operations were ceased in 2016. | |
| | BC-11 | August 1956 | Budd Company | RDC-1 | 1A-A1 | Unoperational, Idaho Northern and Pacific Railroad, Emmett, Idaho | In storage since excursion operations were ceased in 2016. | |
| | BC-14 | December 1962 | Budd Company | RDC-1 | 1A-A1 | Static display, Railway Museum of British Columbia, Squamish, British Columbia | Privately owned. Originally BC-20. | |
| | BC-15 | February 1957 | Budd Company | RDC-1 | 1A-A1 | Operational, Old Colony and Newport Scenic Railway, Aquidneck Island, Rhode Island | Previously Wilton Scenic Railroad No. 15 until 2006. | |
| | BC-21 | December 1962 | Budd Company | RDC-1 | 1A-A1 | Operational, Railway Museum of British Columbia, Squamish, British Columbia | Currently the primary motive power for excursions. | |
| | BC-30 | September 1956 | Budd Company | RDC-3 | 1A-A1 | Operational, Old Colony and Newport Scenic Railway, Aquidneck Island, Rhode Island | Previously Wilton Scenic Railroad No. 30 until 2006. | |
| | BC-31 | July 1956 | Budd Company | RDC-3 | 1A-A1 | Unoperational, Idaho Northern and Pacific Railroad, Emmett, Idaho | In storage since excursion operations were ceased in 2016. | |
| | BC-33 | January 1957 | Budd Company | RDC-3 | 1A-A1 | Static display, Railway Museum of British Columbia, Squamish, British Columbia | | |
| | RCC1 | March 1950 | Electro-Motive Diesel | RCC F7B | B-B | Static display, Central BC Railway and Forestry Museum, Prince George, British Columbia | Previously RCC10 until the original RCC1 was retired. Originally Great Northern Railway No. 454C. | |
