= EMD GM10B =

American electric testbed locomotive

Type and origin
- Power type: Electric
- Builder: GM-EMD
- Serial number: 75607-1
- Model: GM10B
- Build date: August 1976
- Total produced: 1
Specifications
- Configuration
  - AAR: B-B-B
  - UIC: Bo'Bo'Bo'
- Gauge: 4 ft 8 1/2 in (1,435 mm)
- Trucks: ASEA
- Wheel diameter: 50 in (1,270 mm)
- Length: 73 ft 4 in (22.35 m)
- Width: 10 ft 3 1/8 in (3.13 m)
- Height: 15 ft 10 in (4.83 m) (over locked-down pantographs)
- Loco weight: 394,500 lb (178,900 kg)
- Electric system/s: Switchable: 11 kV 25 Hz, 25 kV 60 Hz; Catenary
- Current pickup: Pantograph
- Alternator: EMD D79MA75
- Traction motors: 6 × ASEA LJH108-3
Performance figures
- Power output: 10,000 hp (7.46 MW)
- Tractive effort
  - Starting: 114,000 lbf (510 kN)
  - Continuous: 99,000 lbf (440 kN) at 10 mph (16 km/h), 82,000 lbf (360 kN) at 37 mph (60 km/h)
Career
- Operators: Penn Central (later Conrail)
- Number in class: 1
- Numbers: 1976 (later 4976)
- Locale: Northeast Corridor electrified lines
- Delivered: August 1976
- Withdrawn: 1982
- Disposition: scrapped

The GM10B was an electric testbed locomotive with a power output of 10,000 hp (7.46 MW) which was intended for use on high-speed freight services on the Northeast Corridor. Built by American locomotive builder Electro-Motive Division (EMD) at its La Grange, Illinois, plant in collaboration with ASEA of Sweden. It entered service with Penn Central in August 1976 and featured a B-B-B wheel arrangement, a second for the North American market after the Pennsylvania Railroad class E3b, while having a high proportion of Swedish built components and design features created by ASEA.

== History ==
At the time of its conception in 1976, high oil prices had a number of large US railroads contemplating electrification of their most heavily used lines while at the same time the only major US railroad with freight-hauling electrification, the Penn Central, had a fleet of aging locomotives which were in need of replacement.

As a result, EMD, in conjunction with ASEA, developed the GM10B to provide motive power for high-speed freight trains while at the same time developing the similar GM6C for slow drag freight services. However, after the introduction of the locomotives circumstances changed as the oil prices declined, which wiped out the interest freight railroads had in electrification, all while diesel locomotive power and adhesion were improved.

Meanwhile, the bankruptcy of Penn Central led to the division of the railroad's physical plant between Amtrak, which inherited much of the electrified region, and Conrail. Increased access charges on the part of Amtrak led to Conrail ceasing electric operations in 1982, dismantling the electrification on its lines and avoiding Amtrak-owned rails. Due to this the two locomotives became surplus to operational requirements and were returned to EMD, remaining in the yard at the LaGrange plant until both were scrapped in the mid-1980s.

== See also ==
- EMD GM6C - similar American electric locomotive using a C-C wheel arrangement also by EMD
- GMD GF6C - similar electric locomotive by EMD's Canadian subsidiary
