= EMD GM6C =

Testbed electric locomotive

Type and origin
- Power type: Electric
- Builder: Electro-Motive Division
- Serial number: 75605-1
- Model: GM6C
- Build date: May 1, 1975
- Total produced: 1
Specifications
- Configuration
  - AAR: C-C
  - UIC: Co'Co'
- Gauge: 4 ft 8 1/2 in (1,435 mm)
- Trucks: EMD HTC
- Wheel diameter: 42 in (1,067 mm)
- Length: 68 ft 10 in (20.98 m)
- Width: 10 ft (3.05 m)
- Height: 14 ft 9 1/2 in (4.51 m) (over locked-down pantographs)
- Loco weight: 365,000 lb (165,561 kg) or 182.5 short tons (162.9 long tons; 165.6 t)
- Electric system/s: Switchable: 11 kV 25 Hz, 25 kV 60 Hz, Northeast Corridor Catenary
- Current pickup: Pantograph
- Generator: EMD D79MA75
- Traction motors: 6 × EMD E88X
Performance figures
- Power output: 6,000 hp (4.47 MW)
- Tractive effort: Starting: 126,000 lbf (560.5 kN); Continuous: 44,000 lbf (195.7 kN) @ 46 mph (74 km/h)
Career
- Operators: Penn Central (later Amtrak and Conrail)
- Numbers: 1975 (later 4975)
- Locale: Northeast Corridor
- Disposition: Scrapped

The GM6C was a solitary testbed electric locomotive for freight duties built by General Motors' Electro-Motive Division of the United States in collaboration with ASEA of Sweden. It was rolled out from EMD's La Grange, Illinois plant on May 1, 1975. Equipped with close to standard C-C HTC trucks and traction motors, it was designed for lower-speed drag freight service.

== Motives ==
At the time, high oil prices had a number of large US railroads contemplating electrification of their most heavily used lines, while the only major US railroad with freight-hauling electrification, the Penn Central, had a fleet of aging locomotives needing replacement.

Circumstances changed after the GM6C and GM10B locomotives were developed; oil prices declined, which wiped out the interest freight railroads had in electrification, while diesel locomotive power and adhesion were improved.

Meanwhile, the bankruptcy of Penn Central led to the division of the railroad's physical plant between Amtrak, which inherited much of the electrified region, and Conrail. The two locomotives became surplus to requirements and were returned to EMD, remaining in the LaGrange plant's yard until scrapping in the mid-1980s.

The BC Rail GF6C locomotives used similar technology to the GM6C but had a wide-nose cab and carbody.
