= Central BC Railway and Forestry Museum =

Railway museum in Prince George, British Columbia

Coordinates: 53.9217°N 122.7321°W

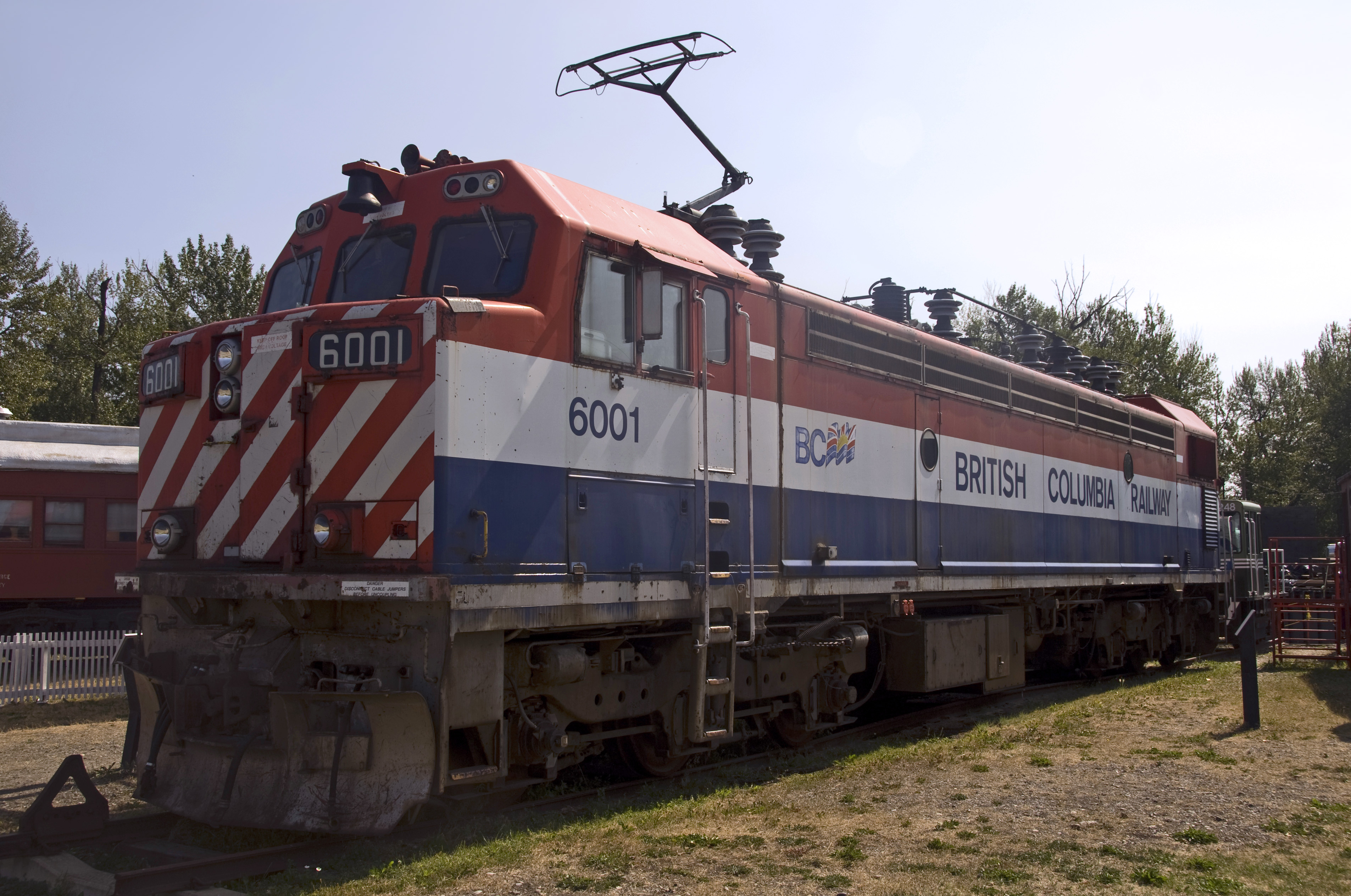
- Established: 20 July 1986
- Location: Prince George, British Columbia Canada
- Type: Railway museum
- Website: pgrfm.bc.ca

The Central BC Railway and Forestry Museum is a railway museum in Prince George, British Columbia. Its collection consists of over sixty pieces of rolling stock (including a 1906 steam locomotive being restored and a GMD GF6C electric locomotive), ten historical buildings and numerous smaller artifacts on an 8-acre (32,000 m^{2}) site. The museum opened on 20 July 1986 and is operated by the Central British Columbia Railway and Forest Industry Museum Society.

In 2025, a vintage Nathan M5 Airchime train horn was stolen from the museum, the third train horn theft it had experienced in the past year.

== History ==
The society which created the museum, the Central British Columbia Railway and Forest Industry Museum Society, was incorporated on 22 March 1983 by six Prince George residents who restored a 1903 wooden snowplough. It originally operated as the Prince George-Nechako-Fraser Division of the Canadian Railroad Historical Association. As the disposal of historic rail equipment was growing, the community recognized the opportunity for a museum. On 5 March 1984, the city granted the association an 8-acre (32,000 m^{2}) site, north of the Canadian National Railway yards. The museum officially opened on 20 July 1986, coinciding with Expo 86 in Vancouver and the 150th anniversary of rail travel in Canada.

== Collection ==
=== Locomotives ===
Locomotive details
| Number | Image | Type | Model | Built | Builder | Status | Former owner |
|---|---|---|---|---|---|---|---|
| 101 | | Diesel | 44-Ton | 1943 | General Electric | Display | Northwood Pulp and Timber |
| 248 | | Diesel | 25-Ton | 1948 | General Electric | Display | Diamond Match Company |
| 586 | | Diesel | RS-10s | 1956 | Montreal Locomotive Works | Display | British Columbia Railway |
| 1520 | | Steam | 4-6-0 | 1906 | Canadian Locomotive Company | Display | Canadian National Railway |
| 1990 | | Diesel | 65-Ton | 1943 | Atlas Car and Manufacturing | Operational | Canadian Forest Products |
| 6001 | | Diesel | GF6C | 1983 | General Motors Diesel | Display | British Columbia Railway |
| 7817 | | Diesel | 70-Ton | 1950 | General Electric | Display | Canadian National Railway |
| 9169 | | Diesel | FP7Au | 1951 | General Motors Diesel | Display | Canadian National Railway |
| RCC1 | | Diesel | Remote control | 1950 | Electro-Motive Diesel | Display | British Columbia Railway |

== See also ==
- List of heritage railways in Canada
