= Milford-Bennington Railroad =

Shortline railroad in New Hampshire

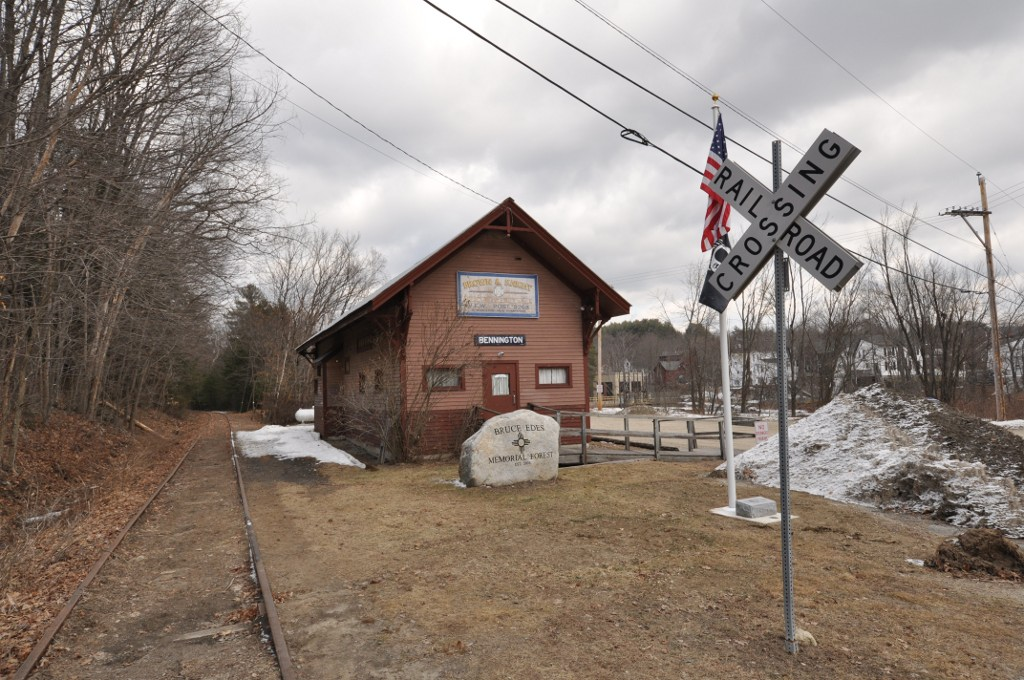
- Near the end of the line in Bennington, NH

Overview
- Headquarters: Wilton, New Hampshire
- Reporting mark: MBRX
- Dates of operation: 1987–present
- Predecessor: Boston and Maine Railroad

Technical
- Length: 18.6 miles (29.9 km)

The Milford-Bennington Railroad, founded in 1987, is a shortline railroad in New Hampshire, United States. The company primarily hauls gravel, sand, and aggregates. The railroad operates 18.6 miles (29.9 km) of track owned by the State of New Hampshire between Bennington and Wilton, and has trackage rights over 5.4 miles (8.7 km) of connecting CSX Transportation trackage to Milford, New Hampshire.

== History ==
The railroad was founded in 1987, but did not run its first train until 1992 when an agreement with Guilford Transportation for trackage rights between Wilton and Milford was reached.

In the 2010s, the company had a dispute with Pan Am Railways over its trackage rights, with Pan Am attempting in 2018 to forcibly discontinue the Milford-Bennington Railroad's access to Milford when the agreement expired. Pan Am proposed that Milford-Bennington instead transfer traffic to it in Wilton, with Pan Am hauling traffic the remaining distance to Milford. Granite State, the company which ships gravel via the railroad, said that this proposal would impact its operations negatively by delaying shipments. In October 2018, the Surface Transportation Board ordered Pan Am to allow Milford-Bennington to continue to use its tracks, which it uses to deliver gravel to a customer in Milford. CSX Transportation took over from Pan Am Railways on June 1, 2023.

The railroad reported on its 30th anniversary in 2022 that it has hauled over 60,000 carloads of stone since starting operations in 1992.

In 2020, the Nashua Regional Planning Commission proposed adding a trail with rail between Wilton and Nashua, part of which would be adjacent to the Milford-Bennington Railroad's right of way. The company was cautiously supportive of the proposal at the time.

=== Tourist train ===
A tourist train, known as the Wilton Scenic Railroad, operated along the Milford-Bennington Railroad between 2003 and 2006, but ceased operations when its owner died. Peter Leishman, owner of the Milford-Bennington Railroad, expressed interest in reviving the tourist train in 2018, but as of 2021 nothing has been announced.

== Operations ==
The railroad operates between April and November each year, and ships stone to the Granite State Concrete Company in Milford.
