= Atlas Car and Manufacturing Company =

The Atlas Car and Manufacturing Company was a manufacturer of small railroad locomotives. The company was based in Cleveland, OH, building equipment from 1896 through the 1980s.

== Overview ==
Atlas specialized in the building of small locomotives and purpose built rail borne equipment for industrial use. The equipment it manufactured rarely ran on the rails of Class I railroads, but were often used to shuttle freight cars around inside manufacturing plants. Atlas's products ranged from small 2-ton end cab switchers up to 65-ton center cab switchers. They also built a wide variety of equipment for the steel industry including blast furnace transfer cars, scale cars, coke quench cars, coke quench locomotives (to 75 tons), furnace cars and self-propelled flatcars. While most equipment was built for steel and coke plants within the United States, some equipment was shipped outside the country (for example 5 scale cars to Russia).

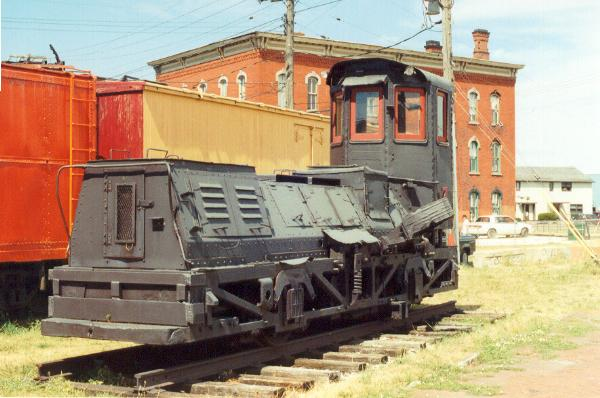
An Atlas-built electric switching locomotive is preserved at the Lake Shore Railway Museum.
