= Sartigan Railway =

Railway in Quebec

- Chemin de fer Sartigan

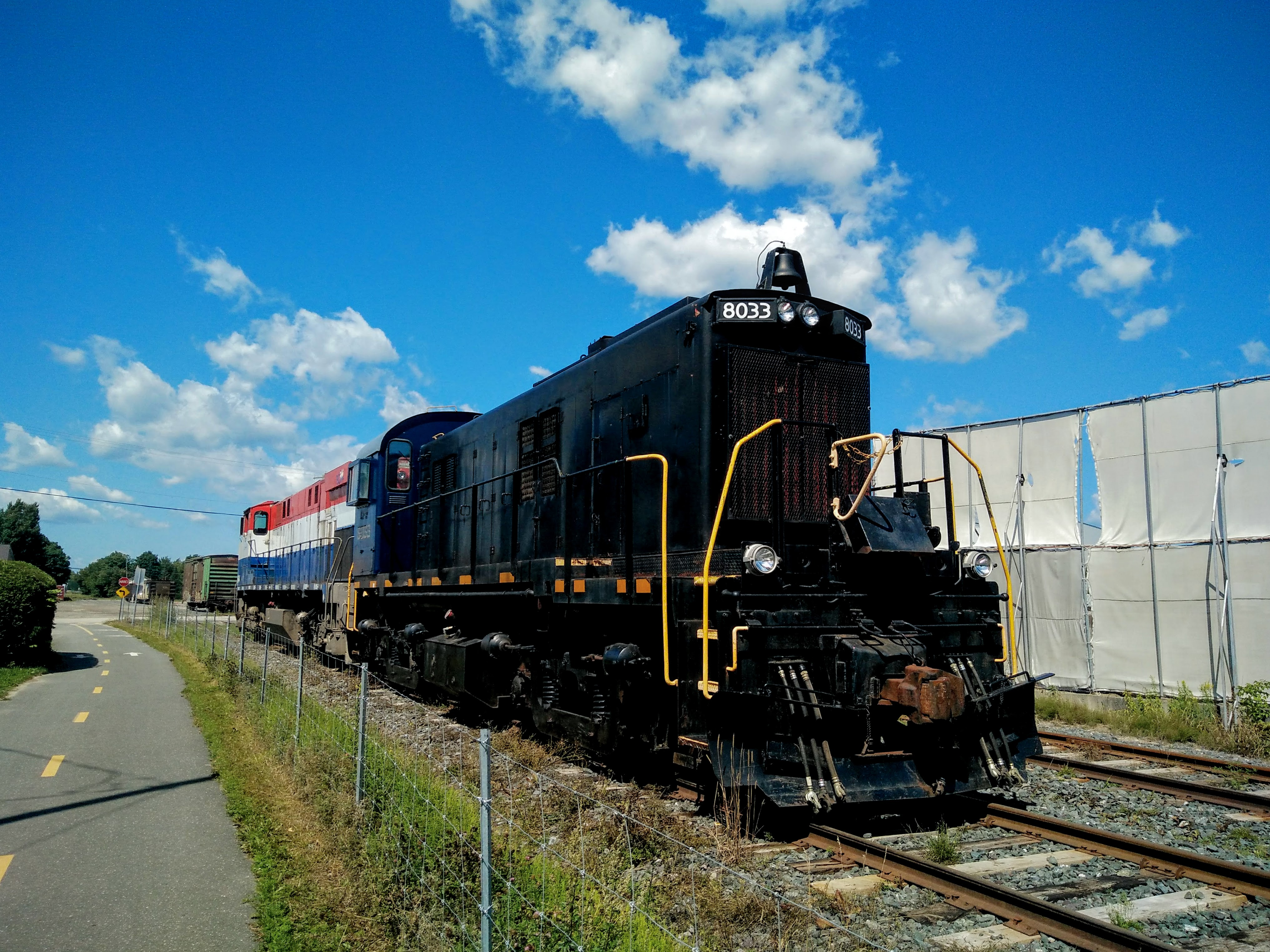
- Engine 8033, a rebuilt MLW RS-23 locomotive, in Scott, Quebec

Overview
- Main region: Chaudière-Appalaches
- Headquarters: Vallée-Jonction, Quebec, Canada
- Reporting mark: CFS
- Dates of operation: 2012–
- Predecessor: Quebec Central Railway

Technical
- Track gauge: 1,435 mm (4 ft 8 1/2 in) standard gauge

Other
- Website: chemindefersartigan.ca

The Sartigan Railway (French: Chemin de fer Sartigan) is a short-line railway operating on the Quebec Central Railway line, owned by the Ministry of Transportation of Quebec, between Lévis and Vallée-Jonction since 2012. It connects with the Canadian National (CN) at its Joffre Yard situated in Charny.

The railway previously operated as a tourist train beginning in 1993, and ended operations in 2005.

Sartigan Railway also operates transshipment sites with its partner Logibel in Scott and Saint-Lambert-de-Lauzon

== History ==
The Sartigan Railway began operations in 2012 along the line between Scott and Charny, which had last been operated by the second incarnation of the Quebec Central Railway in 2006. The Quebec government purchased the line following Quebec Central's failure, and the Sartigan Railway was designated as the new operator.

Reopening of the line between Vallée-Jonction and Thetford Mines is underway as of 2025, with completion expected in 2026.

== Operations ==
As of 2025, the railroad exclusively operates Montreal Locomotive Works products, including 4 MLW M-420Ws, an MLW RS-18u, an MLW RS-23, and an MLW M-636. The railroad's owners prefer using MLW locomotives as they have found them more reliable than modern locomotives.
