= Newport and Narragansett Bay Railroad =

Heritage railroad in Rhode Island

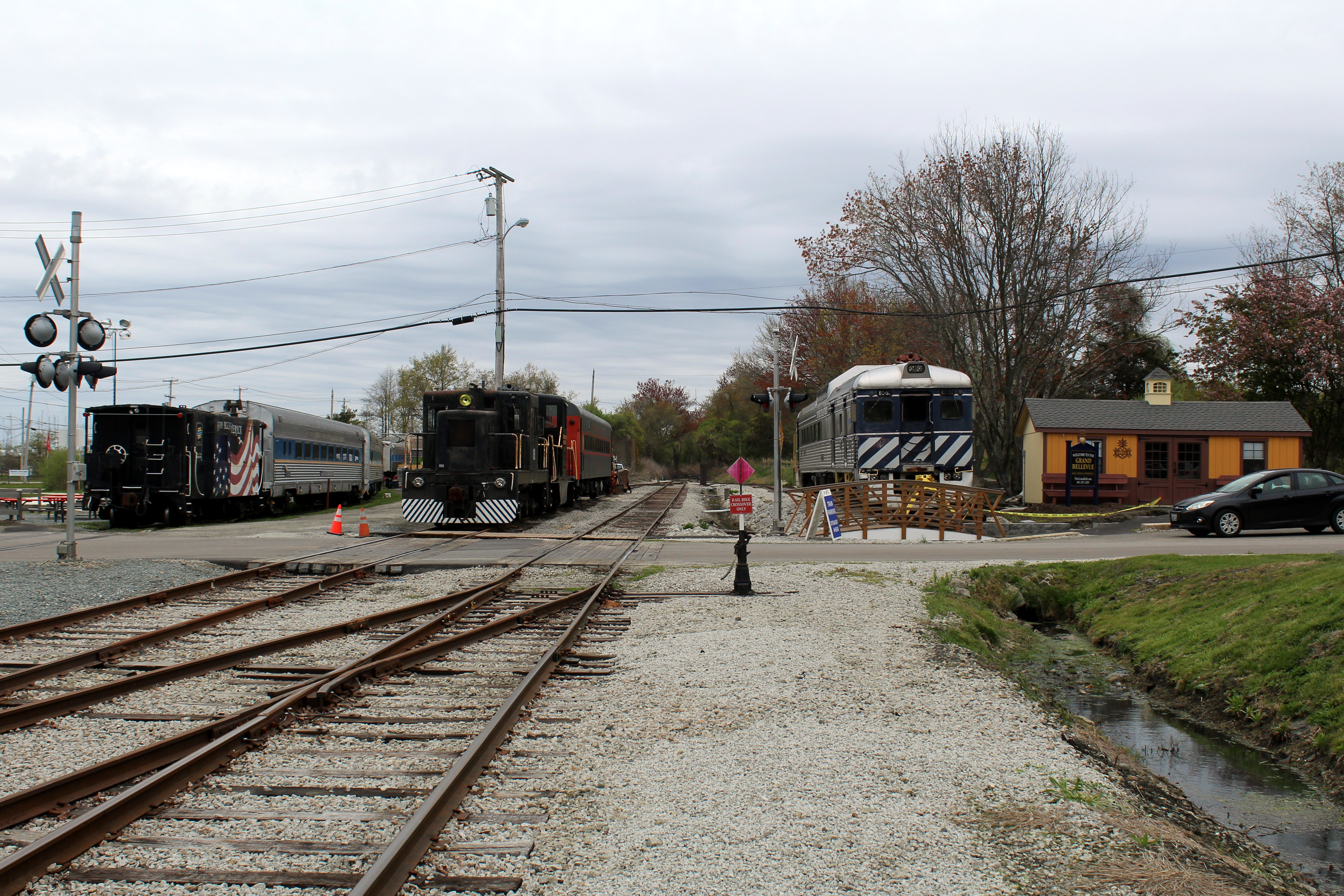
- The railroad's yard in Melville, Rhode Island

Overview
- Headquarters: North Kingstown, Rhode Island
- Locale: Newport County, Rhode Island, USA
- Dates of operation: 1979 (Old Colony and Newport Scenic Railway); 1997 (Newport Dinner Train); 2014 (as Newport and Narragansett Bay Railroad)–present

Technical
- Track gauge: 4 ft 8 1/2 in (1,435 mm) standard gauge

Other
- Website: trainsri.com

The Newport and Narragansett Bay Railroad is a heritage railroad that operates along the Newport Secondary located on Aquidneck Island, Rhode Island. It was formed in 2014–15 from the merger of the for-profit Newport Dinner Train and the nonprofit Old Colony and Newport Scenic Railway.

== History ==
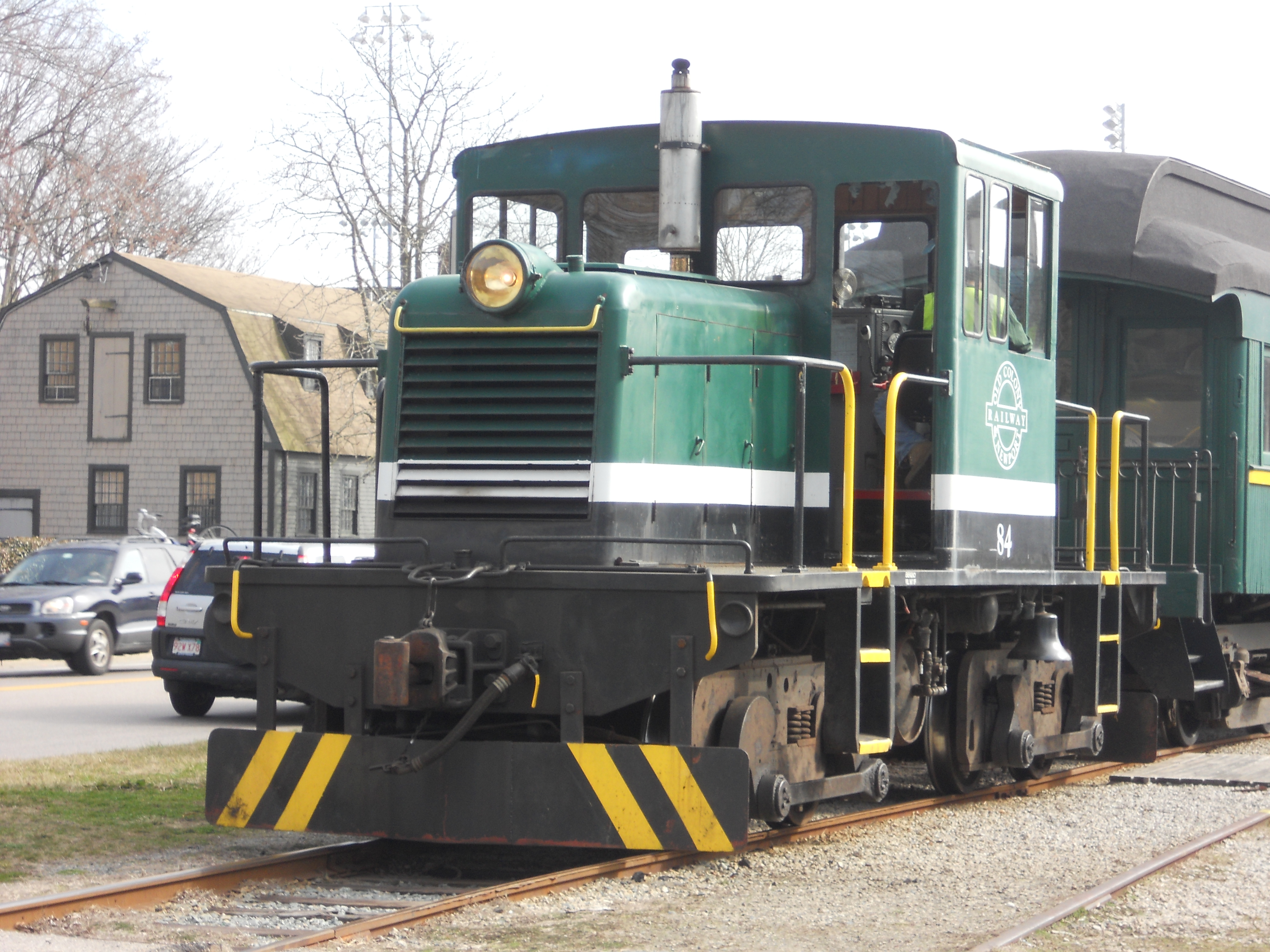
Old Colony and Newport Scenic Railway locomotive #84 in 2012

Scheduled passenger service between Fall River, Massachusetts, and Newport, Rhode Island, on the Newport Secondary ended in 1938, and the New Haven Railroad and its successors never made large profits from freight service on the line. Penn Central attempted to abandon the line in 1973; three years later, Conrail took over the line and sold the southern section to the state. The state in turned leased its section to the nonprofit, volunteer-run Old Colony and Newport Scenic Railway.

The railroad operated with two GE 45-ton switchers (#84 and #4764) and a volunteer-owned Porter-built 50-ton centercab switcher (#7349). Passenger stock included an ex-Boston and Maine Railroad coach (#74) built in 1904 by the Laconia Car Company and an 1884 (?) parlor car (#73) built as an office car for the Intercolonial Railway in the Maritimes of Canada. An ex-Pennsylvania Railroad N5B caboose and an ex-Southern Railway flatcar were used for work equipment.

The Sakonnet River rail bridge was damaged in 1988 and removed in 2007, isolating the line from the national rail network. Despite this, the for-profit Newport Dinner Train began sharing the line in 1997, offering dinner trains and other tourist-based operations. The relationship between the two operators, which had to share the primarily single-track line, was at times rocky.

The Newport Dinner Train began using ex-Branford Steam Railroad GE 44-ton switcher #6 for motive power in 2006; it was brought to the island by a barge. The railroad also owned two dining cars (one ex-Atlantic Coast Line Railroad, the other ex-Pennsylvania Railroad) and an ex-Long Island Railroad parlor car. In October 2006, the railroad purchased two former Wilton Scenic Railroad Budd RDCs.

By early 2013, the dinner train operation was offered for sale. It was sold in November 2014 and rebranded as the Newport and Narragansett Bay Railroad Company. The Old Colony and Newport ceased operations in early 2015 and eventually merged into the Newport and Narragansett Bay. As of 2025, the for-profit Newport and Narragansett Bay Railroad and the nonprofit Old Colony & Newport Scenic Railway operate as two parts of a "merged entity".

== Equipment ==
=== Locomotives ===
Number	Builder	Type	Build date	Status	Notes
6	General Electric	GE 44-ton switcher	1951	Operational	Originally built as General Electric #43 in 1951, it began operating for the Hampton and Branchville Railroad as a freight switcher. The engine was later purchased by the Branford Steam Railroad in North Branford, Connecticut where it worked hauling trap rocks. In 2006, the railroad purchased the engine and it arrived on property on a barge. It was put into service that same year and was renumbered to Newport Dinner Train's #6.
15/30	Budd Company	Budd RDC	1956/1957	Operational	Both units were purchased from the Wilton Scenic Railroad in Wilton, New Hampshire in 2006, they were brought to the island on a barge and began operating for the railroad that same year.

=== Rolling stock ===
- Dining Car Aquidneck Spruce
- Theater Car Atlantic Rose
- Dashing Dan's Clam Car
- Kitchen Bellevue Clipper
