= Wilton Scenic Railroad =

Overview
- Headquarters: Wilton, New Hampshire
- Locale: New England
- Dates of operation: 2003–2006

Technical
- Track gauge: 4 ft 8 1/2 in (1,435 mm) standard gauge
- Length: 13 mi (21 km)

The Wilton Scenic Railroad was a heritage railroad which operated seasonally in southern New Hampshire from spring 2003 through fall 2006. It closed after the death of its owner.

The railroad ran 13 miles (21 km) from Wilton to Greenfield, New Hampshire, using a state-owned rail line that was once part of the Boston and Maine Railroad's Hillsboro Branch. The line is still in limited commercial use, but has not been used for regular passenger service since the 1930s.

== History ==
The railroad opened May 17, 2003, running from Wilton to the former Boston & Maine Railroad railyard in Greenfield, covering the entire route of the Peterboro Railroad which built the line from Wilton to Greenfield in the 1860s. Passengers were allowed to get off and stretch their legs in Greenfield before getting back on the train and heading back to Wilton. On August 23, 2003, the railroad began running almost a mile north of Greenfield to Greenfield State Park.

The Wilton Scenic Railroad had many plans before it ended service in 2006. One was to use the former B&M freight depot in Wilton, built in 1860, as the Wilton Scenic Railroad's depot. Stuart Draper owned the building as a storage unit for his company Draper Energy. It was his dream to renovate the freight depot. The depot never became part of the railroad.

Service was provided by a pair of 800 horsepower (600 kW), diesel engine Budd Rail Diesel Cars, previously used by BC Rail in British Columbia, Canada. Stuart Draper, the railroad's founder, died of a heart attack on January 31, 2006. In October 2006, the railroad's two RDCs were sold to the Newport Dinner Train in Rhode Island.

In March 2018 it was announced that the owner of the Milford-Bennington Railroad (the current freight operator of the rail line), in cooperation with the towns of Wilton and Greenfield, was looking at bringing back the scenic railroad. In October 2018 it was reported that the owner of the railroad had entered into a tentative agreement with an owner of passenger equipment. Pan Am Railways, a regional class II freight carrier, has also expressed interest in bringing back the Wilton Scenic in its first ever attempt at a heritage operation. As of 2025, however, no further announcement has been made about reinstating the service.

== Locomotives ==
Number	Builder	Type	Build date	Notes
15/30	Budd Company	Budd RDC	1956/1957	Both units were sold to the Newport Dinner Train in Rhode Island where they continue to operate today.

== See also ==
- List of heritage railroads in the United States
