= BC Rail =

Railway company in British Columbia, Canada

British Columbia Railway Company
- BC Rail

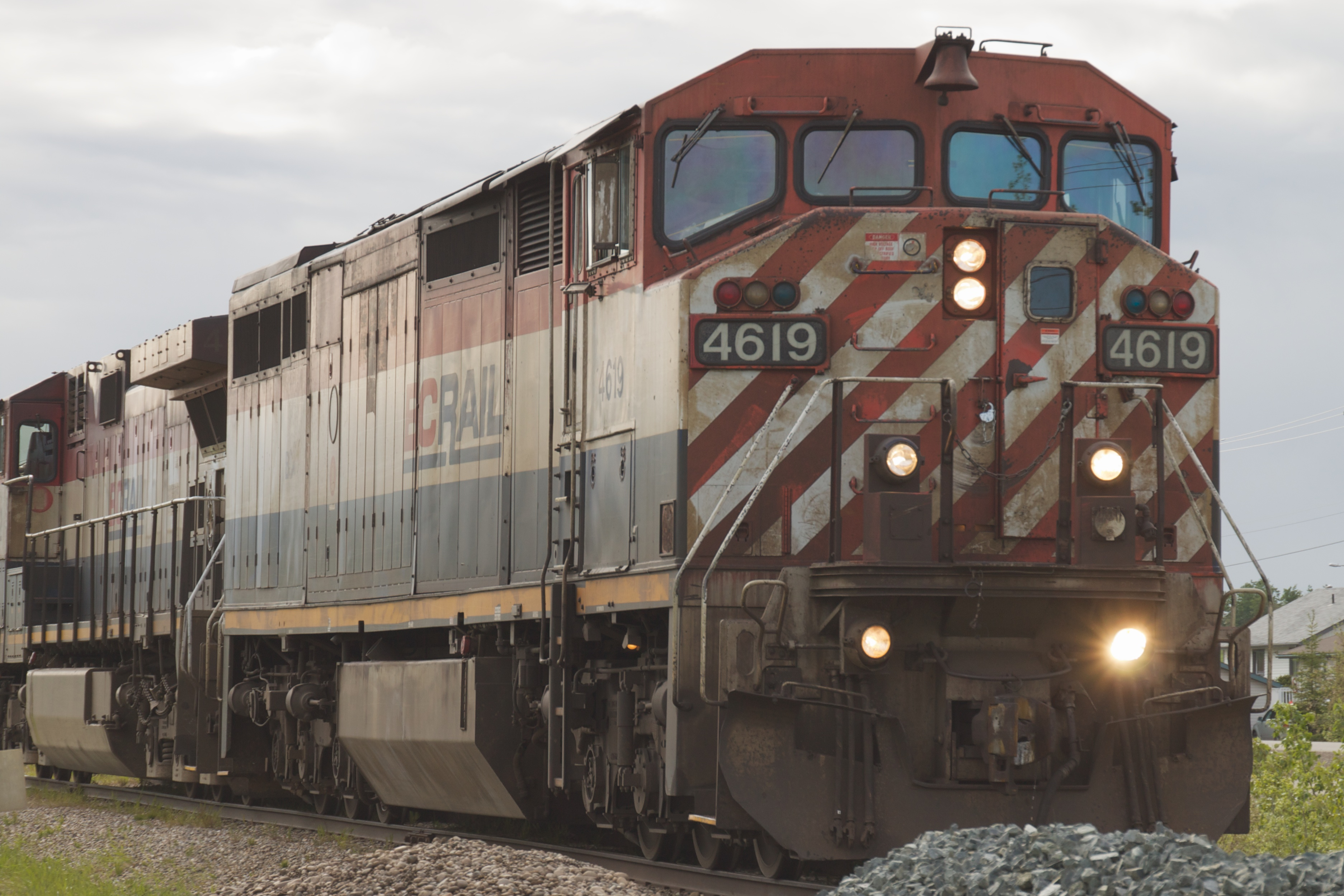

Overview
- Parent company: BC Transportation Financing Authority (Government of British Columbia)
- Headquarters: North Vancouver, British Columbia
- Reporting mark: BCOL, BCIT (formerly PGE)
- Locale: British Columbia
- Dates of operation: February 27, 1912–present
- Successor: Canadian National Railway (under operating lease)

Technical
- Track gauge: 4 ft 8 1/2 in (1,435 mm) standard gauge
- Electrification: 1984–2000 (Tumbler Ridge Subdivision) 50 kV 60 Hz overhead catenary
- Length: 2,320 km (1,440 mi)

Other
- Website: www.bcrco.com

The British Columbia Railway Company (reporting mark BCOL, BCIT), commonly known as BC Rail, is a railway in the Canadian province of British Columbia.

Chartered as a private company in 1912 as the Pacific Great Eastern Railway (PGE), it was acquired by the provincial government in 1918. In 1972 it was renamed to the British Columbia Railway, and in 1984 it took on the BC Rail branding. From 1978 to 2000, BC Rail was highly profitable, posting profits in every year throughout that period.

Until 2004 it operated as the third-largest railway in Canada, providing freight, passenger, and excursion rail services throughout BC on 2,320 km (1,440 mi) of mainline track. It also ran the Royal Hudson services, as well as the premier of British Columbia's private train.

It was designated a Class II Railway until 2004. In 2004, the freight operations (including a vast amount of land, buildings, and all rolling stock) of BC Rail were leased to Canadian National Railway (CN) for an initial period of 60 years, with the exception of the Deltaport Spur, for the price of $550 million.

BC Rail remains an operating Crown corporation today. It retains ownership of the entire right of way stretching from Prince George to North Vancouver, as well as ownership of all assets leased to CN. BC Rail retains significant real estate investments throughout BC, and a 40 km (25 mi) stretch of track from Roberts Bank Superport in Delta to Langley. The planned sale of this 40 km (25 mi) stretch was cancelled after the initial BC Rail scandal.

== History ==
=== 1912–1948 ===
The Pacific Great Eastern Railway (PGE) was incorporated on February 27, 1912, to build a line from Vancouver north to a connection with the Grand Trunk Pacific Railway (GTP) at Prince George. Although independent from the GTP, the PGE had agreed that the GTP, whose western terminus was at the remote northern port of Prince Rupert, could use their line to gain access to Vancouver. The railway was given its name due to a loose association with England's Great Eastern Railway. Its financial backers were Timothy Foley, Patrick Welch, and John Stewart, whose construction firm of Foley, Welch and Stewart was among the leading railway contractors in North America. Upon incorporation, the PGE took over the Howe Sound and Northern Railway, which at that point had built 14 kilometres (9 mi) of track north of Squamish. The British Columbia government gave the railway a guarantee of principal and 4% interest (later increased to 4.5% to make the bonds saleable) on the construction bonds of the railway.

By 1915, the line was opened from Squamish 283 kilometres (176 mi) north to Chasm. The railway was starting to run out of money, however. In 1915 it failed to make an interest payment on its bonds, obliging the provincial government to make good on its bond guarantee. In the 1916 provincial election campaign, the Liberal Party alleged that some of the money advanced to the railway for bond guarantee payments had instead gone into Conservative Party campaign funds. In the election, the Conservatives, who had won 40 of 42 seats in the legislature in the 1912 election, lost to the Liberals. The Liberals then took Foley, Welch and Stewart to court to recover $5 million of allegedly unaccounted funds. In early 1918, the railway's backers agreed to pay the government $1.1 million and turn the railway over to the government.

When the government took over the railway, two separate sections of trackage had been completed: A small 32-kilometre (20 mi) section between North Vancouver and Horseshoe Bay, and one between Squamish and Clinton. By 1921, the provincial government had extended the railway to a point 24 kilometres (15 mi) north of Quesnel, still 130 kilometres (80 mi) south of a connection to Prince George, but it was not extended further. The track north of Quesnel was later removed. Construction of the line between Horseshoe Bay and Squamish was given a low priority because there was already a barge in operation between Squamish and Vancouver, and the railway wanted to discontinue operations on the North Vancouver-Horseshoe Bay line. However, the railway had an agreement with the municipality of West Vancouver to provide passenger service that it was unable to get out of until 1928, when they paid the city $140,000 in support of its road-building programme. The last trains on the line ran on November 29, 1928, and the line fell into disuse, but was never formally abandoned.

For the next 20 years the railway would run from "nowhere to nowhere". It did not connect with any other railway, and there were no large urban centres on its route. It existed mainly to connect logging and mining operations in the British Columbia Interior with the coastal town of Squamish, where resources could then be transported by sea. The government still intended for the railway to reach Prince George, but the resources to do so were not available, especially during the Great Depression and World War II. The unfortunate state of the railway caused it to be given nicknames such as "Province's Great Expense", "Prince George Eventually", "Past God's Endurance", "Please Go Easy", and "Puff, Grunt and Expire".

=== 1949–1971 ===
Pacific Great Eastern Railway logo

Starting in 1949, the Pacific Great Eastern began to expand. Track was laid north of Quesnel to a junction with the Canadian National Railway at Prince George. That line opened on November 1, 1952. Between 1953 and 1956 the PGE constructed a line between Squamish and North Vancouver. The PGE used their former right-of-way between North Vancouver and Horseshoe Bay, to the dismay of some residents of West Vancouver who, mistakenly believing the line was abandoned, had encroached on it. The line opened on August 27, 1956. By 1958 the PGE had reached north from Prince George to Fort St. John and to Dawson Creek where it met the Northern Alberta Railways.

A 1964 PGE passenger timetable cover; Peace River at Taylor.

In 1958, Premier of British Columbia W.A.C. Bennett boasted that he would extend the railway to the Yukon and Alaska, and further extension of the railway was undertaken in the 1960s. A 37-kilometre (23 mi) spur was constructed to Mackenzie in 1966. A third line was extended west from the mainline (somewhat north of Prince George) to Fort St. James. It was completed on August 1, 1968. The largest construction undertaken in the 1960s was to extend the mainline from Fort St. John 400 kilometres (250 mi) north to Fort Nelson, less than 160 kilometres (100 mi) away from the Yukon. The Fort Nelson Subdivision was opened by Premier Bennett on September 10, 1971. Unfortunately, the opening of the line was overshadowed by the inaugural train derailing south of Williams Lake, south of Prince George.

=== 1972–1989 ===
The railway underwent two changes of name during this time period. In 1972, the railway's name was changed to the British Columbia Railway (BCR). In 1984, the BCR was restructured. Under the new organization, BC Rail Ltd. was formed, owned jointly by the British Columbia Railway Company (BCRC) and by a BCRC subsidiary, BCR Properties Ltd. The rail operations became known as BC Rail.

In 1973, the British Columbia government acquired and restored an ex-Canadian Pacific Railway 4-6-4 steam locomotive of the type known as "Royal Hudsons", a name that King George VI permitted the class to be called after the Canadian Pacific Railway used one on the royal train in 1939. The locomotive that the government acquired, numbered 2860, was built in 1940 and was the first one built as a Royal Hudson. The government then leased it, along with ex-Canadian Pacific 2-8-0 #3716 to the British Columbia Railway, which started excursion service with the locomotive between North Vancouver and Squamish on June 20, 1974. The train ran between June and September on Wednesdays through Sundays from 1974 to 2001. During this time, the Royal Hudson Steam Train was the only regularly scheduled, mainline steam operation on a Class 1 railroad in North America.

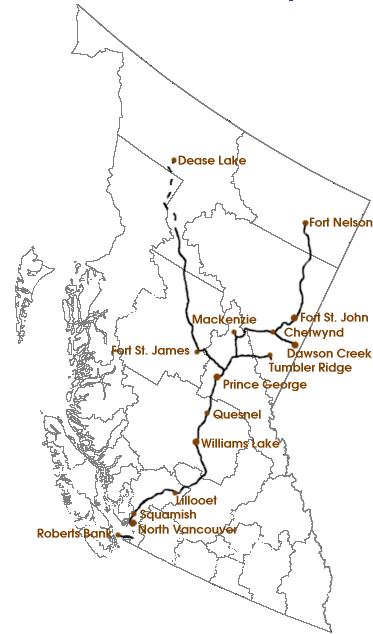
Map of the British Columbia Railway

In the 1960s, a new line had been projected to run northwest from Fort St. James to Dease Lake, 663 kilometres (412 mi) away. On October 15, 1973, the first 201 kilometres (125 mi) of the extension to Lovell (lat 55°33′, long 126°2′) were opened. The cost of the line was significantly greater than what was estimated, however. Contractors working on the remainder of the line alleged that the railway had misled them regarding the amount of work required so that it could obtain low bids, and took the railway to court.

The Dease Lake line was starting to appear increasingly uneconomical. There was a world decline in the demand for asbestos and copper, two main commodities that would be hauled over the line. As well, the Cassiar Highway that already served Dease Lake had recently been upgraded. Combined with the increasing construction costs, the Dease Lake line could no longer be justified. Construction stopped on April 5, 1977. Track had been laid to Jackson Creek (lat 56°50, long 128°12′), 423 kilometres (263 mi) past Fort St. James, and clearing and grading were in progress on the rest of the extension. It had cost $168 million to that point, well over twice the initial estimate. The trackbed can be seen on Google Earth all the way to Dease Lake, via the small towns of Leo Creek (lat 55°3′, long 125°33′) and Takla Landing (lat 55°29′, long 125°58′).

The management and operation of the railway had been called into question, and on February 7, 1977, the provincial government appointed a Royal Commission, the McKenzie Royal Commission, to investigate the railway. Its recommendations were released on August 25, 1978. It recommended that construction not continue on the 240 kilometres (149 mi) of roadbed between Dease Lake and the current end of track, and that trains be terminated at Driftwood (approx. lat 55°42, long 126°15′), 32 kilometres (20 mi) past Lovell. The rest of the track would be left in place but not used. In 1983, after logging operations ceased at Driftwood and traffic declined sharply, the Dease Lake line was closed. However, it was reopened in 1991 and, as of 2005, extends to a point called Minaret Creek, British Columbia (lat 56°20′, long 127°17′), still over 282 kilometres (175 mi) south of Dease Lake. Many of the commission's other recommendations, including the abandonment of the Fort Nelson line, and discontinuation of uneconomic operations such as passenger services, were not followed.

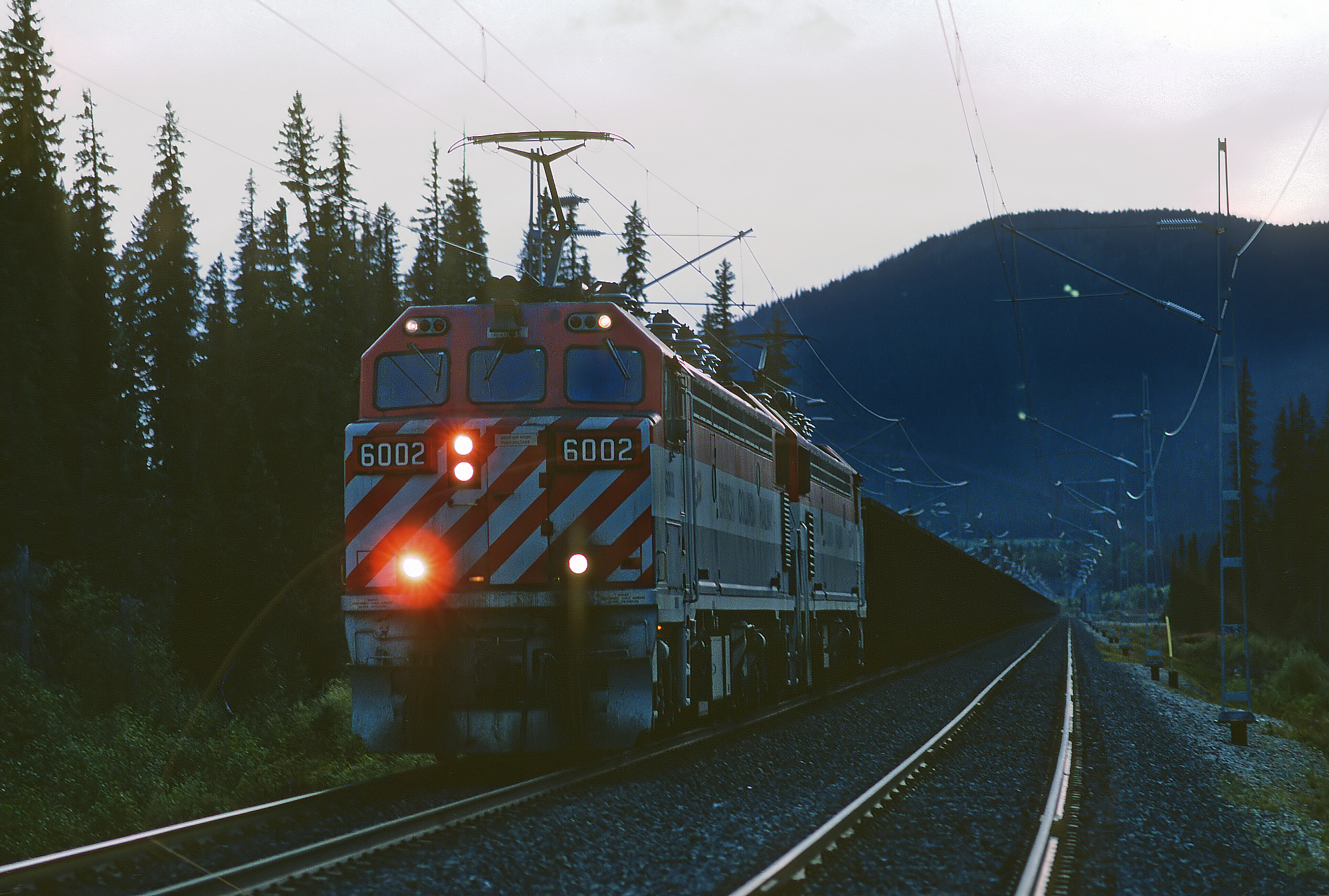
Two GMD GF6C electric locomotives lead a coal train on the Tumbler Ridge Subdivision in 1987.

In the early 1980s the railway built a new line and acquired another. The Tumbler Ridge Subdivision, a 132-kilometre (82 mi) electrified branch line, opened in 1983 to the Quintette and Bullmoose mines, two coal mines northeast of Prince George that produced coal for Japan. It has the lowest crossing of the Rocky Mountains by a railway, at 1,163 metres (3,815 ft). There are two large tunnels under the mountains: The Table Tunnel, 9.0 kilometres (5.6 mi) long, and the Wolverine Tunnel, 6.0 kilometres (3.7 mi) long. Electrified owing to the long tunnels and close proximity to the W. A. C. Bennett Dam and transmission lines, it was one of the few electrified freight lines in North America. Although initially profitable, the traffic on the line was never as high as initially predicted, and by the 1990s was under one train per day. The railway had incurred much debt building the branch line, and the expensive, unprofitable operations on the branch line could not help to repay that debt. In 1984, BC Rail acquired the British Columbia Harbours Board Railway, a 37-kilometre (23 mi) line that connects three class I railways with Roberts Bank, an ocean terminal that handles coal shipments. Since the line had been constructed in 1969, it had been leased to the CPR, Burlington Northern Railroad, and Canadian National Railway in succession.

=== 1990–2003 ===
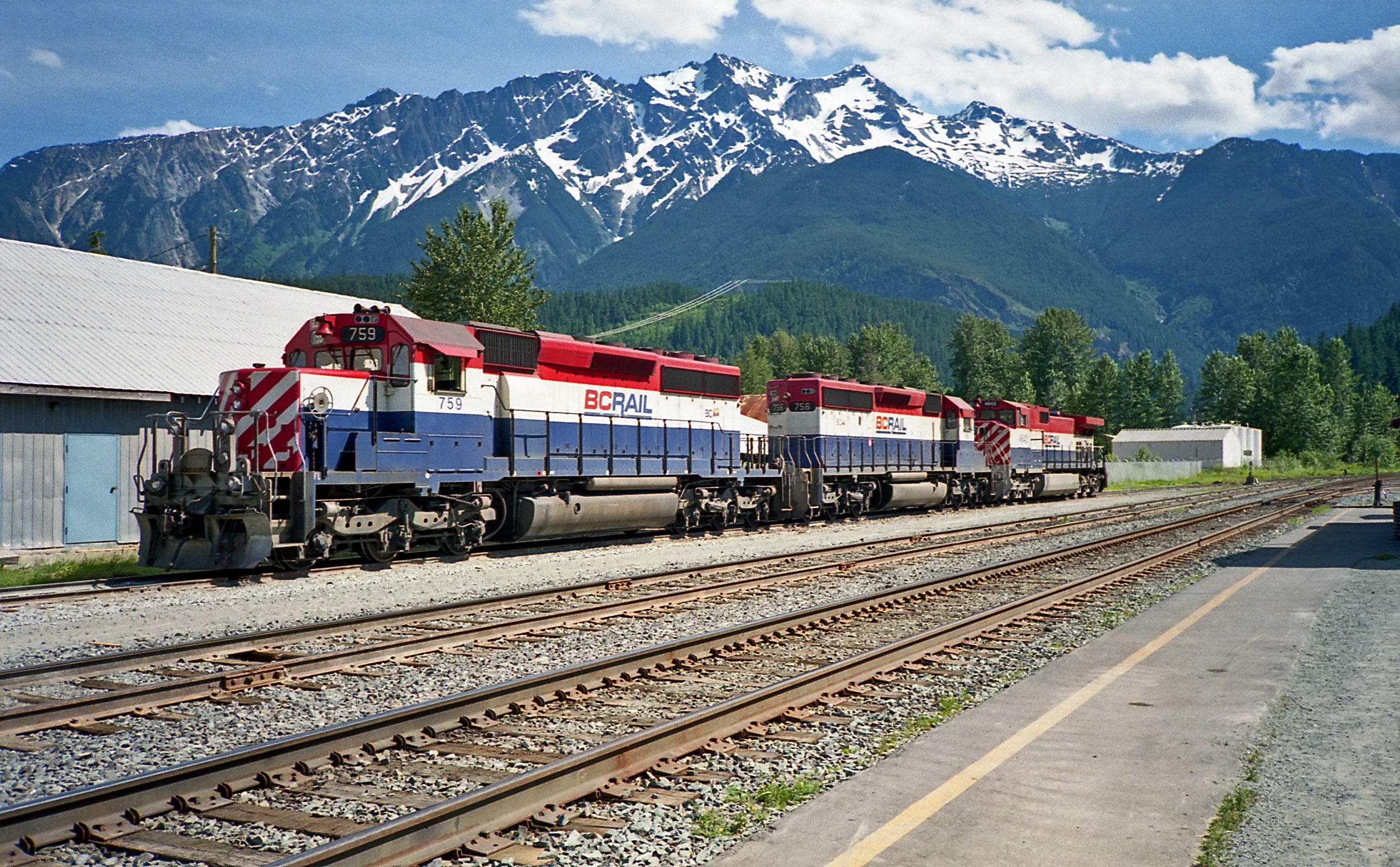
Two SD40-2s and a GE C44-9WL at Pemberton in 1995

In the early 1990s, the provincial government reduced subsidies to BC Rail. As a result, BC Rail, burdened with several money-losing services that it was required to operate, saw its debtload grow more than sixfold between 1991 and 2001.

In the 1990s, BC Rail branched out into shipping operations, acquiring terminal operator Vancouver Wharves in 1993 and Canadian Stevedoring and its subsidiary, Casco Terminals, in 1998. In 1999 these operations became the three operating divisions of a new entity, BCR Marine. BCR Group became the parent company of both BCR Marine and BC Rail. In early 2003, attempting to reduce the railway's large debt, BCR Group sold its BCR Marine assets except for Vancouver Wharves (which was also not included in the subsequent sale of BC Rail to Canadian National, and remains a provincial Crown corporation).

On August 19, 2000, the Quintette mine closed, and the portion of the Tumbler Ridge Subdivision between Teck and Quintette, British Columbia, was abandoned. The last electric locomotives ran along the line on September 29, 2000, after which the line was worked by diesel locomotives. The Bullmoose mine closed on April 10, 2003, after which the remaining 112.0 kilometres (69.6 mi) of the Tumbler Ridge Subdivision between Teck and Wakely was abandoned, although the track is still in place. The electric locomotives were shipped south to Tacoma, Washington, where they are being dismantled by CEECO Rail Services. One of the locomotives (6001) was purchased by the Paul D. Roy family and they donated it to the Prince George Railway and Forestry Museum in Prince George where it is being preserved.

Several other services were also discontinued around this time. The Royal Hudson steam train excursion was discontinued at the end of the 2001 excursion season. The 2860 was out of service in 2000, needing extensive repairs. The backup steam locomotive, a 2-8-0 locomotive built for the Canadian Pacific Railway in 1912, broke down in May 2001, and for the rest of the season BC Rail used a former Canadian Pacific Railway FP7A diesel locomotive #4069 that it had leased from the West Coast Railway Association in Squamish.

Passenger train service, which consisted of the Budd-RDC operated Cariboo Prospector and Whistler Northwind (Pacific starlight dinner train) trains, ended October 31, 2002. The service was unprofitable, allegedly owing to BC Rail's heavy dependence on their fleet of aging Budd Rail Diesel Cars (RDC), which were becoming increasingly expensive to keep in service. The RDCs have since been sold to various museums and operators around North America, such as the Wilton Scenic Railroad in New Hampshire and the West Coast Railway Association in Squamish.

Service between Seton Portage and Lillooet was replaced by a railbus. As well, around this time BC Rail ended its intermodal service.

=== Lease to CN ===
On May 13, 2003, BC Premier Gordon Campbell announced that the government would sell the operations of the railway (including all assets other than the rail right-of-way). During the previous election, he had promised not to sell the railway, and said that he was keeping this promise by retaining ownership of the right-of-way and only leasing the land to the operator. On November 25, Canadian National's (CN) bid of $1 billion was accepted over those of several other companies, including the Canadian Pacific Railway, the BNSF Railway, and OmniTRAX. The transaction was closed on July 15, 2004. The lease of the rail right-of-way is for 60 years with a 30-year option to renew. At the renewal date, the BC government will have the option of buying back all the assets from CN. Conversely, as of July 15, 2009, the fifth anniversary of the contract, CN has the right to decommission any part of the line, but upon doing so the land reverts to the Crown, though the Crown can sell it back to CN for $1.

The one portion of the BC Rail line not included in the sale was the Port Subdivision from Roberts Bank connecting to the main CN, CPR and BNSF lines. Originally the operation of this line was to be sold separately. However, irregularities came up during the sale process including a government employee, David Basi, being accused of accepting a bribe from a lobbyist, Erik Bornmann, working on behalf of OmniTRAX, who turned Crown witness in exchange for conditional amnesty, which enabled the RCMP to charge Basi. Another irregularity was that CPR withdrew their bid because CN had access to secret government information, including confidential information on their own corporate operations. The sale of the spur line was cancelled, and the remnants of BC Rail Company continues to operate and maintain this line.

The lease contract did not include the sale of BC Rail's assets, including the land and rights-of-way. As well, passenger rights were not included. The contract requires CN to yield trackage to any private operator who requests it for the purposes of carrying passengers on commercially reasonable terms.

As per the terms of the lease, CN holds the sole right to renew the contract for up to 999 years through a series of options. The lease also allows for BC Rail to give CN title to any and all of the railway for the nominal price of $1. The lease was the subject of the biggest political scandal in BC history resulting in the BC Legislature Raids. The BC Liberal government was accused of lying about the state of BC Rail's debts and viability in order to justify the deal with CN, claiming the railway was in disarray. Canadian Pacific, a rival bidder, privately stated in since-released communications that the bid was "rigged".

In 2010, two BC Liberal Party ministerial aides pleaded guilty to charges of breach of trust and receiving a benefit for leaking information about the BC Rail leasing process, with both being sentenced to two years less a day of house arrest and 150 hours of community service.

=== CN era (2004–present) ===
On August 5, 2005, a 144-car CN train heading inland from Brackendale, derailed spilling eight empty lumber flat cars and one tank car of sodium hydroxide. The tank car spilled sodium hydroxide into the Cheakamus River, killing most of its fish.

Moran is a railway point on the BC Rail line north of Pavilion, British Columbia. The location, which is high on the side of the stretch of the Fraser Canyon known as Moran Canyon, is notable as the site of the proposed Moran Dam. At Moran, on June 29, 2006, a diesel locomotive hauling one flatcar of lumber down the steep Pavilion grade 29 km (18 mi) north of Lillooet had its air brakes fail. The train gathered speed until it derailed over a steep gravelly slope; two of the three crew members were killed.

In late March 2020, CN announced that it planned on abolishing through freight on the Lillooet Subdivision, between Williams Lake and Lillooet; as well as on the Squamish Sub, between Lillooet and Squamish. With some mills already curtailing operations and a further slowdown expected due to the emerging COVID-19 pandemic, on-line traffic did not warrant use of the 436 km (271 mi) section of railway, which runs through treacherous and maintenance-intensive territory. On April 7, the last regularly scheduled freight train arrived at the yard in Squamish. The remaining traffic in Williams Lake and points north now moves to the Greater Vancouver area via Prince George and the CN mainline. On the Squamish Subdivision, CN reportedly provided service to Continental Log homes in Mount Currie, and continues to use the line for railcar storage. The Rocky Mountaineer luxury railtour sightseeing train continued to operate during the summer, as the only remaining through train on the line.

=== Planned CN withdrawal from BC Rail (2025–present) ===
On July 11, 2025, CN announced plans to abandon the route. This raised the possibility of the BC government terminating the freight operations lease and simultaneously relaunching passenger service, according to Patrick Weiler, the member of Parliament for that region.

In May 2026, Rocky Mountaineer announced that as a result of CN planning on withdrawing service on BC Rail trackage, its Rainforest to Gold Rush route, which operated on BC Rail, will be discontinued at the end of the 2026 season.

Meanwhile, that April, American short-line operator Columbia Rail, which already operates 480 kilometres (300 mi) in Washington, Oregon, and Idaho, stated its intention to take over 344 kilometres (214 mi) of BC Rail tracks from Brackendale to Exeter, near 100 Mile House. On July 14, Columbia Rail confirmed its intention to take over the line. Several local governments along the route, as well as the B.C. Rail Corridor Alliance, had been pushing for upgrades to the line, as well as returning passenger service between northern British Columbia and the Lower Mainland.

== Freight services ==
The railway transported a wide variety of products, from resource traffic to intermodal freight. Forest products were one of the main products transported by the railway. Before the lease of operations to CN, the railway transported over 120,000 carloads of lumber, pulp, woodchips, and other forest products per year. The railway served several lumber and pulp mills in the province. Between 1983 and 2003, the railway hauled coal in unit trains from the Teck and Quintette mines near Tumbler Ridge to Prince George, from where CN would haul the trains to Prince Rupert for shipment to Japan. The Quintette mine, the larger-producing of the two, closed in 2000 and the Teck mine closed in 2003.

Starting in the 1960s, the PGE operated an intermodal service that transported truck trailers between North Vancouver and Prince George, and to places further north. Unlike most of the railway's other traffic, most of the intermodal traffic was northbound. In April 1982, the railway combined its piggyback and less-than-carload (LCL) services to form a new Intermodal Services Department. BC Rail halted its intermodal services in 2002. Starting in 1958, the railway started to haul grain from the Peace River District, serving grain elevators at Dawson Creek, Buick, Fort St. John, and Taylor. With an amendment to the Western Grain Transportation Act in 1985 that included the railway in the act, it became economical for the railway to transport grain, and it also carried grain from Northern Alberta bound for Prince Rupert, interchanging with CN at Dawson Creek and Prince George.

From the 1920s to the 1960s, the railway also carried gold concentrate and bullion from the Bridge River goldfield towns of Bralorne and Pioneer Mine, which were trucked out of the goldfield area over the 1,100-metre-high (3,500 ft) Mission Pass to the railway at Shalalth. The main freight company operating out of Shalalth was Evans Transportation Co., which grew to be one of the biggest transportation companies in the province. In addition to gold concentrate and ore, Evans and other companies based in Shalalth carried passengers, heavy equipment, and supplies of all kinds over the Mission Pass.

=== Interchanges ===
Between 1928 and 1952, the PGE interchanges were difficult—at Squamish there was a barge connection to North Vancouver and the rest of the North American railroads; after 1952 the PGE could connect with CN at Prince George. Connections were made to other railways when the railway completed its Howe Sound link in 1956. The main connection to the North American rail network was in North Vancouver, where there was a connection to CN. There was also a rail connection to deep-sea terminal operator Vancouver Wharves, and some interchange occurred with the Union Pacific Railroad through the Seaspan railbarge link between North Vancouver and Seattle, Washington. The railway also interchanged with CN at Prince George, and with Northern Alberta Railways (acquired by CN in 1981) at Dawson Creek. CN's line between Dawson Creek, British Columbia, and Hythe, Alberta, fell into disuse in 1998, but CN agreed to reopen it as a condition of purchasing BC Rail. However, as of 2010 the line between Dawson Creek and Hythe is still disused.

=== Reporting marks ===
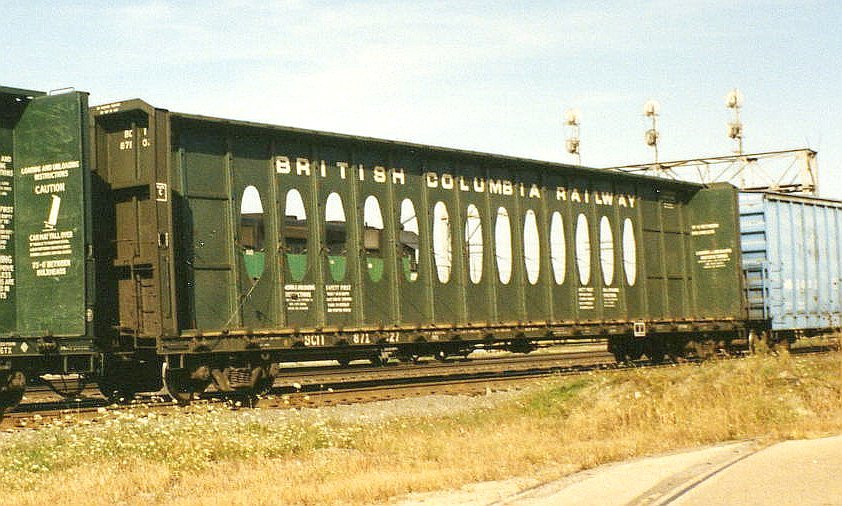
BCIT 871027 in interchange service on the Burlington Northern in 1992

Reporting marks are a system intended to help keep track of rolling stock and financial transactions between railways. The Pacific Great Eastern Railway used the reporting mark PGE. It later adopted the reporting mark PGER in 1971 for freight cars in international service. When the railway was renamed to the British Columbia Railway, it adopted the reporting mark BCOL with the reporting mark BCIT replacing PGER for international service cars.

== Passenger services ==
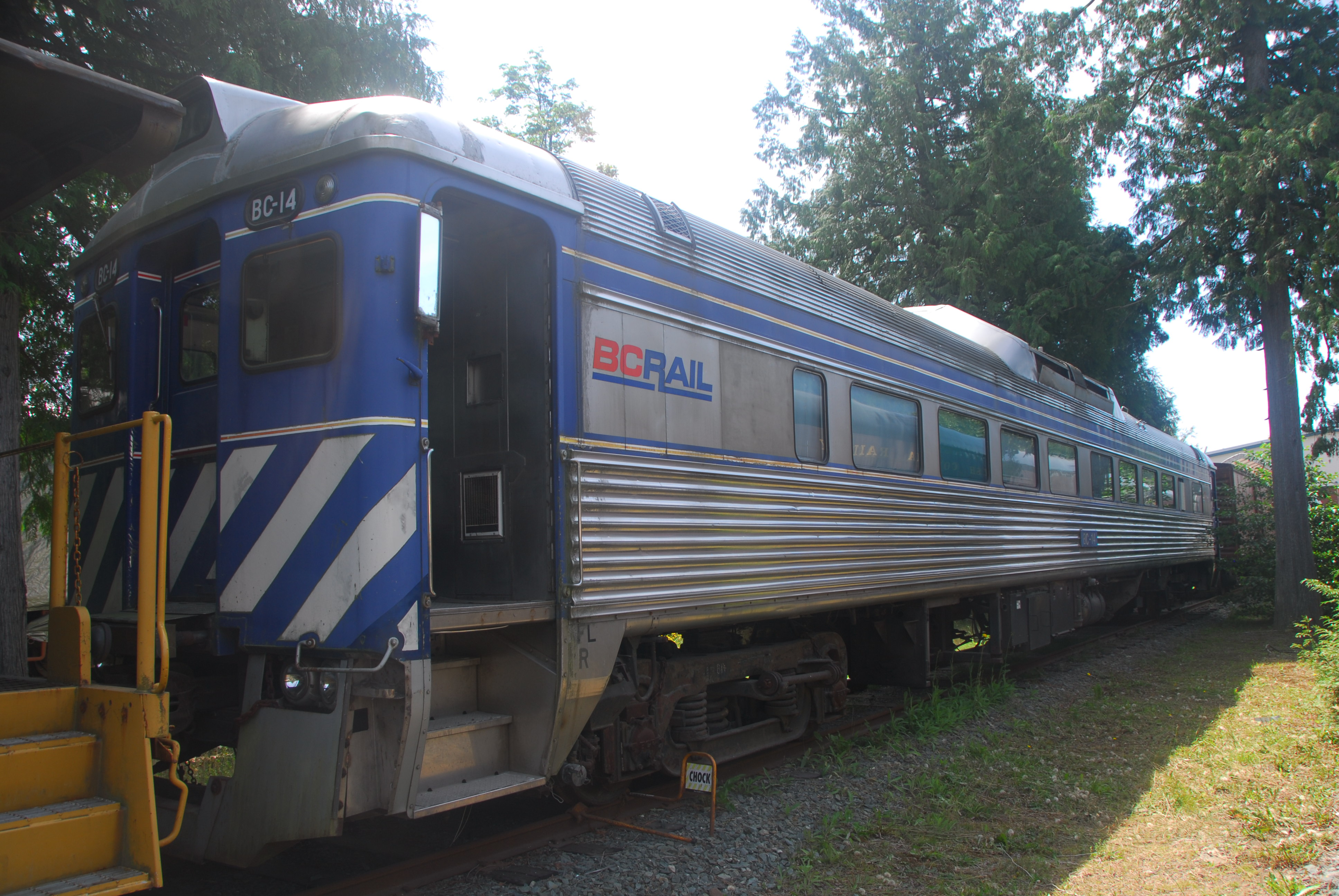
BC Rail Budd Rail Diesel Car (RDC)

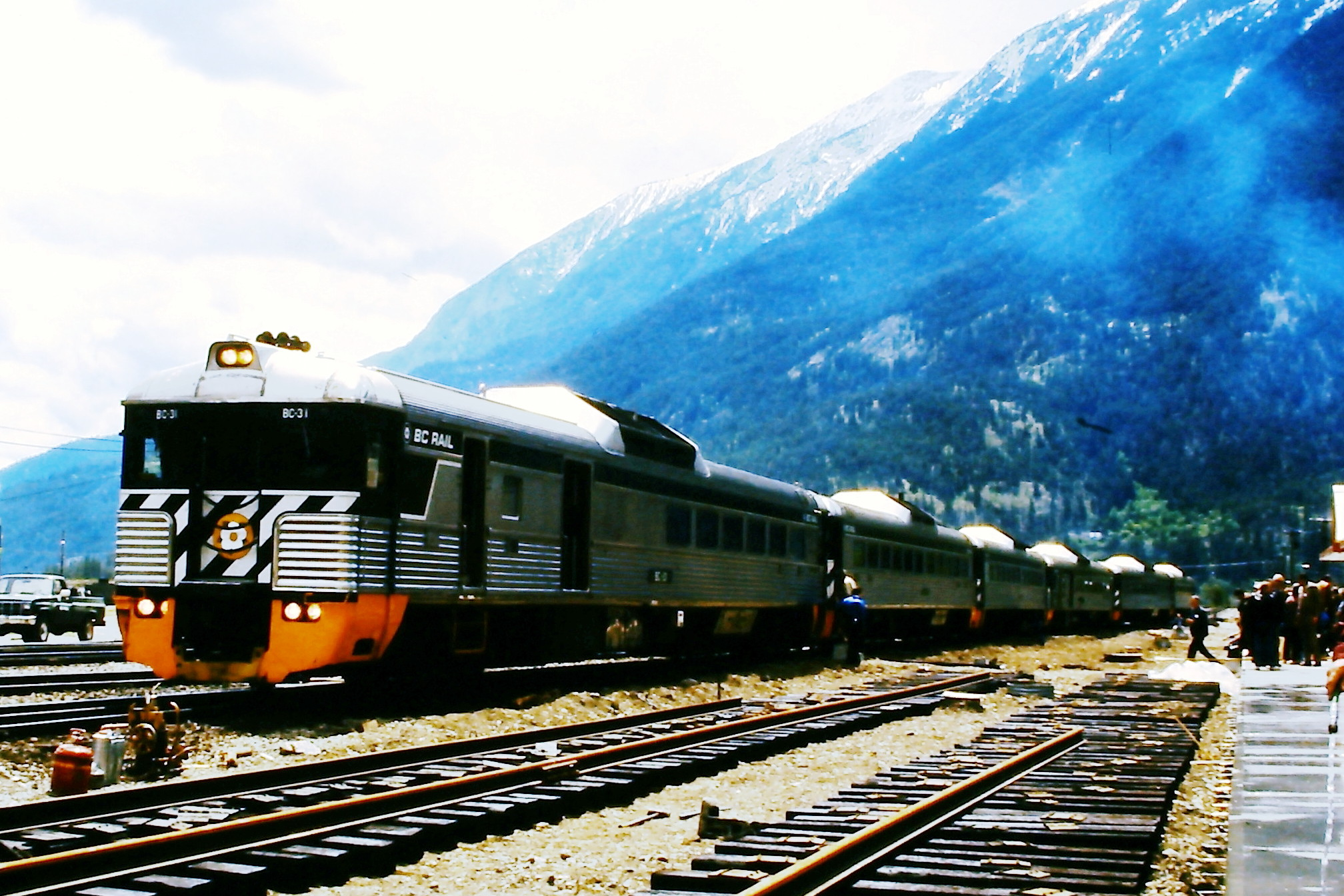
Cariboo Dayliner Lillooet

Since the line opened, the PGE had provided passenger service between Squamish and Quesnel (as well as between North Vancouver and Horseshoe Bay until operations were discontinued there in 1928). When the PGE reached Prince George and North Vancouver, daily service was extended to these cities. Service between Lillooet and Prince George was cut back to three times weekly in the 1960s. In 1978, the McKenzie Royal Commission recommended that the BCR eliminate its passenger services, which were losing over $1 million per year, unless it received government funding for them, but the BCR did not do so. However, facing large losses and an ageing fleet of Budd Rail Diesel Cars, it reduced passenger operations to three trains weekly to Lillooet and once weekly to Prince George on February 16, 1981. This service reduction led to public outrage, and the British Columbia government agreed to provide subsidies for passenger operations. The previous level of service was restored on May 4, 1981.

Passenger service ended on October 31, 2002. BC Rail replaced the service between Lillooet and nearby Seton Portage and D'Arcy with a pair of railbuses, called "track units" by the railway. The railbus on the Kaoham Shuttle makes at least one round trip between Seton Portage and Lillooet daily, and also serves D'Arcy if there is sufficient demand. The Seton Lake Indian Band manages ticket sales, marketing, and customer service for the Kaoham Shuttle service.

== Excursion services ==
The Whistler Northwind

The railway's best-known excursion service was the Royal Hudson train hauled by ex-Canadian Pacific No. 2860, which quickly rose to fame and became the only regularly scheduled steam excursion on mainline trackage in North America. The train began operations on 20 June 1974, running between North Vancouver and Squamish. By the end of its first season, 47,295 passengers had been carried. The Royal Hudson became one of British Columbia's primary tourist attractions. It was cancelled at the end of the 2001 tourist season after two seasons of replacement locomotives used due to issues with No. 2860.

Two other excursion services were introduced by BC Rail in 1997 and 2001. In 1997, BC Rail introduced the Pacific Starlight dinner train, which ran in evenings between May and October between North Vancouver and Porteau Cove. In 2001, BC Rail introduced the Whistler Northwind, a luxury excursion train that ran between May and October, northbound from North Vancouver to Prince George or southbound from Prince George to Whistler. The train used several dome cars built by Colorado Railcar. Both services were discontinued at the end of the 2002 season along with BC Rail's passenger service.

Historically, and discontinued in the 1960s, the railway operated open-top observation cars all the way from North Vancouver to Lillooet and sometimes beyond.

A series of lodges of varying quality grew up along the railway, drawing on weekend tourist excursions from Vancouver via the MV Britannia steamer service to Squamish. The most famous of these was Rainbow Lodge at Whistler, then called Alta Lake, but others were at Birken Lake, Whispering Falls, D'Arcy, Ponderosa, McGillivray Falls, Seton Portage, the Bridge River townsite (where there was a first-class hotel serving mining and hydro executives and their guests), Shalalth, Retaskit and at Craig Lodge near Lillooet. The last-named was a swank tennis resort, its attraction being the arid, sunny climate and the waters of Seton Lake.

While BC Rail no longer operates excursion services, it did lease out its line to Rocky Mountaineer Vacations to use, operating two services over the former BC Rail route. The Whistler Sea to Sky Climb operated (until spring 2016) between Vancouver and Whistler, which featured an observation car similar to the historical open-top car. The Rainforest to Gold Rush train operates north from Vancouver via Whistler and Quesnel to Jasper. Rocky Mountaineer services are exclusively tourist-oriented and do not make local stops nor accept local-area travellers. The fares are significantly higher than former BCR passenger service rates. The West Coast Railway Association returned the Royal Hudson No. 2860 to service during 2006.

== Locomotives ==
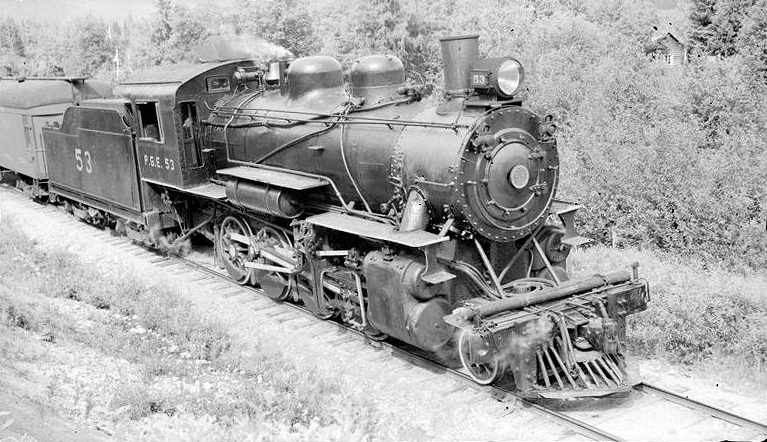
No. 53 hauling a passenger train near Alta Lake in the 1920s

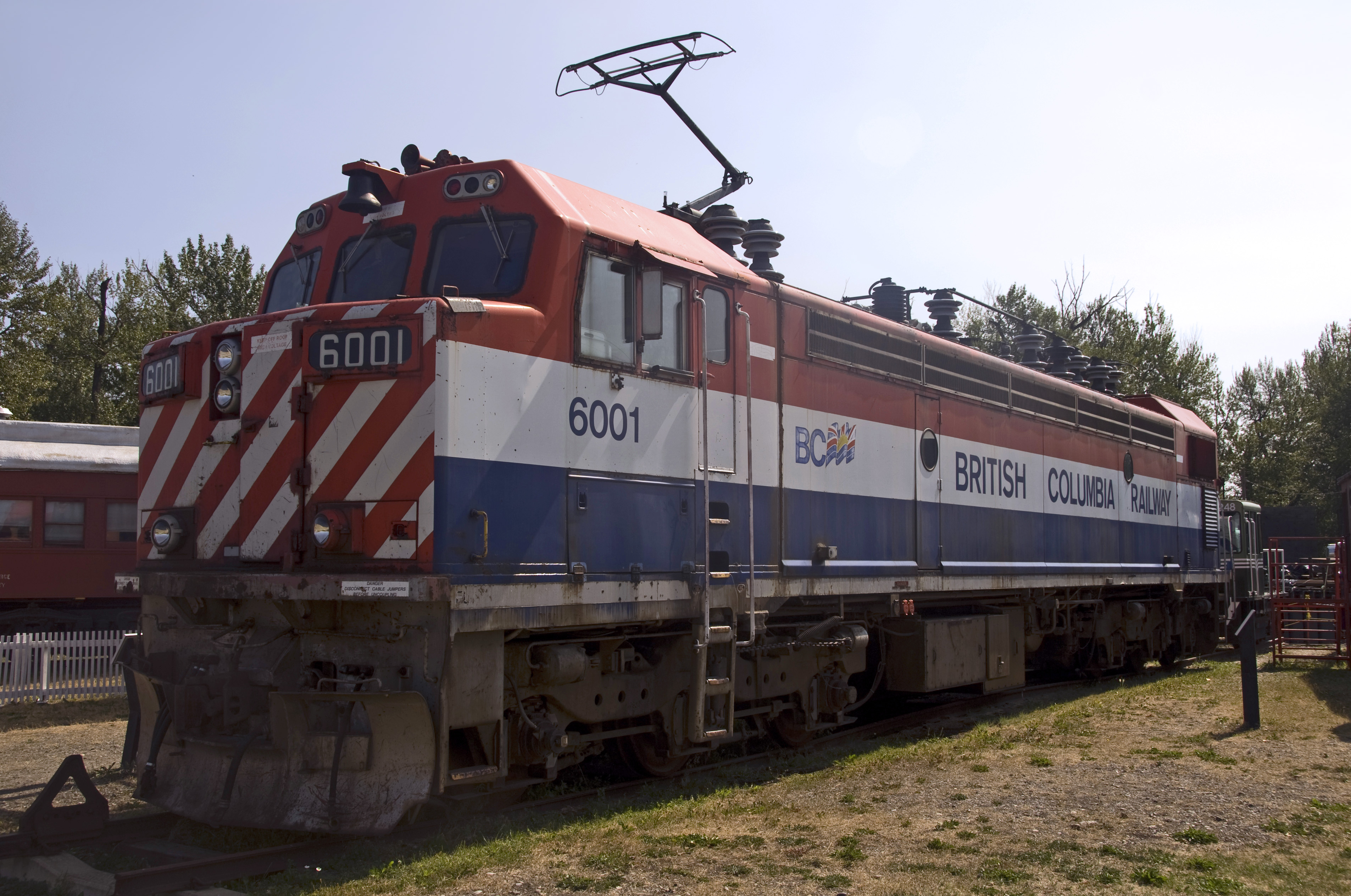
A former BC Rail electric locomotive now on display at the Prince George Railway and Forestry Museum in Prince George

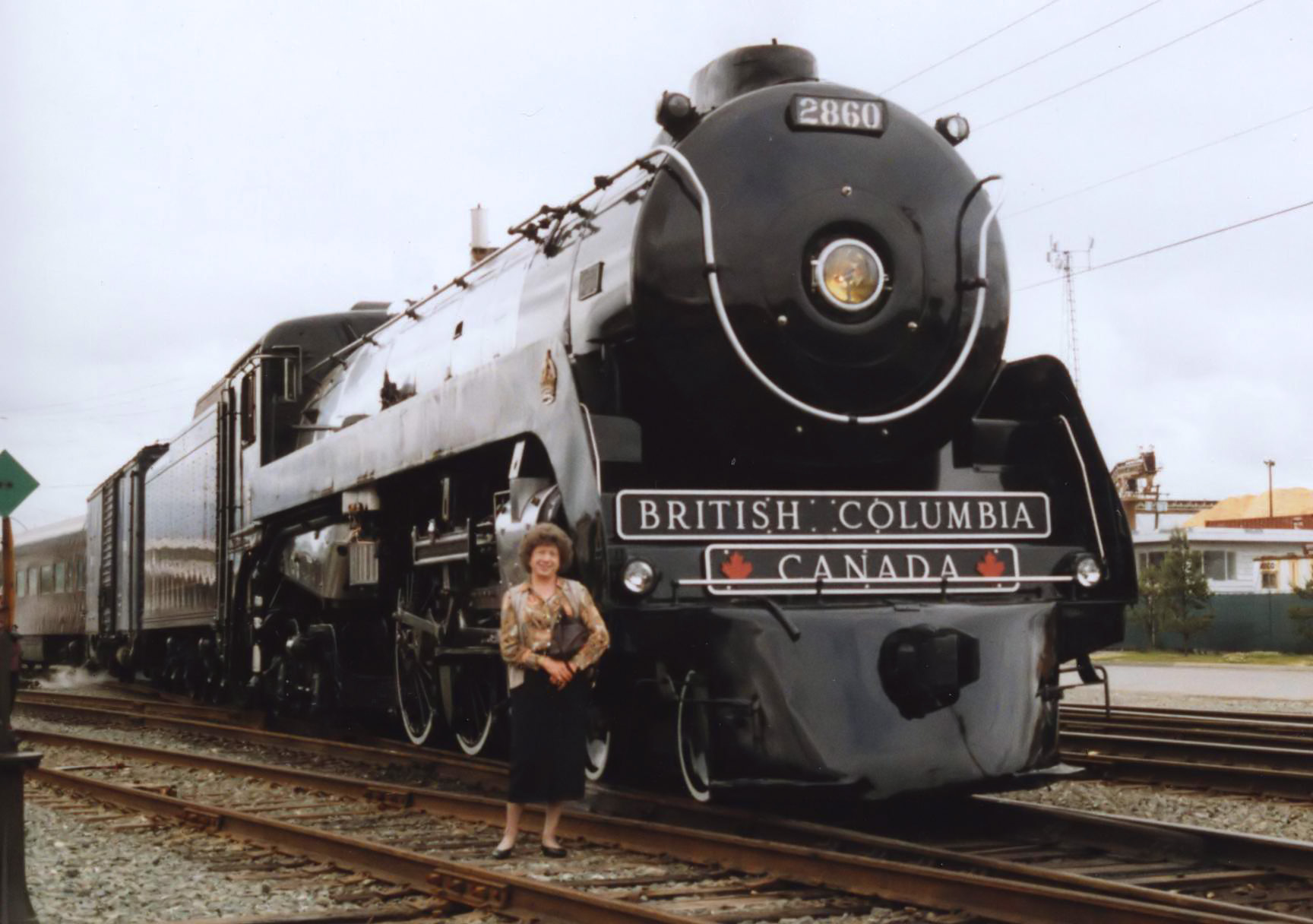
Royal Hudson locomotive No. 2860 at North Vancouver station before departure to Squamish in June 1996

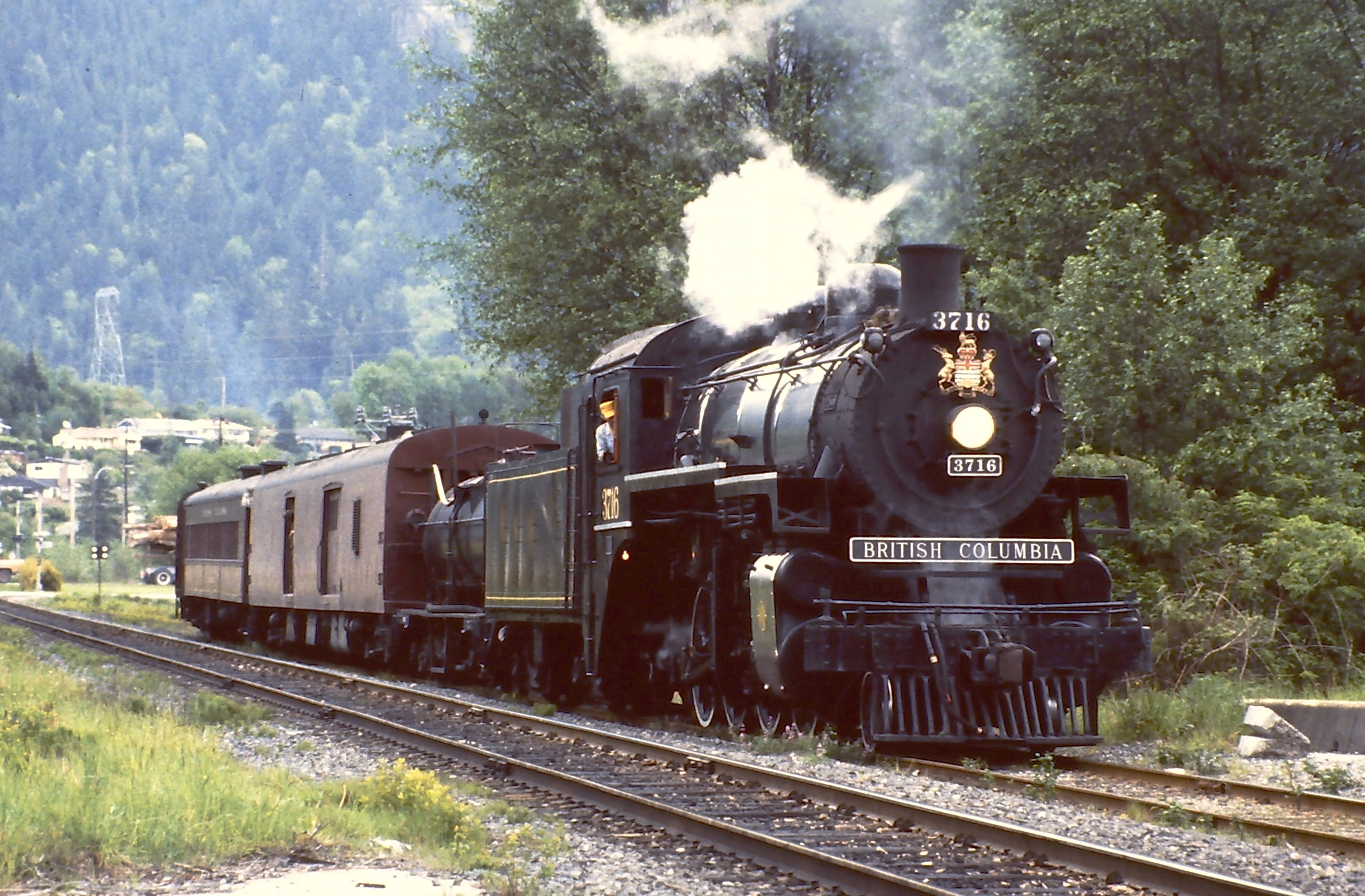
Canadian Pacific No. 3716 hauling the Royal Hudson to Squamish on 22 May 1986, during Expo 86 when No. 2860 was a part of the ceremonies.

Until the late 1940s, most motive power on the PGE was provided by steam locomotives. The majority of the railway's locomotives were of the 2-6-2, 2-8-0 and 2-8-2 (Whyte notation) wheel configurations. In addition, the railway also used a handful of gasoline cars, notably on a flatcar automobile ferry between Shalalth and Lillooet known simply as the Gas Car, once a vital lifeline for the communities of the upper Bridge River basin before the completion of a road from there to Lillooet.

The railway received its first diesel locomotive in June 1948, a General Electric 65-ton locomotive. Over the next two years the railway acquired six GE 70-ton locomotives. In the 1950s, the railway bought RS-3, RS-10, and RS-18 locomotives from the Montreal Locomotive Works (MLW). The railway had fully dieselized by 1956, and by the end of the decade had nearly 40 diesel locomotives. The railway purchased new locomotives exclusively from MLW until 1980. During the 1970s, the railway also purchased several used locomotives, mostly American Locomotive Company (Alco) models from American railways. In the 1980s, the railway acquired new SD40-2 locomotives made by General Motors Diesel, and used SD40–2s made by General Motors Electro-Motive Division (EMD). In the 1990s and early 2000s, a number of locomotives were purchased from General Electric. Purchased new from GE were 26 (4601–4626) C40-8Ms, 4 C44-9WLs and 10 C44-9Ws. Older, secondhand GE locomotives in the form of B36-7s, C36-7MEs, and B39-8Es were also purchased.

In 1970, the railway started using remote controlled mid-train locomotives, allowing longer and heavier trains to be operated through the steep grades of the Coast Mountains. It initially used separate remote control cars to control the mid-train locomotives, but in 1975 it received eight M-420B locomotives from MLW. These locomotives were specially designed for mid-train operation. They contained remote control stations, and were cableless.

The railway also leased seven GF6C electric locomotives made by GMD for use on the electrified Tumbler Ridge Subdivision from 1983 until electrification was removed in 2000. In 2004, the Paul D. Roy family purchased engine 6001, and they donated it to the Central BC Railway and Forestry Museum in Prince George; the remaining six were scrapped.

For passenger service, the PGE purchased seven Budd Rail Diesel Cars in 1956. Starting in the 1970s, the BCR started to purchase some used RDCs. The RDCs were retired in 2002, when BC Rail ended its passenger services.

The BCR also used some historic locomotives for its Royal Hudson excursion service. The primary steam locomotive for the Royal Hudson excursion train was Canadian Pacific Railway No. 2860, a class H1 4-6-4 Royal Hudson. Made by MLW for the Canadian Pacific Railway in June 1940, it was the first locomotive built as a Royal Hudson. A sister locomotive, No. 2850, pulled King George VI's and Queen Elizabeth's royal train in 1939. After the tour, the King gave the CPR permission to use the term Royal Hudson for the class of locomotives. Between 1940 and 1956 it hauled transcontinental passenger trains between Revelstoke and Vancouver. Damaged in a derailment in 1956, it was refurbished and transferred to Winnipeg in 1957 for service on the prairies. It was withdrawn from service in May 1959, replaced by diesel locomotives. It was sold to the Vancouver Railway Museum Association in 1964 and was stored in Vancouver until 1973, when the British Columbia government acquired the locomotive from Joe W. Hussey, who had purchased it three years earlier. It was restored by Robert Swanson and then leased to the British Columbia Railway, who used it in excursion service between 1974 and 1999. It was out of service during the 2000 and 2001 tourist seasons as it needed extensive repairs. The backup for No. 2860 was Canadian Pacific Railway No. 3716, a 2-8-0 built by MLW in 1912. During the 2001 season, when both steam locomotives were out of service, BC Rail leased No. 4069, a restored Canadian Pacific Railway FP7A diesel locomotive.

In November 2020, as part of celebrations for the 25th anniversary of CN's privatization, the company unveiled a series of locomotives repainted in the schemes of its predecessor and subsidiary railroads. GE ET44AC No. 3115 was repainted in the blue, white and red livery of BC Rail, along with the logos of that company.
