= GMD GF6C =

Class of 7 Canadian electric locomotives

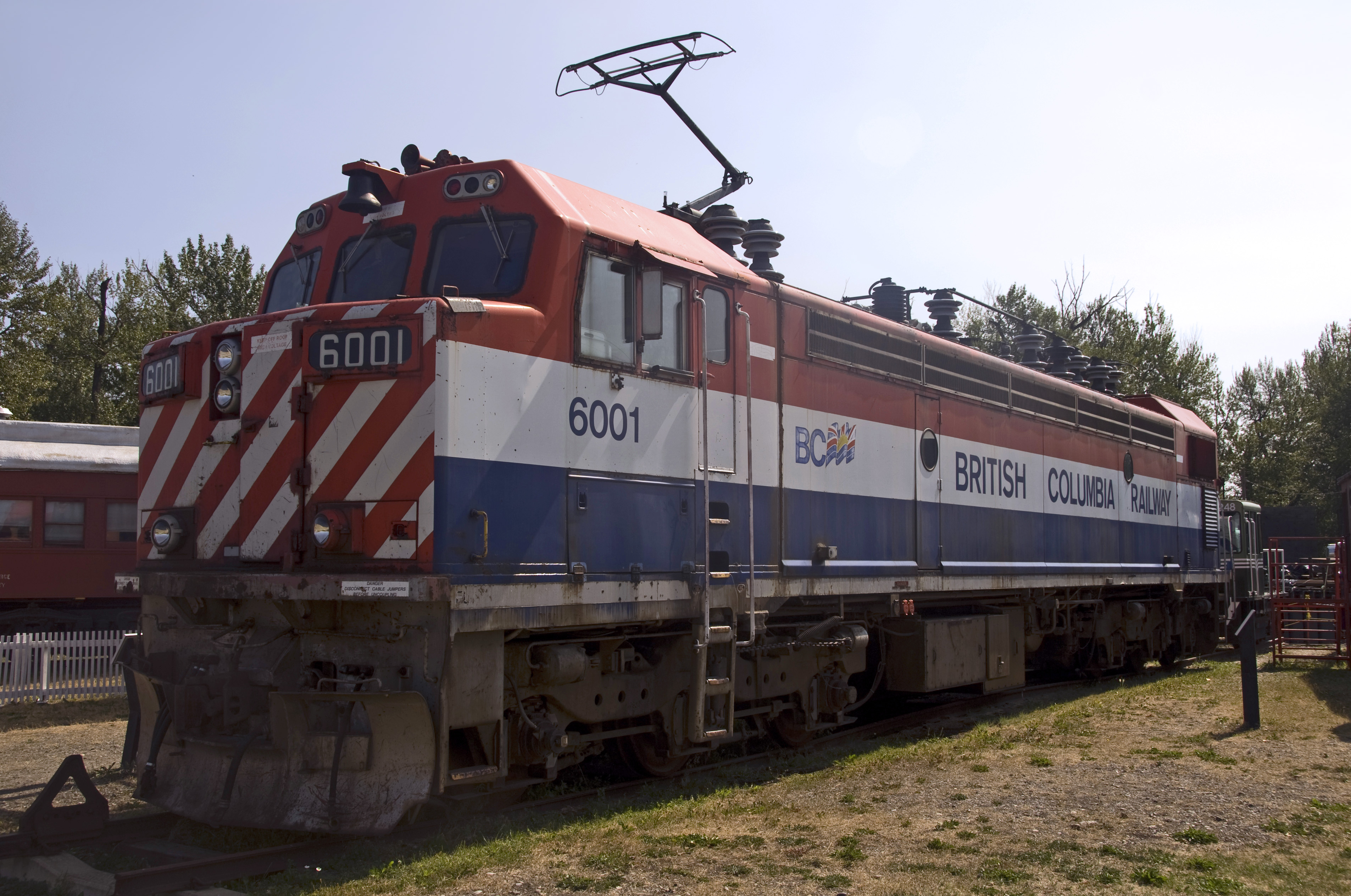
- GMD GF6C locomotive #6001 at the Railway & Forestry Museum in Prince George, BC.
Type and origin
- Power type: Electric
- Builder: General Motors Diesel
- Serial number: A4340–A4346
- Model: GF6C
- Build date: 1983–1984
- Total produced: 7
Specifications
- Configuration
  - AAR: C-C
  - UIC: Co′Co′
- Gauge: 4 ft 8 1/2 in (1,435 mm)
- Trucks: EMD HTC
- Wheel diameter: 42 in (1,067 mm)
- Length: 68 ft 10 in (20.98 m)
- Loco weight: 396,000 lb (180,000 kilograms)
- Electric system/s: 50 kV AC Catenary
- Current pickup: Pantograph
- Traction motors: 6 × EMD E88X
Performance figures
- Power output: 6,000 hp (4.47 MW)
Career
- Operators: BC Rail (BCOL)
- Numbers: BCOL 6001–6007
- Locale: British Columbia, Canada
- Last run: October 1, 2000
- Disposition: 6 scrapped, 1 preserved

The GF6C was an electric locomotive for freight duties built by General Motors Diesel in collaboration with ASEA of Sweden.

Seven of these locomotives were built in 1983 and 1984, for use on the BC Rail's electrified Tumbler Ridge subdivision.

Similar to EMD's GM6C testbed locomotive, the GF6C used a frame and running gear that was identical to that of EMD's popular SD40-2 diesel-electric locomotive, but had a wide cab and carbody similar to that of GMD's SD40-2F.

BC Rail chose electrification for the Tumbler Subdivision because the line had long, non-ventilated tunnels, as well as steep grades and sharp curves. The line served the Quintette and Bull-Moose coal mines, and hauled coal from the mines to an interchange with CN, where diesel power took over to haul the coal to Prince Rupert where it was loaded onto deep-sea coal carrier ships.

A combination of the declining coal market, and lack of coal being produced from the Quintette mine led to the electric system being shut down due to low traffic, and high maintenance costs. The system transferred over to diesel hauled trains after the last electrically hauled train left the Teck loadout (Bull-moose mine) on October 1, 2000. Towards the later years of operation, the GF6C units were de-rated due to the high number of traction motor failures. It is not known what their horsepower rating was after this modification, however loaded trains leaving the east side of the subdivision typically saw the use of 3 leading units, and 3 helper units per train. Previously, each loaded train typically had 2 leading units, and 2 helper units. The helper units were cut from the train upon reaching the summit.

In 2004, the Roy family purchased locomotive 6001 and donated it to the Prince George Railway and Forestry Museum in Prince George; the remaining six locomotives were scrapped. 6001 is currently preserved and in remarkable condition, and, according to the museum's curator and park manager, is still operable if provided with 50 kV of electricity.

== See also ==
- List of GMD Locomotives
