= Carlton Trail Railway =

Canadian shortline railway

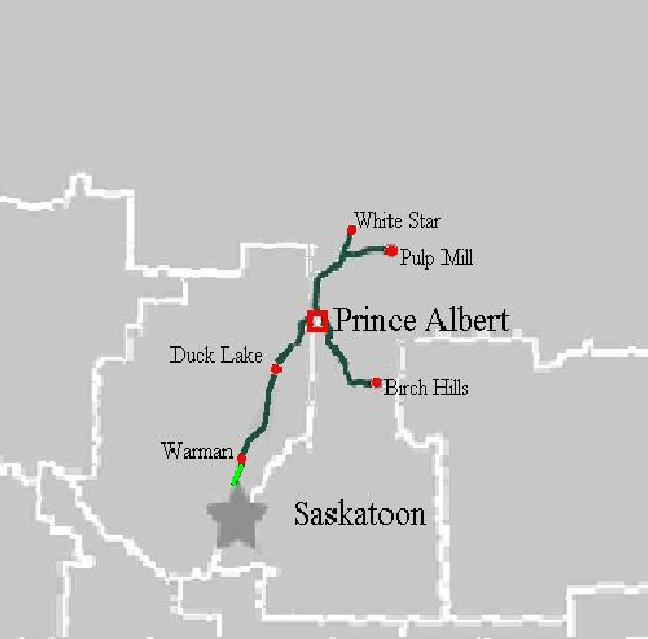
- CTRW in dark green, trackage rights with CN in light green

Overview
- Headquarters: Prince Albert, Saskatchewan
- Reporting mark: CTRW
- Locale: Northern Saskatchewan
- Dates of operation: 1997–
- Predecessor: Canadian National Railway

Technical
- Track gauge: 4 ft 8 1/2 in (1,435 mm) standard gauge

Other
- Website: omnitrax.com/carlton-trail-2/

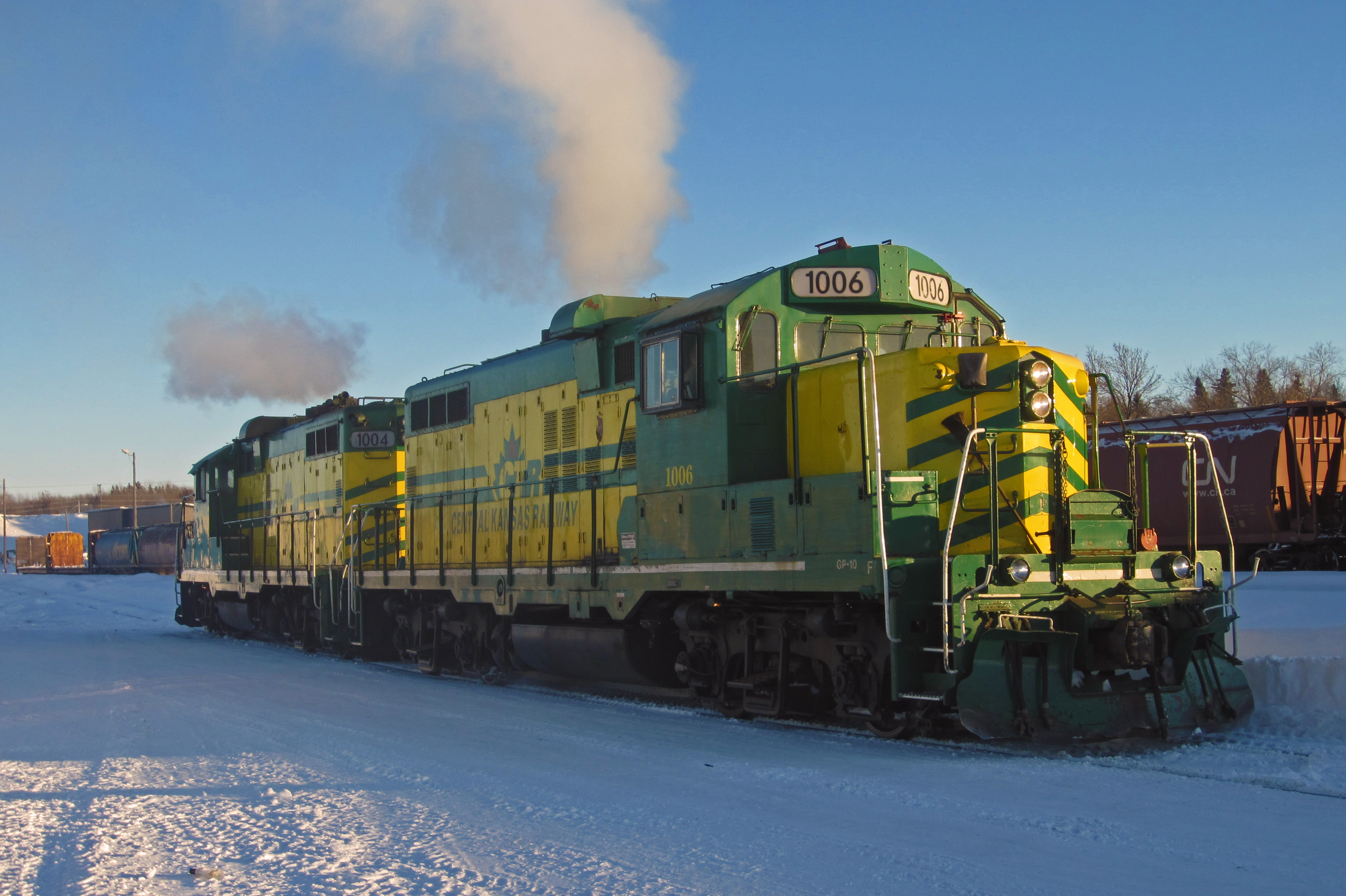
Carlton Trail locomotives in Prince Albert, 2013

The Carlton Trail Railway (reporting mark CTRW) is a shortline railway with its headquarters in Prince Albert, Saskatchewan. It is operated by OmniTRAX, an American transportation company in Denver, Colorado. Carlton Trail has been operating on ex-Canadian National track since December 8, 1997; however, after the acquisition of the branch line CTRW also purchased from CN the Birch Hills-Fenton-Prince Albert branch line in 2001. Since the closure of the pulp mill in 2006, Carlton Trail has typically adhered to a schedule of twice weekly rail service, hauling approximately 2000 carloads per year.

== Shortline railways ==
Over the past several decades many branch lines on the prairies have been discontinued as they have not proved cost effective for the two Federally regulated rail lines, Canadian National Railway & Canadian Pacific Railway. Often these lines carry grain or ship from mills in the north, shortlines help to fill the gap and continue to provide the service of rail. In recent years Saskatchewan has seen a large influx of shortline railways as the two Class 1s find it difficult to draw a profit from remote locations. Many shortline railways cannot afford the maintenance work the lines desperately need and often need financial assistance from the Provincial Government.

== History ==
The Carlton Trail was originally an overland transportation route connecting Winnipeg and Fort Edmonton during the early 19th century and the latter days of the fur trade in the Northwest Territories. The Carlton Trail cut its way into what is now Saskatchewan southeast of Melville, headed in a northwesterly route towards Batoche; where the trail crossed the South Saskatchewan River and then towards Fort Carlton. The trail continued on past Fort Carlton along the northern banks of the North Saskatchewan River for another 980 km to Fort Pitt and finally terminating at Fort Edmonton. OmniTRAX had decided during the inception of the new shortline, that it should be named after this famous trading route; hence the name of the railway being Carlton Trail Railway.

Much of the southern portion of Carlton Trail Railway's Speers Subdivision straddles the proximity of the original Carlton Trail; which would have followed the North Saskatchewan River towards the Battlefords. Carlton Trail Railway had originally taken control of the Warman subdivision and the Speers subdivision. At Warman Carlton Trail transfers onto CN and has limited trackage rights into CN's Saskatoon Chappell Yard. The Speers subdivision extends from the Speers Jct north on both former Canadian National and Canadian Pacific rail line until it reaches Meadow Lake.

The Speers subdivision proved problematic due to past neglect, and on October 7, 2008 Carlton Trail gave notice that it was discontinuing rail services to Meadow Lake on April 1, 2009. Carlton Trail continues to own the Meadow Lake Branch, but has made no indication that operations will start up anytime soon. Many rural communities however have taken interest in the line and recent discussions indicate it could be purchased by the local Rural Municipalities, under the name North Central Rail. As of November, 2010 North Central Rail Ltd and OmniTRAX have yet to reach a tentative agreement in the transfer of ownership of the Speers Subdivision. According to Ray Wilfing, chair of NCR Ltd., OmniTRAX has delayed the sale of the line by not responding to North Central's formal offer in August 2009. North Central Rail lodged a negotiating in bad faith complaint with the Highway Traffic Board in December 2009 in order to pressure OmniTRAX to return to the table to discuss the offer. OmniTRAX was given a deadline of February 15, 2010 to come up with a reasonable response to the offer for the rail line. On 15 February, OmniTRAX responded with a counteroffer that was well beyond what North Central Rail could afford. On July 16, 2010 OmniTRAX put the Speers Subdivision up for sale for 11.2 million dollars, a price the Rural Municipality of Meadow Lake along with 17 other municipalities would like a justification for. Updated 2013 Google Street View imagery of the former railway crossing on the Yellowhead Highway at Denholm, Saskatchewan (the southern terminus of the branch and only connection of the branch to the rest of the North American rail network) and various other places along the line shows that the tracks along the length of the line have been torn up and the line abandoned.

On January 17, 2001 CTR purchased the line between Prince Albert and Birch Hills (40.87 km), though this line is rarely if ever used as it serves no economical purpose. CTR also briefly controlled the Arborfield branch line when CN placed it up for sale. Due to the long distance between the Aborfield subdivision and head offices in Prince Albert, CTR placed the line up for sale and later sold it to Arborfield Thunder Rail Ltd.

== Colours and Symbol ==
Carlton Trail's symbol is the Prairie Lily that grows abundantly in the fields and ditches in and around Prince Albert. The primary colours for the railway are green and yellow, the two primary colours synonymous with Saskatchewan and are present on both the Saskatchewan Provincial flag and the Prince Albert municipal flag. All engines in CTRW livery bear the lily, but are also similar to sister railways of Hudson Bay Railway and the now defunct Okanagan Valley Railway, in that the striping on the engines is the same except for colour. One possible reason for this is the constant exchange of motive power between OmniTRAX rail lines and the cost behind painting each engine a specific livery. Ironically, the only M420 ever painted in CTRW livery suffered a diesel fuel fire when the fuel return line leaked into the engine compartment, even after it was not recommended to be run. The engine was severely damaged outside of North Battleford and was shipped to Prince Albert to be scrapped. Due to the increased cost of painting each new engine, CTRW has now resorted to patching over the reporting mark of the former railway.

== Engines ==
Unit	Model	Built	Acquired	Retired	Status	Notes	Example Image
208-2	RS-18	1968	1999	2002	Sold to (D) Ed Bowers	Markings of INCO	
602	C424	1965	2000	2000	Sold to (D) Ed Bowers	Markings of Belt Railway of Chicago	
643	M-420	1973	1998	1999	Scrapped in 2002	Former BC Rail	
681	M-420B	1975	1998	2003	Sold to (D)Ed Bowers	Former BC Rail; only B-unit to be used	
1004	GP10	1955	1998	2015	Alternator Fire - Storage not operational		
1006	GP10	1955	1999–2001 (2009–Present)	N/A	IN SERVICE - Returned from now defunct Okanagan Valley Railway (OKAN)		
1012	GP10	1954	1998	1998	Acquired for parts - Markings of MidSouth Rail Corporation		
1020	GP10	1955	1997	2004	Scrapped 2003 - Frame scrapped and removed October 2012		
1025	GP10	1957	1998	1999	Sent to CKRY, then to Okanagan Valley Railway (OKAN)- Scrapped in 2005	48" Fans	
1038	GP10	1956	1998	1998	Repainted then transferred to Okanagan Valley Railway (OKAN) 1998		
1040	GP10	1955	1999 (2001–2007)	2007	Scrapped 2007 - Frame scrapped and removed October 2012	Spent some time on Central Kansas Railway (CKRY), had markings of CKRY at time of scrapping.	
1042	GP10	1955	1998	1999	Repainted and transferred to Chicago Rail Link		
1049	GP10	1956	1998	1998	Scrapped, 2005	Scrapped by OKAN	
1064	GP10	1955	1997-1998 (2001–Present)	2015	Damage to main generator - Not operational	Markings of OKAN/CKRY	
2250	GP38-3	1964	N/A		Transferred to Kettle Falls International Railway	Nee SSW GP35, OmniTRAX (OMLX) rebuild	
2253	GP38-3	1965	2003	2004	Transferred to Kettle Falls International Railway	Nee SP GP35, OMLX rebuild	
2508	GP30	1962	2001–present	N/A	Stored, out of Service	Working order. Not allowed to be in service.	
2674	GP38-2		N/A	2009	GATX lease unit^{†}	On HBRY	
2683	GP38-2		N/A	2009	GATX lease unit^{†}	Utilized on Speers Subdivision	
2686	GP38-2		N/A	2009	GATX lease unit^{†}	Utilized on Speers Subdivision	
2687	GP38-2		N/A	2009	GATX lease unit, currently on HBRY	Utilized on Speers Subdivision	
3005	GP40-2W	1976	2005	2008		née CN 9634	
3372	GP9E	1954	2001	2012	Scrapped (October 2012) Sold for parts, bell and number boards saved	Loose injector line filled crankcase with diesel and crankshaft broke crankshaft in half.	
3532	M-420	1974	1998	N/A	Scrapped 2008 by HBRY		
3538	M-420	1974	2001	N/A	Scrapped 2008 by HBRY		
3540	M-420	1974	1998	2001	Severe fire damage near North Battleford	Only M420 to be painted in CTRW livery. Number boards and marker lights saved, owned by local collector.	
3541	M-420	1974	1998	2001	Scrapped in 2002		
3547	M-420	1974	1999	N/A	Scrapped by HBRY 2008		
3549	M-420	1974	1998	2003	Scrapped by HBRY 2008		
3764	GP9E	1957	N/A		Scrapped by HBRY, was to be delivered to OKAN in 2001.	Scrapped 2015 in The Pas, Manitoba	
5517	GP40	1965	2015	N/A	NREX Leaser - Sent from HBRY		
6568	GP35M	1964		2000	Transferred to HBRY	Former Southern Pacific now owned by OmniTRAX; converted into GP38-3 in The Pas, Manitoba	
6657^{‡}	GP35M	1965		2000	Transferred to HBRY	Former Southern Pacific now owned by OmniTRAX; converted into GP38-3 in The Pas, Manitoba	
9570	GP40-2LW	1975	2004	N/A	Operating on HBRY 2010	Nee CN 9570	

^{†}Lease cancelled as of April 1, 2009 with the discontinuance of the Meadow Lake Branch, units sent to Hudson Bay Railway (HBRY) ^{‡}6657 was converted into 2253, GP38-3 and then returned to Carlton Trail Railway to be utilized on Speers Subdivision

== Customers ==
Since the closure of Weyerhaeuser Pulp & Paper Mill in Prince Albert Carlton Trail's loads have considerably gotten smaller as they have less to haul. Their primary customer in Prince Albert is the Viterra Inland Terminal, in White Star, but also serve Carrier Lumber, transport steel for a local business and serve Belle Pulses within the community of Duck Lake. Agriculture products include wheat, barley, canola, peas, flax and oats. In recent years Carlton Trail has begun to store rolling stock belonging to Class I railways. Much of the rolling stock stored along the shortline are Liquefied Petroleum Gas from the gas fields of Alberta. Carlton Trail has also serves many northern communities by hauling calcium chloride into Prince Albert where Tiger Calcium Services constructed a distribution centre located on the south side of the rail yards. Calcium chloride is used to reduce the amount of dust created on grid roads.

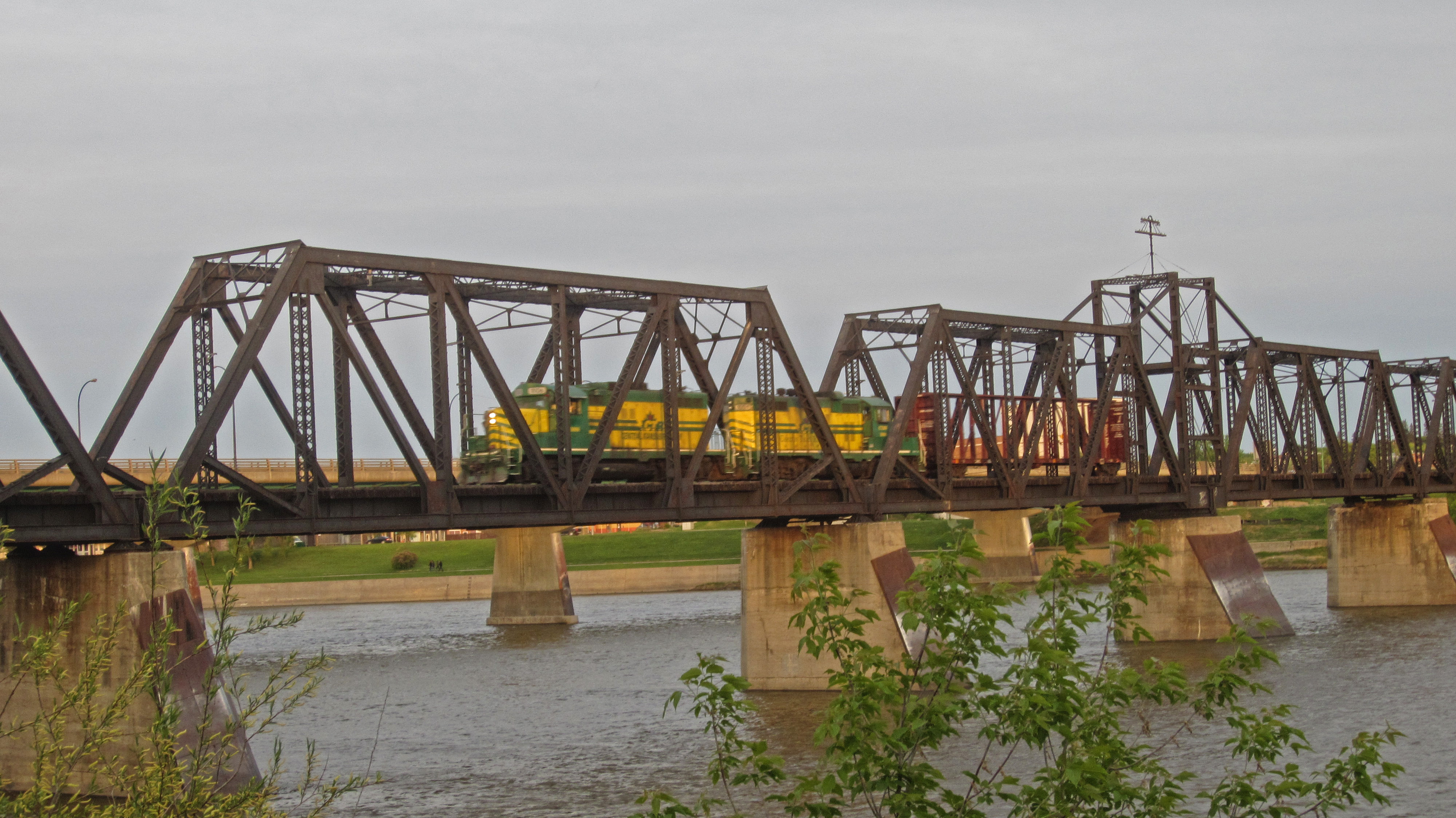
Carlton Trail Railway hauling an empty centerbeam car to Carrier Lumber, 2013

== Post CN Era ==
Prince Albert's CN rail yard has gone through severe attrition since the 1990s; having lost the scale house, sanding tower, bulk fuel tanks, CN station (now a strip mall) and many other rail-related buildings. Since 1991 branchlines in the Prince Albert area began to disappear, including the abandonment of the Canadian Pacific Railway yard. Carlton Trail however began reusing the roundhouse and turntable shortly after purchasing the Canadian National line. The roundhouse provides cover for their equipment and engines (CN would leave their engines outside next to the roundhouse). Carlton Trail continues to repair cars that have been damaged during derailments along their line. In recent years, larger shortline railways have removed oddball motive power, such as ALCO and MLW units from their roster; as such Carlton Trail now strictly operates used EMD units that they have purchased. Currently the only operational engines are three GP10s that run between Saskatoon & Prince Albert.

== See also ==
- Okanagan Valley Railway
- Hudson Bay Railway
- Canadian National Railway
- Canadian Pacific Railway
- OmniTRAX
- Thunder Rail Ltd.
