= EMD GP9 =

Model of locomotive built by EMD

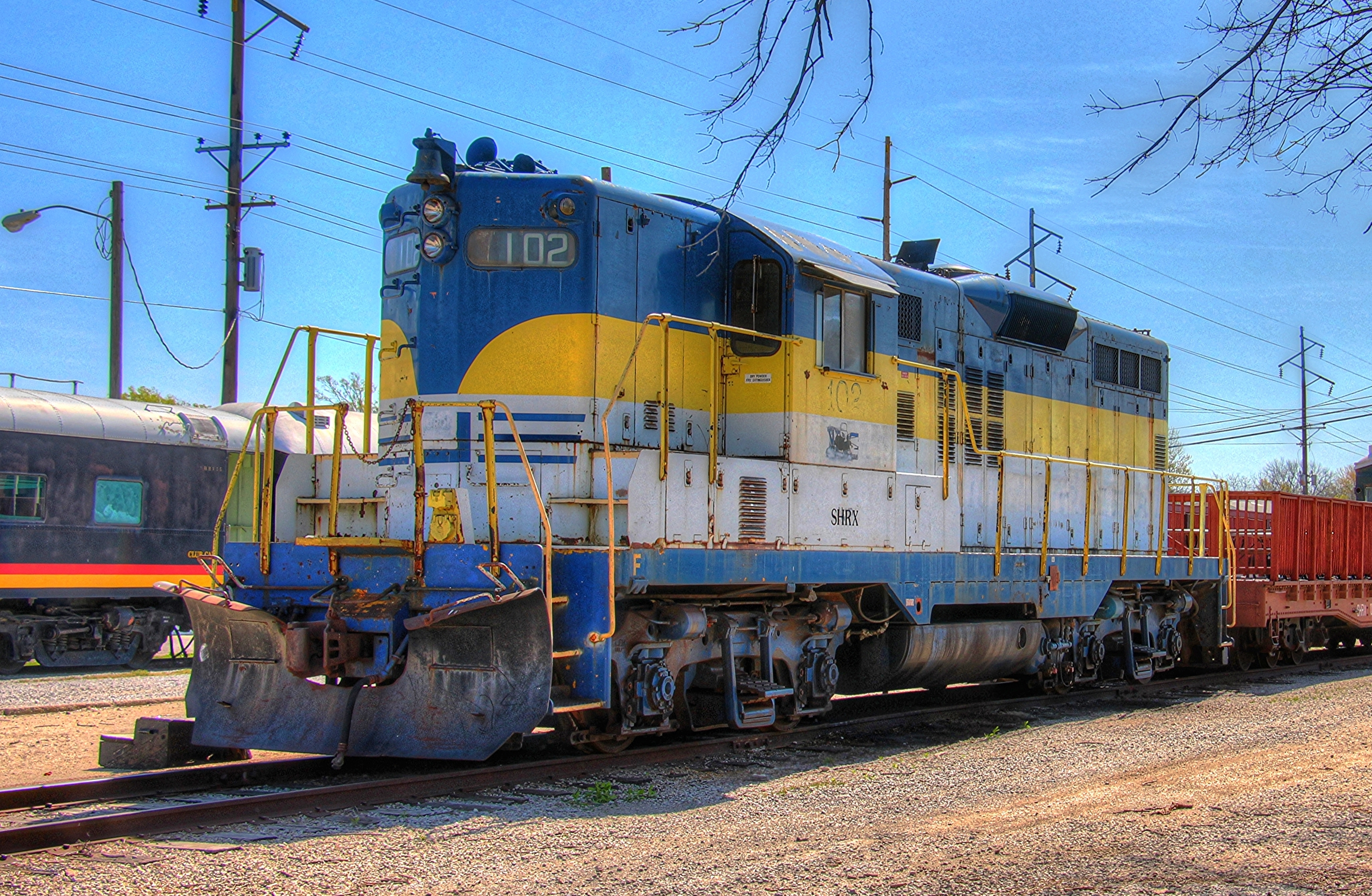
- A Belton, Grandview and Kansas City Railroad EMD GP9 in Belton, Missouri, in 2016
Type and origin
- Power type: Diesel-electric
- Builder: General Motors Electro-Motive Division (EMD); General Motors Diesel (GMD)
- Model: GP9
- Build date: 1954 – 1963
- Total produced: 4,092 (and 165 B units)
Specifications
- Configuration
  - AAR: B-B
  - UIC: Bo'Bo'
- Gauge: 4 ft 8 1/2 in (1,435 mm) standard gauge 5 ft 3 in (1,600 mm) (Brazil)
- Trucks: EMD Blomberg B (Flexicoil on some CN units)
- Wheel diameter: 40 in (1.016 m)
- Minimum curve: 21° (273 ft (83.21 m) radius)
- Wheelbase: 40 ft (12.19 m)
- Length: 56 ft 2 in (17.12 m)
- Width: 10 ft 3 1/2 in (3.14 m)
- Height: 15 ft 1/2 in (4.58 m)
- Loco weight: 259,500 lb (117,700 kg)
- Fuel capacity: 1,100 US gal (4,200 L; 920 imp gal)
- Prime mover: EMD 16-567C
- RPM range: 835 max
- Engine type: V16 Two-stroke diesel
- Aspiration: Roots blower
- Displacement: 9,072 cu in (148.66 L)
- Generator: EMD D-12-B
- Traction motors: (4) EMD D-37-B
- Cylinders: 16
- Cylinder size: 8 1/2 in × 10 in (216 mm × 254 mm)
Performance figures
- Maximum speed: 65 mph (105 km/h)
- Power output: 1,750 hp (1.30 MW)
- Tractive effort: 64,750 lbf (288.0 kN)
Career
- Locale: North America, South America

The EMD GP9 is a four-axle diesel-electric locomotive built by General Motors' Electro-Motive Division between 1954 and 1963. The GP9 succeeded the GP7 as the second model of EMD's General Purpose (GP) line, incorporating a new sixteen-cylinder engine which generated 1,750 horsepower (1.30 MW). This locomotive type was offered both with and without control cabs; locomotives built without control cabs were called GP9B locomotives. The GP9 was succeeded by the similar but slightly more powerful GP18.

== Design and production ==
EMD designed the GP9 as an improved version of the GP7, with an increase in power from 1,500 hp to 1,750 hp, and a change in prime mover to the latest version of the 567 engine, the 567C. Externally, the GP9 strongly resembled its predecessor. Most were built with high short hoods, but the Southern Pacific ordered a number with low short hoods for improved crew visibility.

EMD built GP9s at its LaGrange, Illinois facility until 1959, when American production was ended in favor of the GP18. GMD production in Canada continued until August 1963, when the final GP9 was produced.

== Original owners ==
EMD produced 4,257 GP9 locomotives, including 165 B units. 646 of the locomotives, intended for Canadian railroads, were built by General Motors Diesel, EMD's Canadian subsidiary. Approximately 75 railroads purchased GP9s. Major customers included the Chesapeake and Ohio Railway (363), Illinois Central Railroad (348), Union Pacific Railroad (345, including 125 B units), Canadian National Railway (339), Pennsylvania Railroad (310, including 40 B units), Norfolk and Western Railway (306), Southern Pacific Railroad (253), and Canadian Pacific Railway (200).

== Rebuilds ==
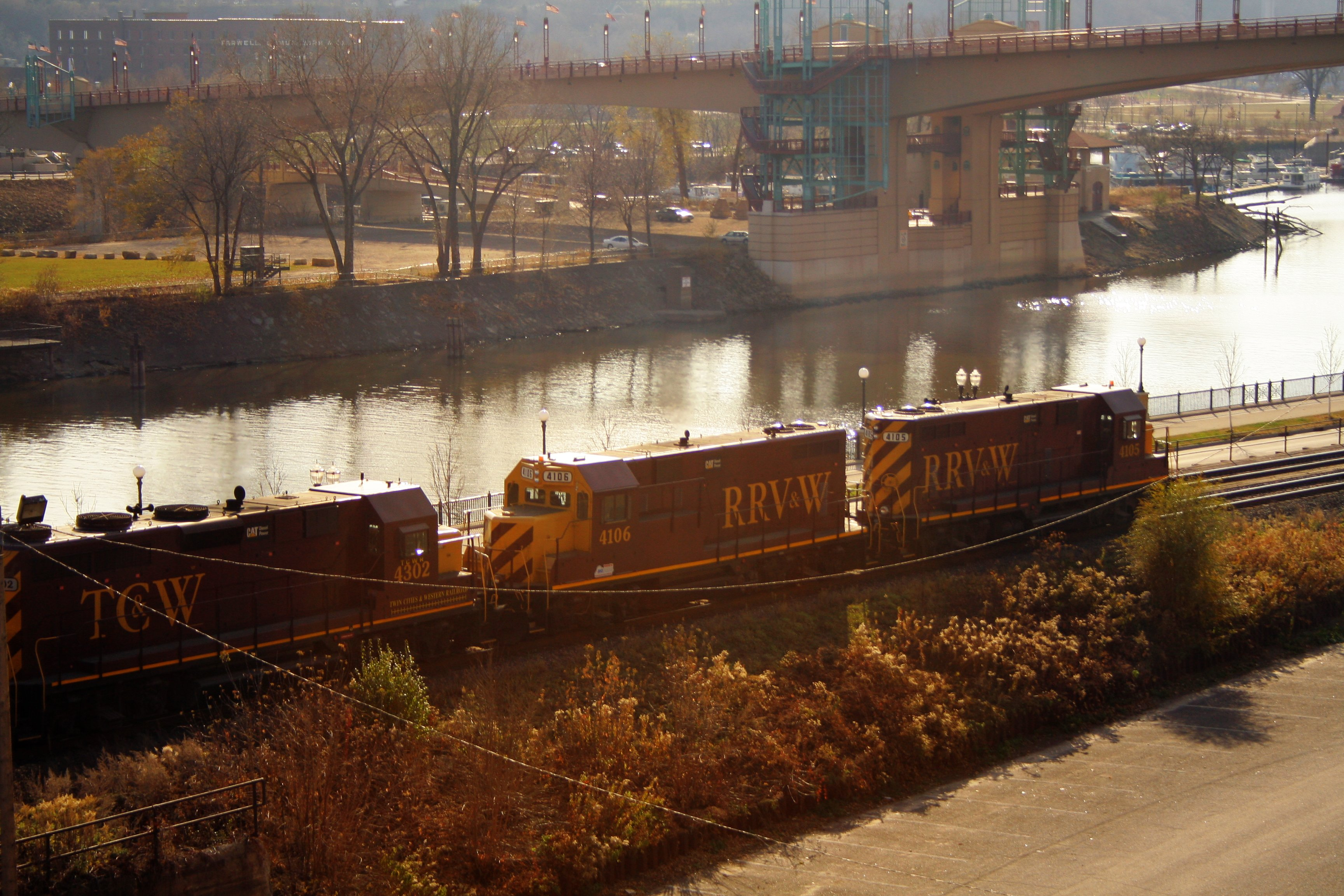
Two GP15Cs with the Red River Valley and Western Railroad.

There were 40 GP9M units built that are included in the 3,441 units built for United States railroads. A GP9M was built with parts from another older EMD locomotive, either an F unit or a damaged GP7. The use of parts from these older locomotives caused the GP9Ms to have a lower power rating than a GP9. This would be either 1,350 horsepower (1.01 MW) if the donor locomotive was an FT/F2 or 1,500 horsepower (1.12 MW) from F3/F7/GP7 locomotives.

Many rebuilt GP9s remain in service today with shortline railroads and industrial operators. Some remain in rebuilt form on some major Class I railroads, as switcher locomotives although most Class 1 railroads stopped using these locomotives by the 1980s. Canadian National still had 29 GP9RM locomotives in operation, as of 2022. Canadian Pacific had many GP9u locomotives in operation; however, they were all retired in 2015.

=== EMD GP15C ===
Several GP9s were rebuilt with a 1,500 horsepower (1.12 MW) CAT 3512 and re-classified as GP15C.

=== EMD GP10 ===
The Illinois Central Railroad rebuilt some of its GP9s with their front (short) hood reduced in height for improved crew visibility. The IC designated these rebuilt locomotives GP10.

Conrail (CR) would also rebuild former Penn Central (PC) GP9s into GP10s

=== EMD GP20C-ECO ===
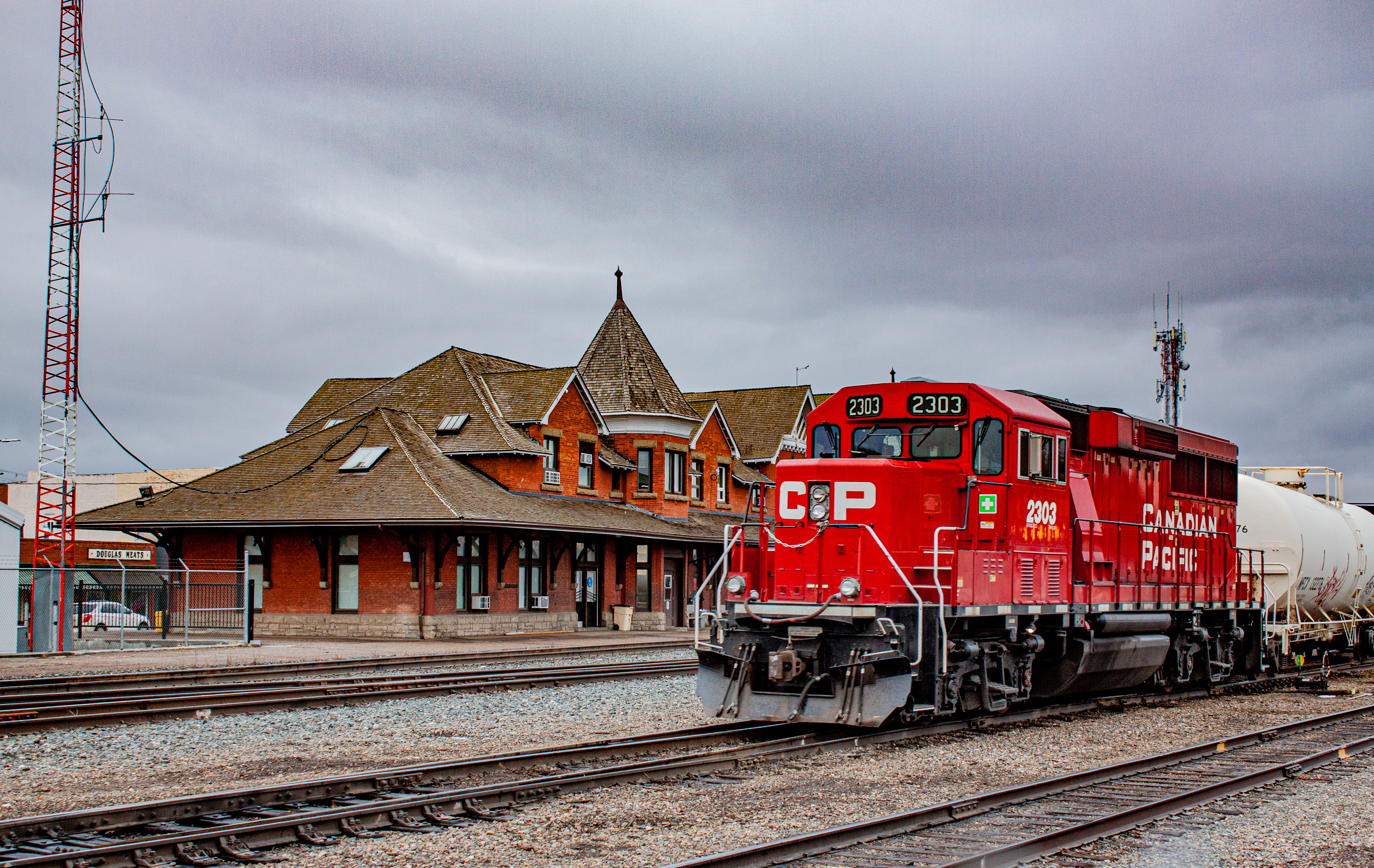
A Canadian Pacific Railway EMD GP20C-ECO, the product of a GP9 rebuild.

EMD has rebuilt and continues to rebuild GP9s into what it calls the GP20C-ECO, which is repowered with an EMD 8-710-G3A engine in place of the original 567 prime mover.

=== SP GP9E and GP9R ===
Between April 1970 and March 1979, the St. Louis Southwestern Railway (also known as the "Cotton Belt Route") and the Southern Pacific Transportation Company had rebuilt the majority of their EMD GP9 locomotives into SP GP9E and GP9R locomotives.

=== CN GP9RM ===
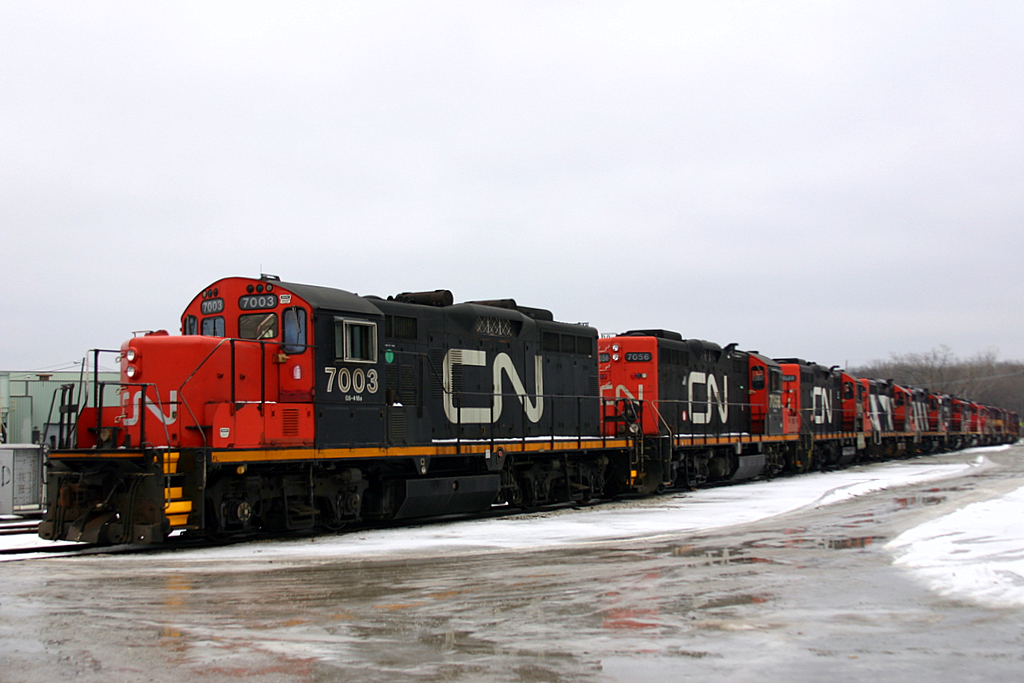
A fleet of CN GP9RMs on January 5, 2008

The Canadian National Railway (CN) rebuilt locomotives into GP9RM, with the "RM" denoting for "Remanufactured", the first batch of 37 GP9s were rebuilt between 1981 and 1984, and were numbered as 4000 through 4036, the second batch of 44 GP9s were rebuilt in two periods, with the first 17 being rebuilt in 1984, and the remaining 27 being rebuilt between 1989 and 1991, all of which were numbered 4100 through 4143, the third batch of 84 GP9s being rebuilt in two periods, with the first 14 being rebuilt in 1985, and the remaining 70 GP9s being rebuilt between 1991 and 1993, all of which were numbered 7000 through 7083, and there was the fourth batch of 81 GP9s divided into three periods, with the first 49 being rebuilt between 1985 and 1988, the second 22 being rebuilt in 1990, and the remaining 10 being rebuilt between 1993 and 1994, all of which were numbered 7200 through 7280.

== Preservation ==
At least 23 GP9 locomotives have been preserved at various railroad museums, as "park engines", and as excursion engines according to The Diesel Shop:

- Baltimore & Ohio 6607, originally numbered 3414, is at the National Museum of Railroad History & Innovation, Baltimore, Maryland, in operating condition.
- Southern Pacific 3194, a GP9R rebuild built as Texas and New Orleans 281, is at the Golden Gate Railroad Museum in Schellville, California. It is in operating condition.
- Northern Pacific 245 preserved at the Lake Superior Railroad Museum in Duluth, currently painted as North Shore Scenic Railroad 245.
- Norfolk & Western 514 was donated to the Roanoke Chapter of the National Railroad Historical Society in August 2024. This locomotive is one of two surviving unrebuilt former N&W GP9s.
- Grand Trunk Western 4570 was acquired by the Steam Railroading Institute in Owosso, Michigan on September 16, 2026.

== Gallery ==
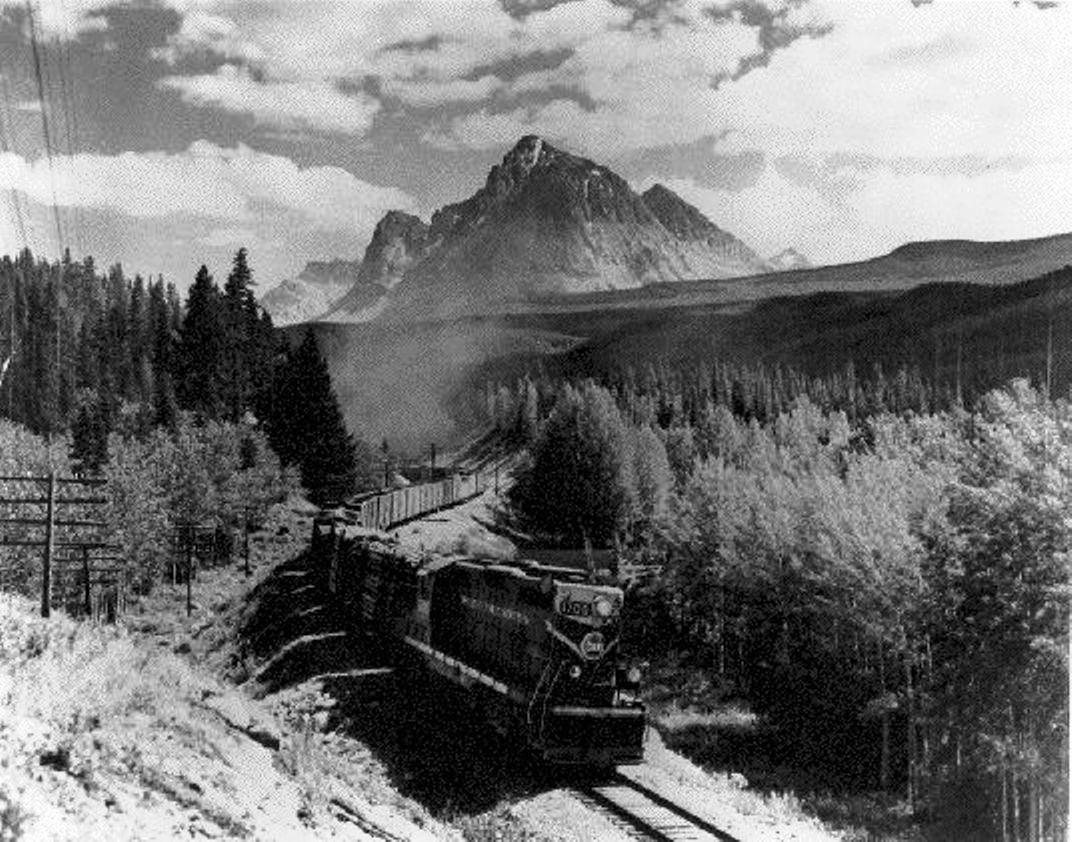
CN GP9 leads a train up Yellowhead Pass.

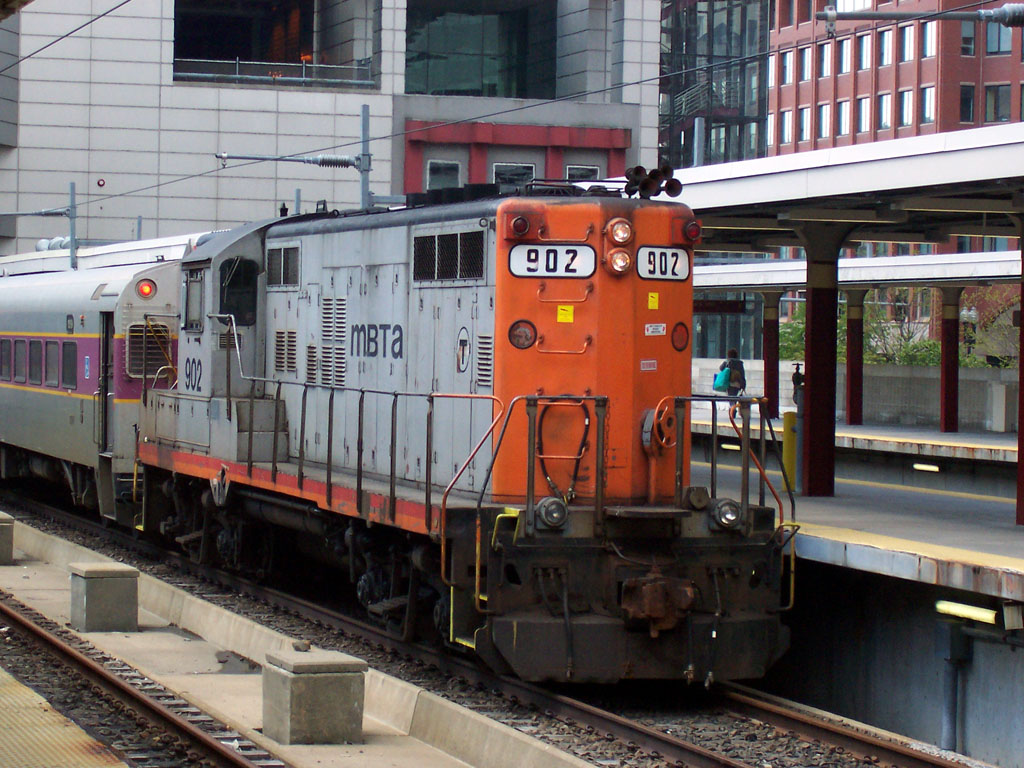
An MBTA GP9 locomotive making a non-revenue move into South Station in Boston, Massachusetts. This locomotive was retired by the MBTA in 2004 and is now on static display at the Illinois Railway Museum as of September 2014.

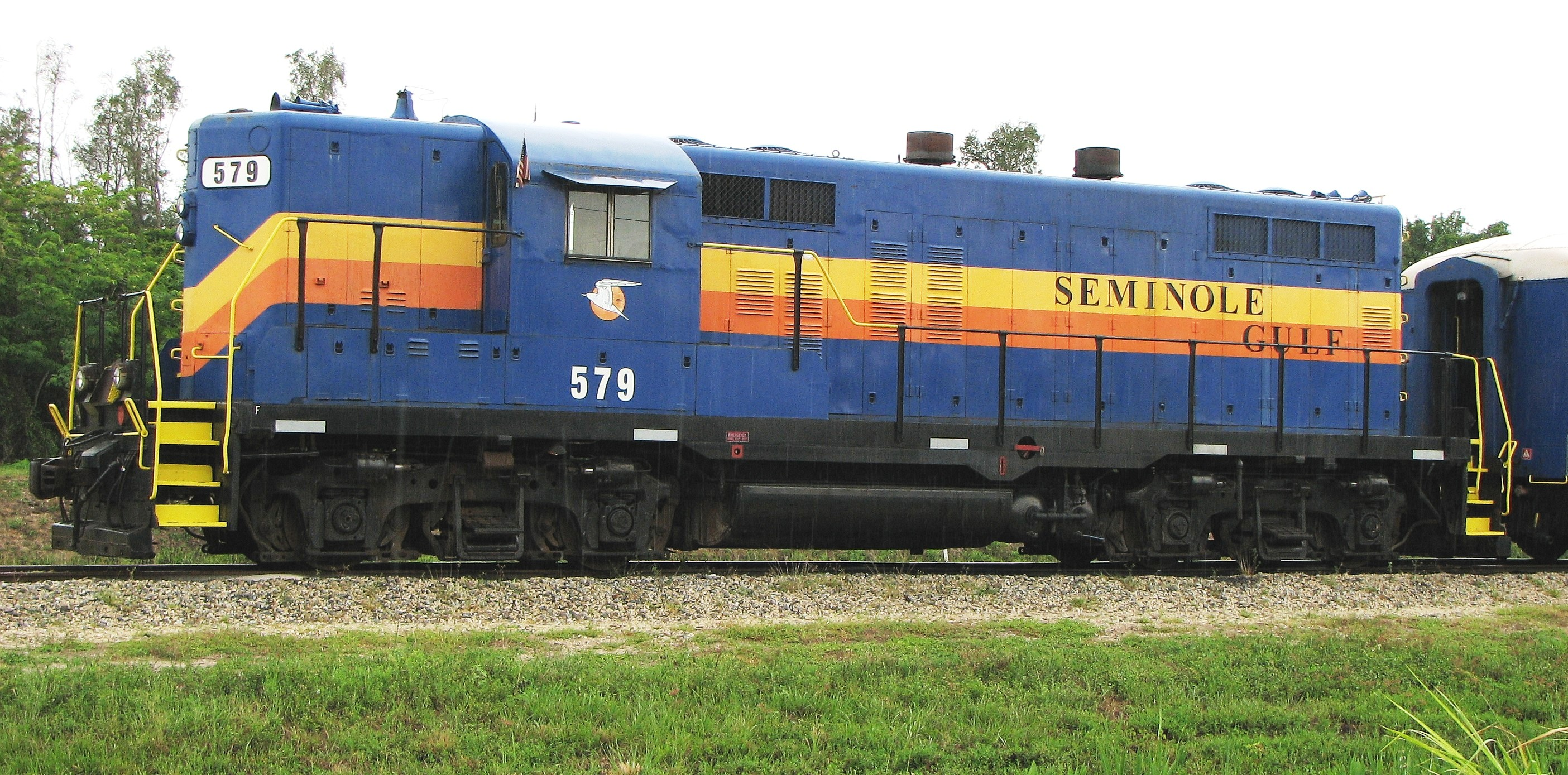
A modified EMD GP9 of the Seminole Gulf Railway, Fort Myers, Florida.

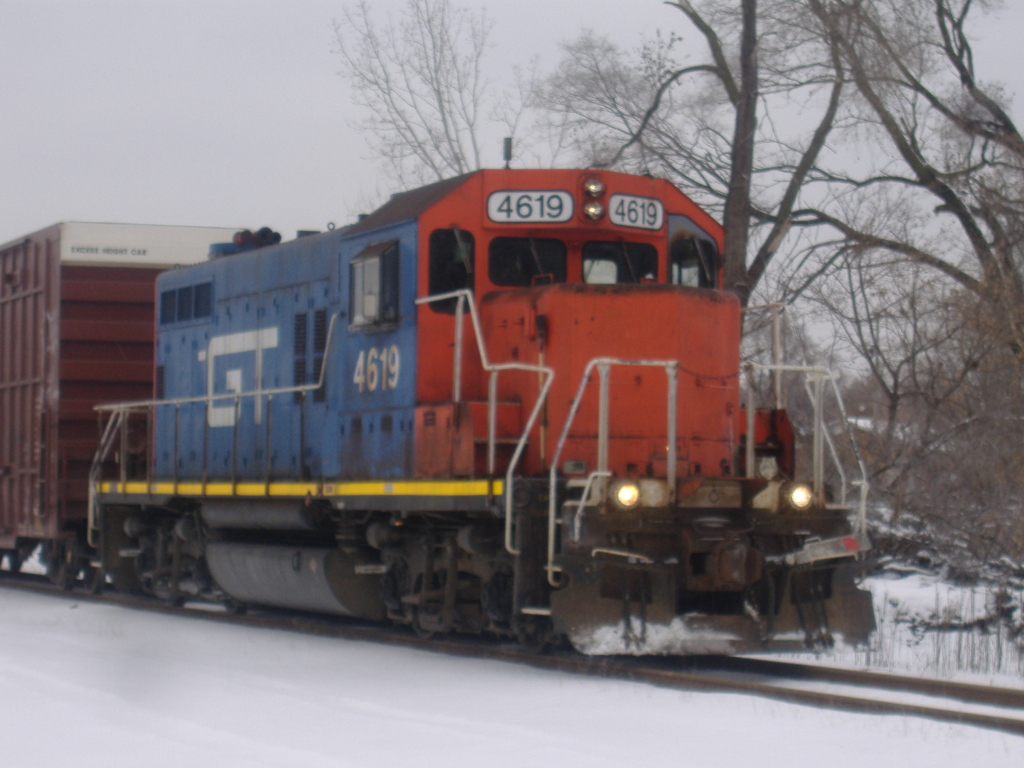
This GTW rebuilt GP9 4619 is heading south on the Kalamazoo spur in Kalamazoo, MI.

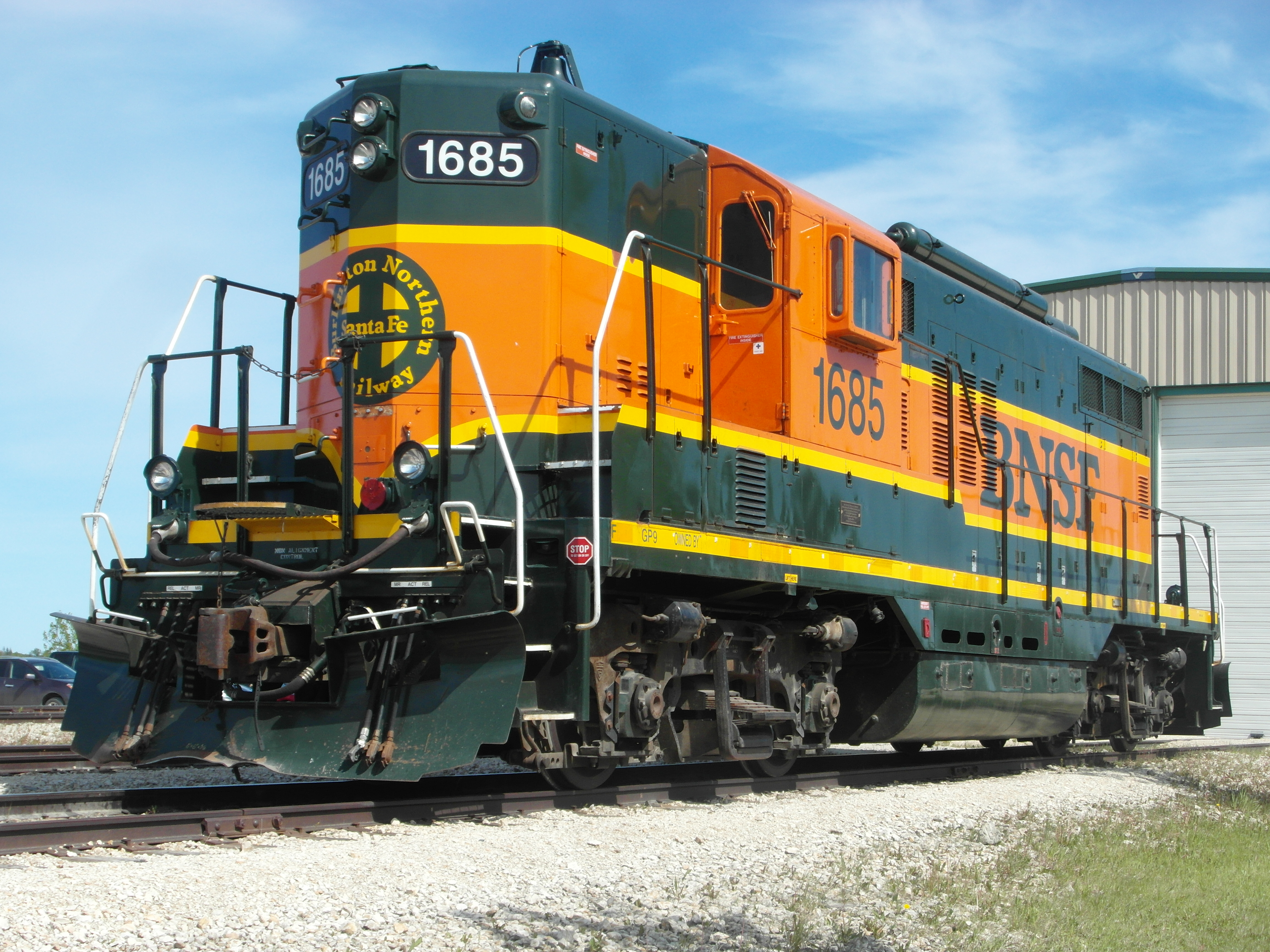
Former BNSF 1685 high hood GP9 sitting in the Prairie Dog Central Yard. This was the last GP9 on the BNSF roster.

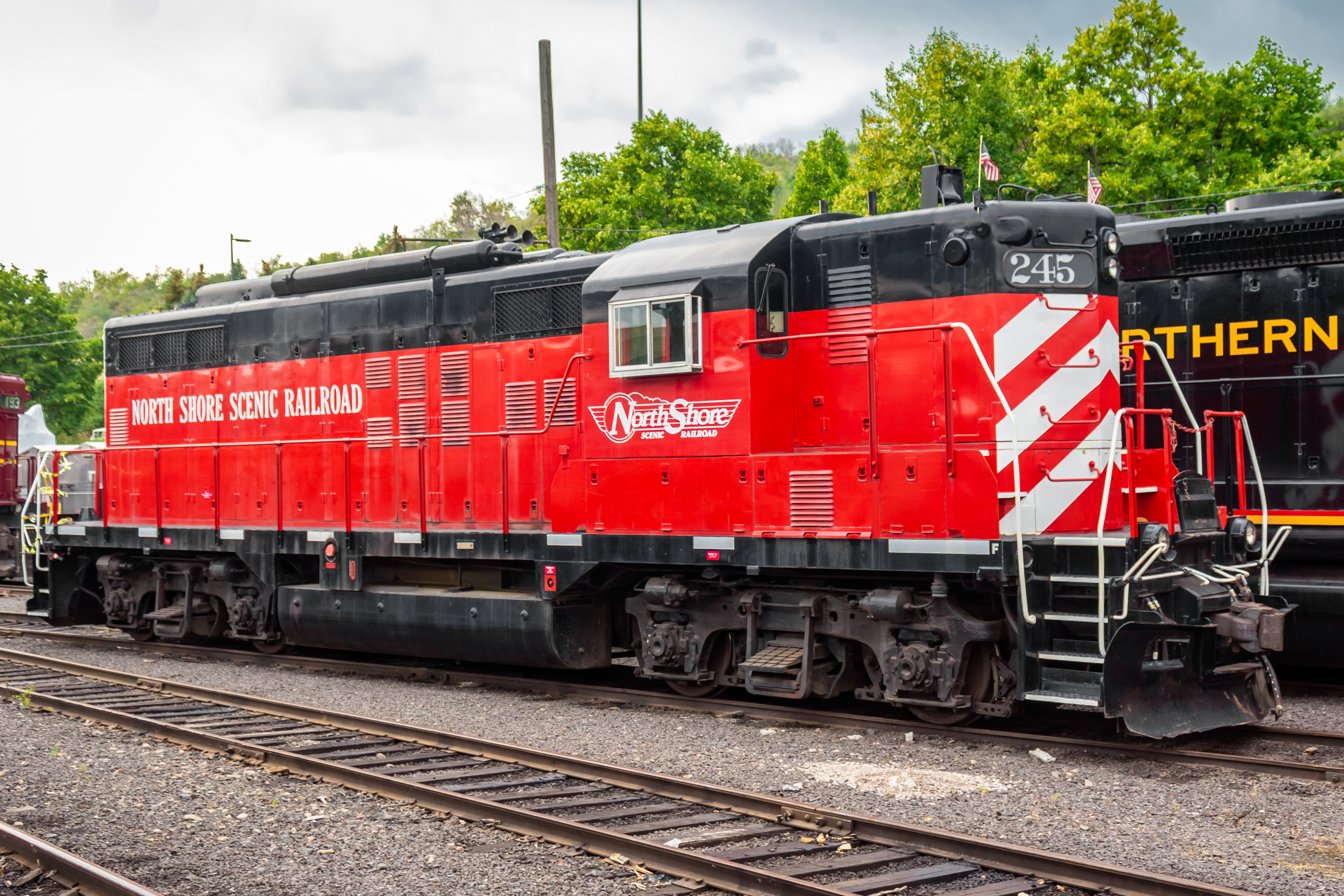
Former Northern Pacific 245, operational on the North Shore Scenic Railroad in Duluth, Minnesota.

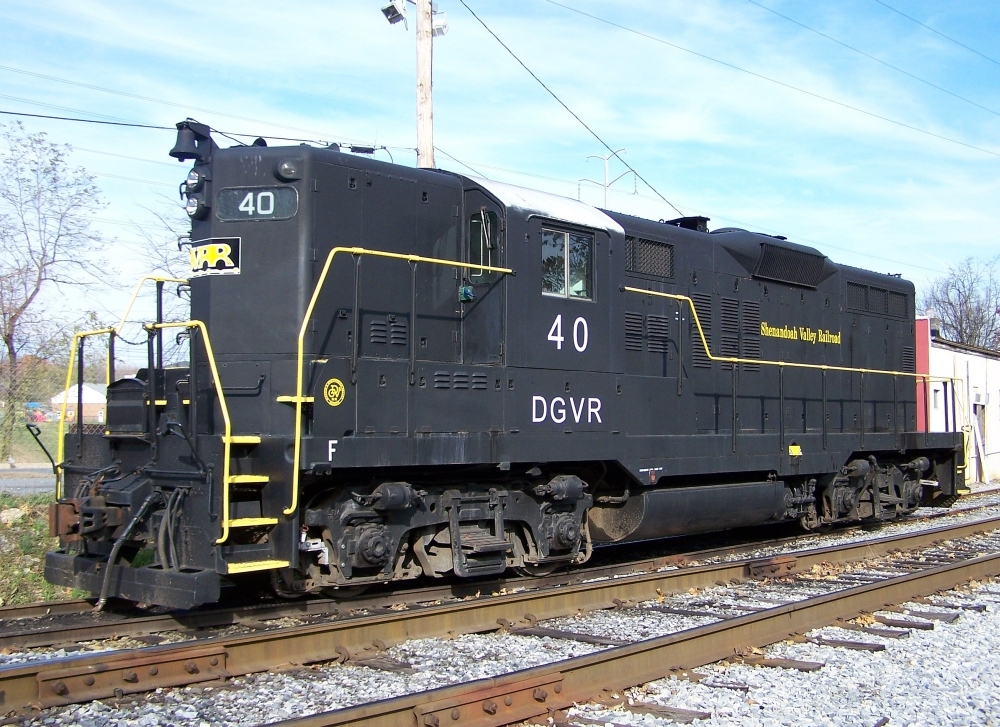
An EMD GP9 equipped with dynamic brakes on the Shenandoah Valley Railroad in Staunton, Virginia

== See also ==
- List of EMD locomotives
- List of GMD Locomotives
