= Okanagan Valley Railway =

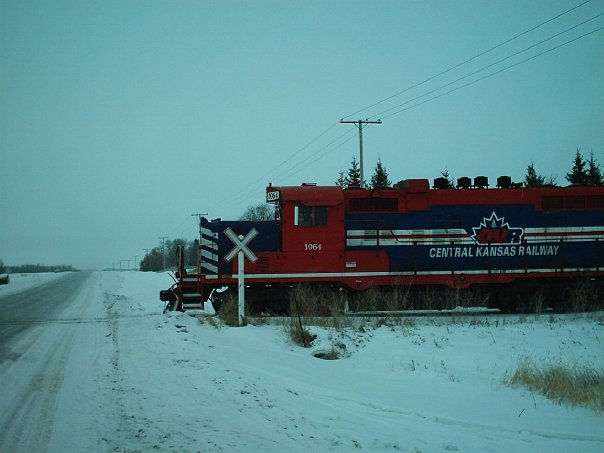
- Okanagan Valley Railway GP10 rolls past grade crossing near Prince Albert, Saskatchewan. (Locomotive was transferred to OmniTRAX subsidiary CTRW after shutdown of OKAN).

Overview
- Headquarters: Vernon, British Columbia
- Reporting mark: OKAN
- Locale: Okanagan Valley
- Dates of operation: 1998–2009

Technical
- Track gauge: 4 ft 8 1/2 in (1,435 mm) standard gauge

Okanagan Valley Railway (reporting mark OKAN) was a railroad operating former Canadian Pacific Railway track in the Okanagan region of British Columbia, Canada. Service commenced on November 22, 1998. OKAN's line ran from a CP connection at Sicamous to Vernon (46.3 miles). It also had trackage rights on Kelowna Pacific Railway's line (operating former CN track) from Vernon to Kelowna (33.4 miles) and from Lumby Junction to Lumby (14.4 miles). The railroad was owned by OmniTRAX.

Among the businesses served were forestry, farming, chemicals and cement. Okanagan Valley Railway's biggest customer was Owens-Illinois, Western Canada's only producer of glass beverage containers.

When the O-I glass plant closed in Spring 2009, OKAN lost most of its business and ultimately shut down on September 21, 2009.

== See also ==
- Kelowna Pacific Railway
