= Canadian National 3502 =

Canadian locomotive

Type and origin
- Power type: Diesel
- Builder: Montreal Locomotive Works
- Serial number: 6071-03
- Model: M-420W
- Build date: May 1973
Specifications
- Configuration
  - AAR: B-B
  - UIC: Bo-Bo
- Gauge: 1,435 mm (4 ft 8 1/2 in) standard gauge
- Trucks: Zero Weight-Transfer
- Wheel diameter: 40 in (1,016 mm)
- Minimum curve: 30°
- Wheelbase: 9 ft 4 in (2.8 m)
- Length: 61 ft (18.6 m)
- Width: 10 ft 4 in (3.1 m)
- Height: 15 ft 6 in (4.7 m)
- Loco weight: 272,000 lb (123,377 kg)
- Fuel type: Diesel
- Fuel capacity: 2,500 US gal (9,464 L)
- Lubricant cap.: 216 US gal (818 L)
- Coolant cap.: 260 US gal (984 L)
- Sandbox cap.: 56 cu ft (2 m^{3})
- Prime mover: ALCO 251C
- RPM
  - RPM idle: 450
  - Maximum RPM: 1050
- Engine type: Four-stroke diesel
- Aspiration: (1) Turbocharger
- Displacement: 10.95 L (668.2 cu in) per cylinder
- Alternator: GE Exciter GY2P7
- Generator: Main GE GTA17; Auxiliary GE 553 GY27
- Traction motors: (4) GE 752 PC6
- Cylinders: 12, V-arrangement
- Cylinder size: Bore x Stroke 9 in × 10.5 in (229 mm × 267 mm)
- Transmission: Diesel-electric
- Gear ratio: 65:18
- MU working: Yes
Performance figures
- Maximum speed: 67 mph (108 km/h)
- Power output: 2,000 hp (1,491 kW)
- Tractive effort
  - Starting: 60,400 lbf (268.67 kN)
  - Continuous: 50,000 lbf (222.41 kN)
Career
- First run: 1973
- Last run: 2007
- Scrapped: 2007
- Disposition: Scrapped

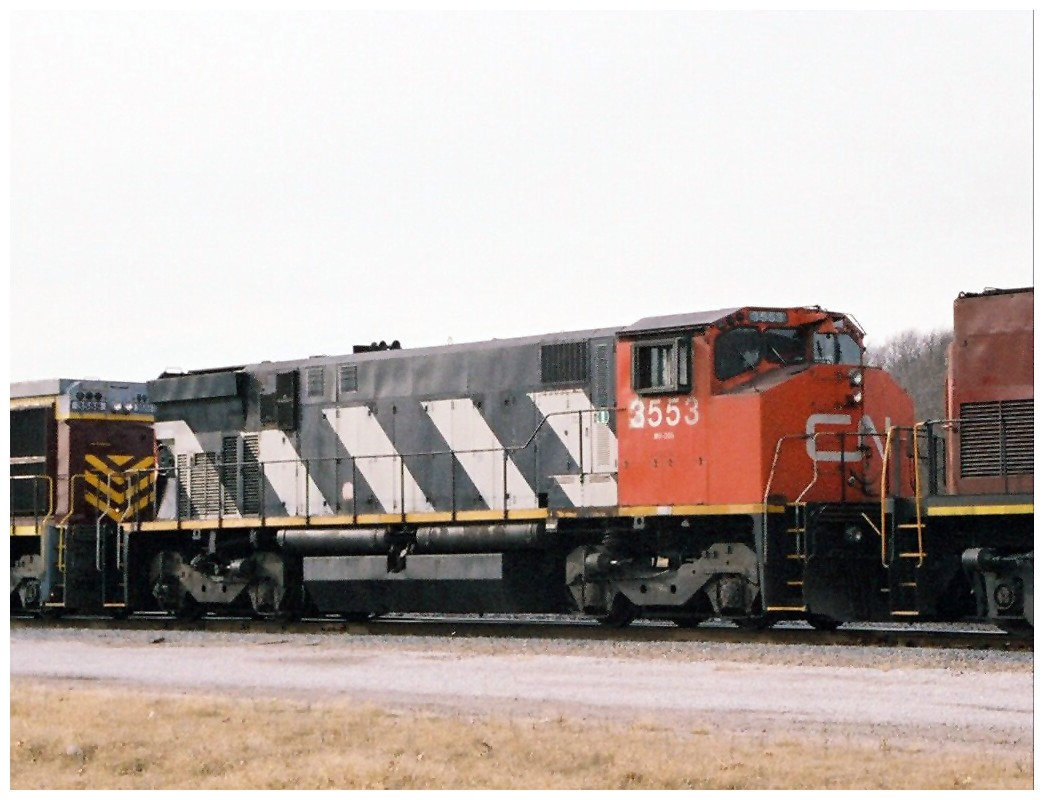
CN 3553, an MLW M420. Although not the same unit, it is the same locomotive model.

Canadian National 3502 was an MLW M-420W diesel-electric locomotive that was owned and operated by the Canadian National Railway (CN) and which became famous when it served as an emergency generator for the city of Boucherville, Quebec, during a severe icestorm in 1998.

== General history ==
CN 3502 (s/n 6071-03) was built in May 1973 by the Montreal Locomotive Works as an M-420W diesel-electric locomotive. It was built as part of a batch of CN units, with CN 3502 being order number 4929.

After entering revenue service with CN, the locomotive initially had the running number 2502. It was renumbered with the running number 3502 in 1987, after having its fuel and sandbox capacity reduced. These modifications were removed in 1994, with the locomotive retaining its new running number.

In 1998, after being repaired from its use as a generator in Boucherville, CN 3502 was sold to the Ottawa Valley Railway. In 1999 the locomotive was sold again, this time going to the Southern Ontario Railway, where it would remain until 2003 when it was sold to the Hudson Bay Railway. It remained in use with the Hudson Bay Railway until 2007, when it was withdrawn and scrapped.

== Use as an emergency generator ==
During the ice storms of 1998, the town of Boucherville, QC had lost power after repeated severe ice storms. The mayor needed emergency and essential services back up and running, so the mayor requested that CN deliver a locomotive to a level crossing close to the town hall. After arriving, the locomotive was then hoisted off the tracks by a large crane and put onto the streets, from where it was driven approximately 1,000 feet (305 m) under its own power to the city hall, carving grooves in the pavement as it moved. Once there it was attached to the city's power grid, becoming a portable power generator.

After being coupled to the power grid the locomotive was set to produce 375 kW of power at 60 hertz. This allowed the locomotive to provide power for both several municipal buildings, and emergency services. Once grid power was restored on January 17, 1998, the locomotive was driven back to the tracks and put back on the rails. Afterwards the locomotive had to be repaired to fix the damage sustained by the running gear and other components due to being driven on the road.

=== CN 3508 ===
Another CN M-420, this time CN 3508, was also lifted from the tracks with the intention of using its output to power a local high school that was to be used as an emergency warming station for local residents. However getting to the shelter would have required CN 3508 to cross an overpass, and it was eventually decided that there was a very good chance the overpass would collapse under the weight of the 117.93 t (116.07 long tons; 130.00 short tons) locomotive, leaving the city with yet another emergency to deal with, and some concerned phone calls from the Canadian National Railway. As a result, CN 3508 was left parked down the street on Boulevard de Montarville as an emergency backup until the power grid was restored.

Afterwards CN 3508 was returned to the rails and serviced as it too required repairs, having suffered minor damage to its running gear.

=== Technical aspects ===
Both of the locomotives were powered by ALCO 251C 131.4 L (8,020 cu in), four-stroke, single-turbo V12 diesel prime movers which were capable of producing a maximum of 2,400 hp (1,800 kW) each.

Under normal circumstances these massive engines drove a General Electric GTA17 generator that would supply traction current to the four traction motors which were in turn driving the wheels. However, as shown by their use in Boucherville, this power can be redirected for uses outside of the locomotive like powering municipal buildings. To provide power in this circumstance, the V12 prime mover had to be set to run at a specific, constant rpm to generate alternating current at 60 hertz, the frequency used by most North American utilities.

During its multi-day use as an emergency generator, CN 3502s prime mover continuously produced 375 kilowatts (503 hp) of AC power for use by the municipal buildings and emergency services.
