= Bombardier HR-412 =

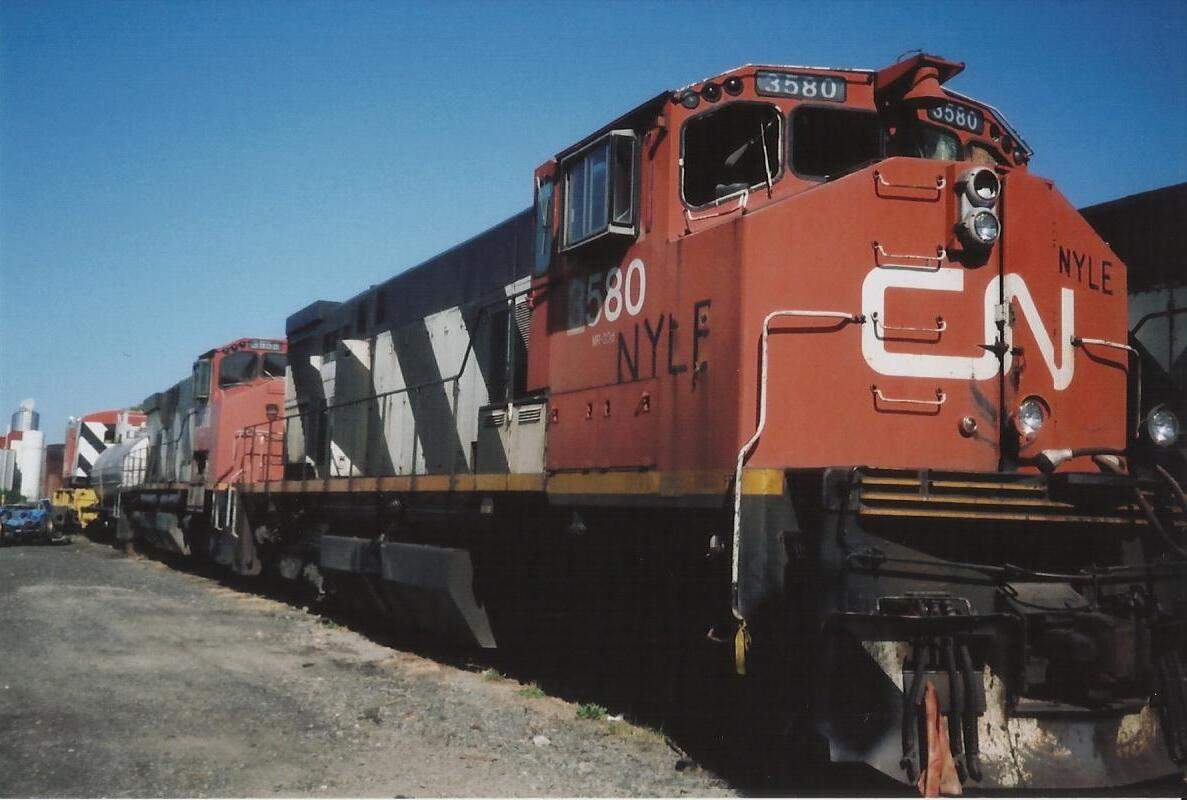
Type and origin
- Power type: Diesel-electric
- Builder: Bombardier
- Serial number: M6115-01 to M6115-10
- Model: HR-412
- Build date: September 1981–May 1982
- Total produced: 11
Specifications
- Configuration
  - AAR: B-B
  - UIC: Bo′Bo′
- Gauge: 4 ft 8 1/2 in (1,435 mm)
- Wheel diameter: 40 inches (1.0 m)
- Minimum curve: 30°
- Wheelbase: Between truck centers: 47 ft 7 in (14.50 m); Truck wheelbase: 9 ft 4 in (2.84 m)
- Length: 61 feet 0 inches (18.59 m)
- Width: 10 feet 5 inches (3.18 m)
- Height: Cab roof: 14 ft 11 in (4.55 m); Overall: 15 ft 7 in (4.75 m)
- Loco weight: 260,000 lb (120,000 kg) or 136 short tons (121 long tons; 123 t)
- Fuel type: Diesel
- Fuel capacity: 2,000 US gal (7,600 L)
- Lubricant cap.: 160 US gal (610 L)
- Coolant cap.: 200 US gal (760 L)
- Sandbox cap.: 56 cu ft (1.6 m^{3})
- Prime mover: ALCO 12-251C
- RPM range: 450 - 1050
- Engine type: V12 4-stroke diesel
- Aspiration: Mechanically-assisted turbocharger
- Generator: GE GTA17
- Cylinders: 12
- Cylinder size: 9 in (23 cm) diameter × 10 1/2 in (27 cm) stroke
- Loco brake: Straight air, Dynamic
- Train brakes: 26-L air
Performance figures
- Maximum speed: 67 mph (108 km/h)
- Power output: 2,000 hp (1.5 MW)
- Tractive effort: 50,000 lbf (222 kN)
Career
- Operators: Canadian National Railway
- Class: MR-20d
- Numbers: 2580-2589 (later 3580-3589)
- Locale: North America
- Retired: 1995-1998
- Disposition: Most scrapped, some may still be in service on shortlines

The Bombardier HR-412, also known as the MLW HR-412, was a 4 axle, 2,000 horsepower (1.5 MW) freight locomotive manufactured in Montreal, Quebec, Canada. Ten were built for Canadian National Railway in between September and November 1981, numbered 2580–2589, and one was built for Bombardier as a demonstrator in May 1982, numbered BBD 7000. BBD 7000 was later sold to CANAC and renumbered CANX 3536 (not to be confused with CN's own 3536, an M-420).

The model designation stood for HR - High Reliability, 412 - 4 axles, 12 cylinder engine. The HR-412 was designed as the successor to the MLW M-420. None remain in service with CN

== See also ==
- List of MLW diesel locomotives
