= Northern Pacific Conference =

Northern Pacific Conference may refer to:

- Northern Pacific Conference (baseball), a 1975–1981 NCAA conference
- Northern Pacific Conference (women's), a 1982–1986 multi-sport NCAA conference
- Northern Pacific Field Hockey Conference, a 1982–2015 NCAA conference

== See also ==
- Northern Pacific (disambiguation)
