= Thunder Rail =

Short line railway in Saskatchewan, Canada

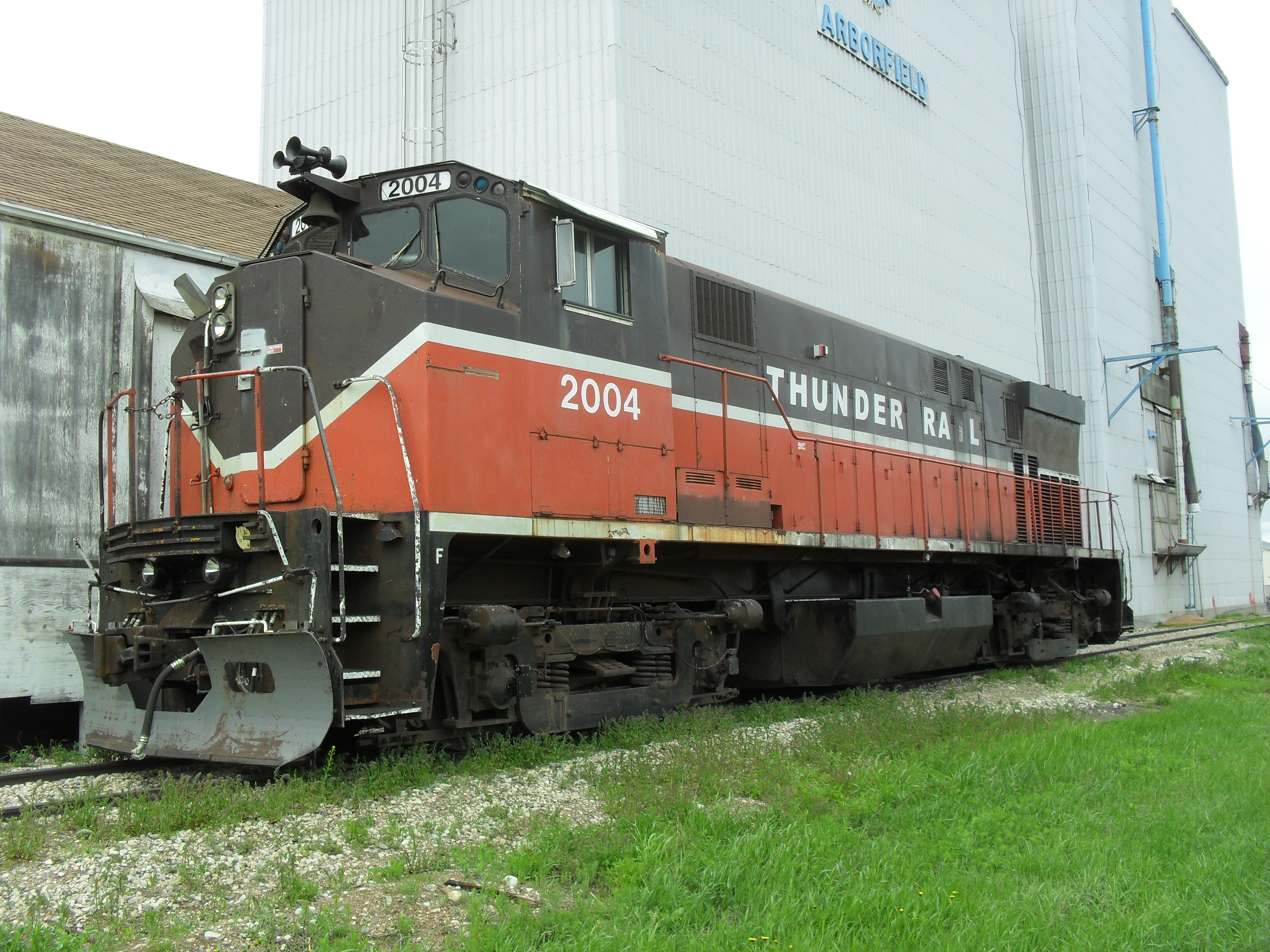
- M-420R #2004 of Thunder Rail at Arborfield, Thunder Rail HQ

Overview
- Headquarters: Arborfield, Saskatchewan
- Reporting mark: THR
- Locale: Northern Saskatchewan, Canada
- Dates of operation: 2005–Present
- Predecessor: Carlton Trail Railway

Technical
- Track gauge: 4 ft 8 1/2 in (1,435 mm) standard gauge
- Length: 19.5 miles (31.4 km)

Other
- Website: www.arborfieldsk.ca/thunder_rail.htm

Thunder Rail is a short line railway located in the North East region of Saskatchewan, with its headquarters located in the community of Arborfield. The line came into being when Carlton Trail Railway decided to abandon the line due to its isolated proximity from their headquarters in Prince Albert. CTRW worked with the community of Arborfield to ensure the line would not be removed, but instead could be owned and operated by the residents of Arborfield. In March 2005 Thunder Rail came into existence, utilizing former Providence and Worcester Railroad M-420R(W) locomotive #2004.

The track is predominantly used for hauling grain products like wheat, oats, barley, alfalfa pellets and more recently canola products. Customers include CanPro Ingredients Ltd., Arborfield Grain Producers and any farmer that wishes to load producer cars on the line. Thunder Rail also provides railcar storage on many seldom used spurs.
