= EMD GP20C-ECO =

B-B diesel-electric locomotive

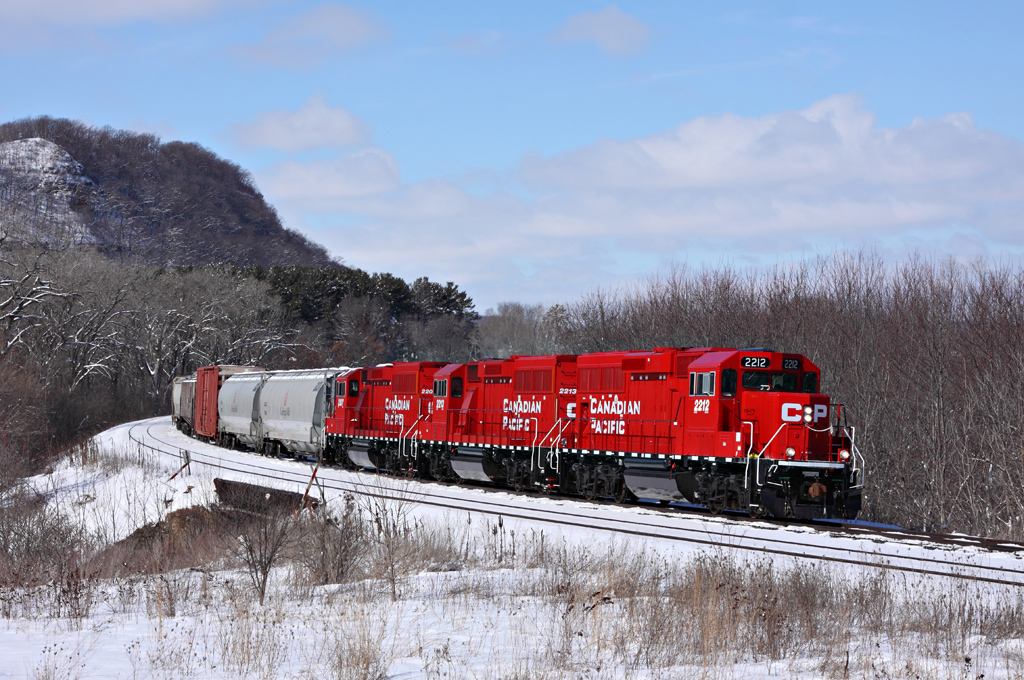
- 3 CP GP20C-ECOs lead a potash train near Lake City, Minnesota, US
Type and origin
- Power type: Diesel-electric
- Builder: Electro-Motive Diesel
- Model: GP20C-ECO
- Build date: 2013
- Total produced: 130
Specifications
- Configuration
  - AAR: B–B
  - UIC: Bo′Bo′
- Gauge: 4 ft 8 1/2 in (1,435 mm)
- Prime mover: EMD 8-710G3A
- Engine type: V8 diesel engine
- Aspiration: turbocharged
- Displacement: 710 cubic inches (11.6 liters) per cylinder
- Cylinders: 8
Performance figures
- Power output: 2,000 hp (1,490 kW)
Career
- Numbers: 2200–2329
- Locale: North America
- Current owner: Canadian Pacific Railway

The EMD GP20C-ECO is a 2,000-horsepower (1,500 kW) B-B diesel-electric locomotive built by EMD. Although similar to the EMD GP22ECO, the GP20C-ECO follows Canadian Pacific's request for crashworthiness and EPA emission standards with the "C" in the designation denoting crashworthiness of the cab, frame, and fuel tank. Canadian Pacific (CP) requested relaxed emission standards (Tier 0+ instead of Tier 2) to cut costs.

GP20C-ECOs use just enough rebuilt components to designate them a rebuild. The GP20C-ECOs feature a new frame, fuel tank, prime mover, long hood, and cab with CP providing trucks, and alternator (along with many other smaller components), mainly from retired CP GP9us, that are rebuilt and reused in the locomotives. The units feature a long hood similar to that of a GP60 and are distinguished by a snoot nose with sharper angles, which set the cab back slightly on the frame to make room for the additional length. As with the SD30C-ECOs, the GP20C-ECOs are equipped with all-LED lighting, except for the headlights and ditch lights.

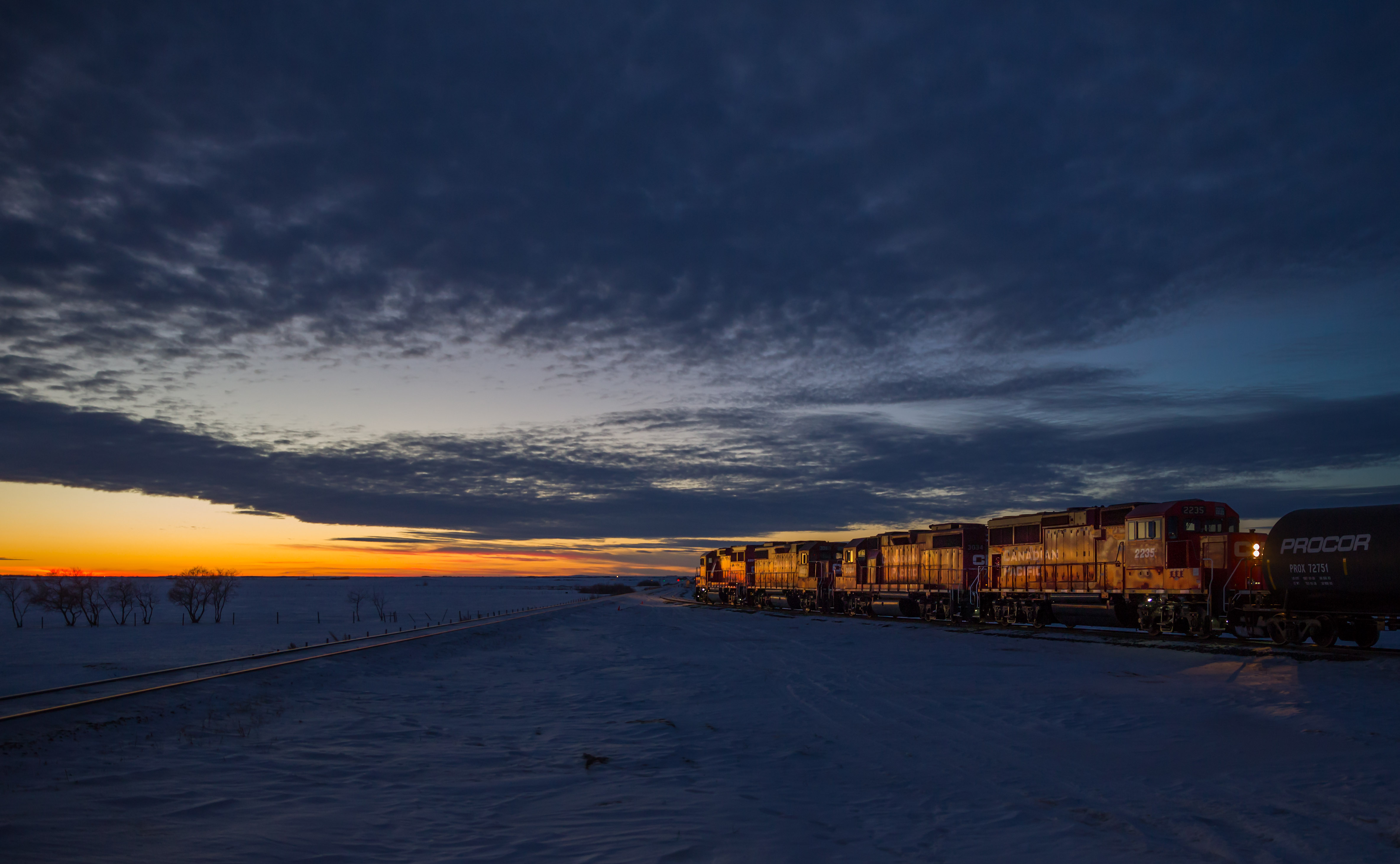
Shunting tank cars at Wilkie, Saskatchewan, Canada(1st and 4th locos are GP20C-ECOs)

The GP20C-ECOs should not be confused with a limited number of "GP20C" locomotives. These were former Great Northern GP20s rebuilt by Ziegler in 1989 (Ziegler was a Minneapolis-based Caterpillar dealer). The C in the name referred to their new Caterpillar engines. Only ten of these locomotives were produced.

== Owners ==
A total of 130 GP20C-ECOs have been built for Canadian Pacific in three orders. The first order was for 30 locomotives numbered 2200–2229, the second order was for an additional 40 locomotives numbered 2230–2269, and the third order was for an additional 60 locomotives numbered 2270–2329.
