= Northern Pacific =

Northern Pacific may refer to:

- Northern Pacific Ocean
- Northern Pacific Airways, an Alaska-based charter airline
- Northern Pacific Conference (disambiguation)
- Northern Pacific Depot (disambiguation)
- Northern Pacific Hockey League, an American Tier III junior ice hockey league 2000–2016
- Northern Pacific Railway, a defunct American transcontinental railroad
