= MLW M-420 =

Canadian diesel locomotive

MLW M-420, M-424
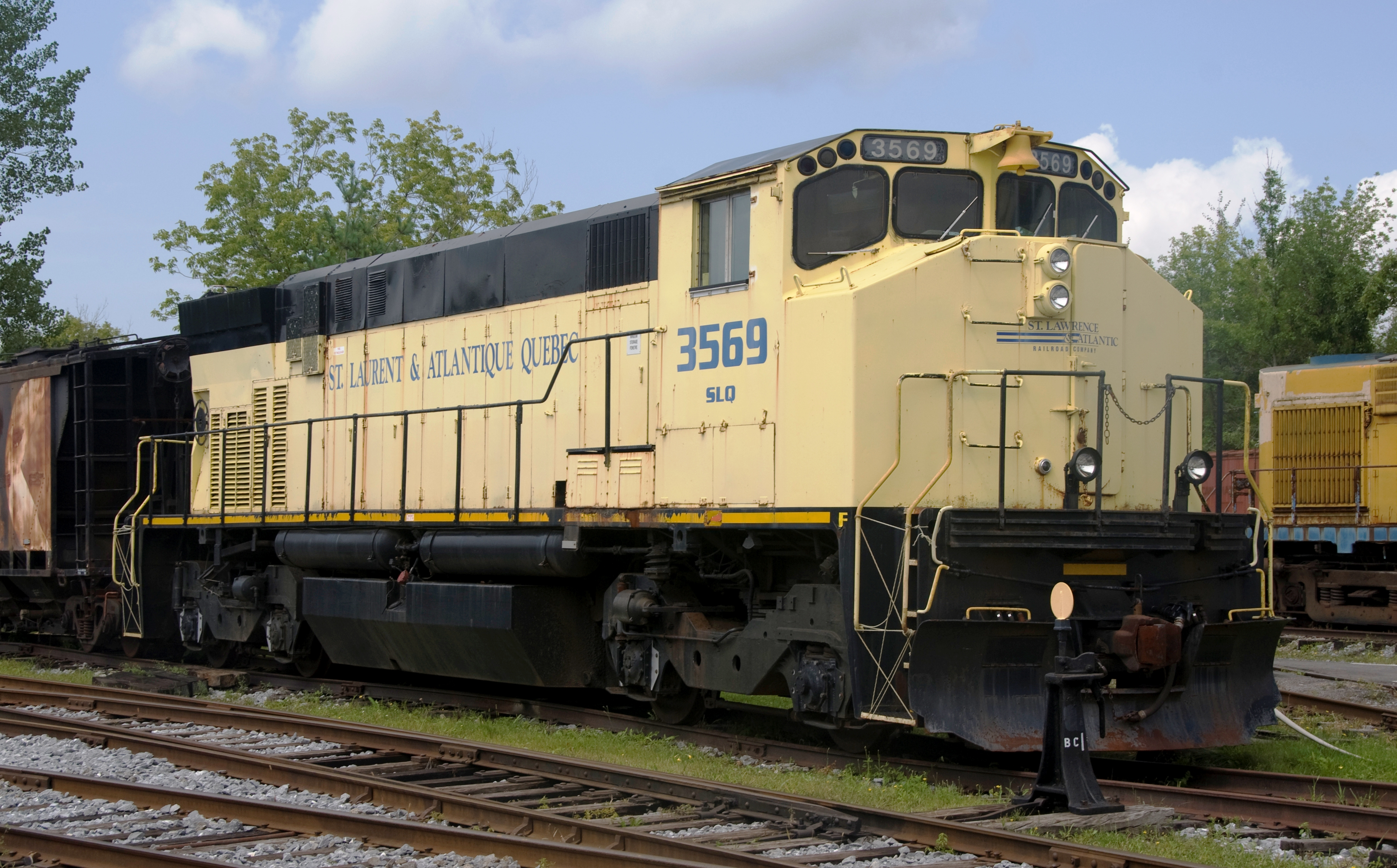
- M420 #3569 of St Lawrence & Atlantic Railroad
Type and origin
- Power type: Diesel-electric
- Builder: Montreal Locomotive Works
- Build date: May 1973 - February 1977; July 1980 - August 1981
- Total produced: 112 A-units; 8 B-units M-420; 72 M-424
Specifications
- Configuration
  - AAR: B-B
  - UIC: Bo-Bo
- Gauge: 1,435 mm (4 ft 8 1/2 in) standard gauge
- Trucks: Zero Weight-Transfer
- Wheel diameter: 40 in (1,016 mm)
- Minimum curve: 30°
- Wheelbase: 9 ft 4 in (2.8 m)
- Length: 61 ft (18.6 m)
- Width: 10 ft 4 in (3.1 m)
- Height: 15 ft 6 in (4.7 m)
- Loco weight: 272,000 lb (123,377 kg)
- Fuel type: Diesel
- Fuel capacity: 2,500 US gal (9,464 L)
- Lubricant cap.: 216 US gal (818 L)
- Coolant cap.: 260 US gal (984 L)
- Sandbox cap.: 56 cu ft (2 m^{3})
- Prime mover: ALCO 251C
- RPM
  - RPM idle: 450
  - Maximum RPM: 1050
- Engine type: Four-stroke diesel
- Aspiration: (1) Turbocharger
- Displacement: 10.95 L (668.2 cu in) per cylinder
- Alternator: GE Exciter GY2P7
- Generator: Main GE GTA17; Auxiliary GE 553 GY27
- Traction motors: (4) GE 752 PC6
- Cylinders: 12, V-arrangement
- Cylinder size: Bore x Stroke 9 in × 10.5 in (229 mm × 267 mm)
- Transmission: Diesel-electric
- Gear ratio: 65:18
- MU working: Yes
Performance figures
- Maximum speed: 67 mph (108 km/h)
- Power output: 2,000 hp (1,491 kW)
- Tractive effort
  - Starting: 60,400 lbf (268.67 kN)
  - Continuous: 50,000 lbf (222.41 kN)
Career
- Locale: North America, Venezuela
- Primary Technical Reference Secondary Technical Reference

The MLW M-420 was a diesel-electric locomotive manufactured between 1973 and 1977 in Montreal, Canada by the Montreal Locomotive Works. A total of 90 units were built for Canadian railways, including eight B units built for the British Columbia Railway; most of production went to Canadian National. Only seven units were sold outside of Canada, to the State Railways Institution in Venezuela and the Providence and Worcester Railroad in the United States.

The M-420 was one of the first locomotive models (along with the EMD GP38-2) to use the wide-nosed Canadian comfort cab, pioneered by Canadian National. By the early 1990s, variations on this cab design had become the standard of the industry. As with wide-nosed General Motors Diesel units from the same period, references to the model commonly add a "W" at the end of the model name, but it is not part of the official model designation. Most M-420 units rode on MLW ZWT (Zero Weight-Transfer) trucks.

== Variations ==
Other variations of the M-420 were the M-420R, the M-424 built for service in Mexico and the M-420TR switcher. Five examples of the slightly different M-420R were built for the newly-independent Providence and Worcester Railroad (P&W) from 1974 to 1975 using trade-in parts and Type B trucks. The M-424 was an M-420 with dynamic brakes uprated to 2,400 horsepower (1.79 MW). The M-420TR was built in two variations, with two M-420TR units sold to Roberval & Saguenay and fifteen slightly different units (sometimes referred to as M-420TR-2) sold to Ferrocarril del Pacífico. Both M-420TR variations bore little resemblance to the other models, with a lowered hood, shorter frame and end-cab design. A cabless design, the M420B existed. British Columbia Railway was the only consumer of this variant.

== Operating history ==
The first Canadian National M-420 was delivered in 1973. They provided service on the eastern side of Canada until their retirement in the late 1990s. By the time they were retired, many units were over 20 years old, and major Canadian railroads were purging their rosters of MLW and Alco locomotives to replace them with newer EMD and GE units. Bombardier HR-412s, purchased by CN and designed as successor to the M-420, were retired at the same time. The Providence and Worcester Railroad sold off its M-420Rs in 1994.

=== Service as power generators in Winter 1998 ===
During the winter of 1998, a severe ice storm cut off power to many homes and businesses in Ontario and Quebec. CN M-420 3502 was hoisted off the rails by crane and rolled along a street in Boucherville in order to provide power in the community. The engine was driven approximately 1,000 feet (305 m) under its own power to the city hall, where it then became a portable power generator. M-420 3508 was also lifted from the tracks to provide power to a school being used as a shelter, but problems prevented this from happening, and 3508 remained on standby. Both engines suffered minor gear case damage and carved grooves in the pavement.

=== Secondhand owners ===
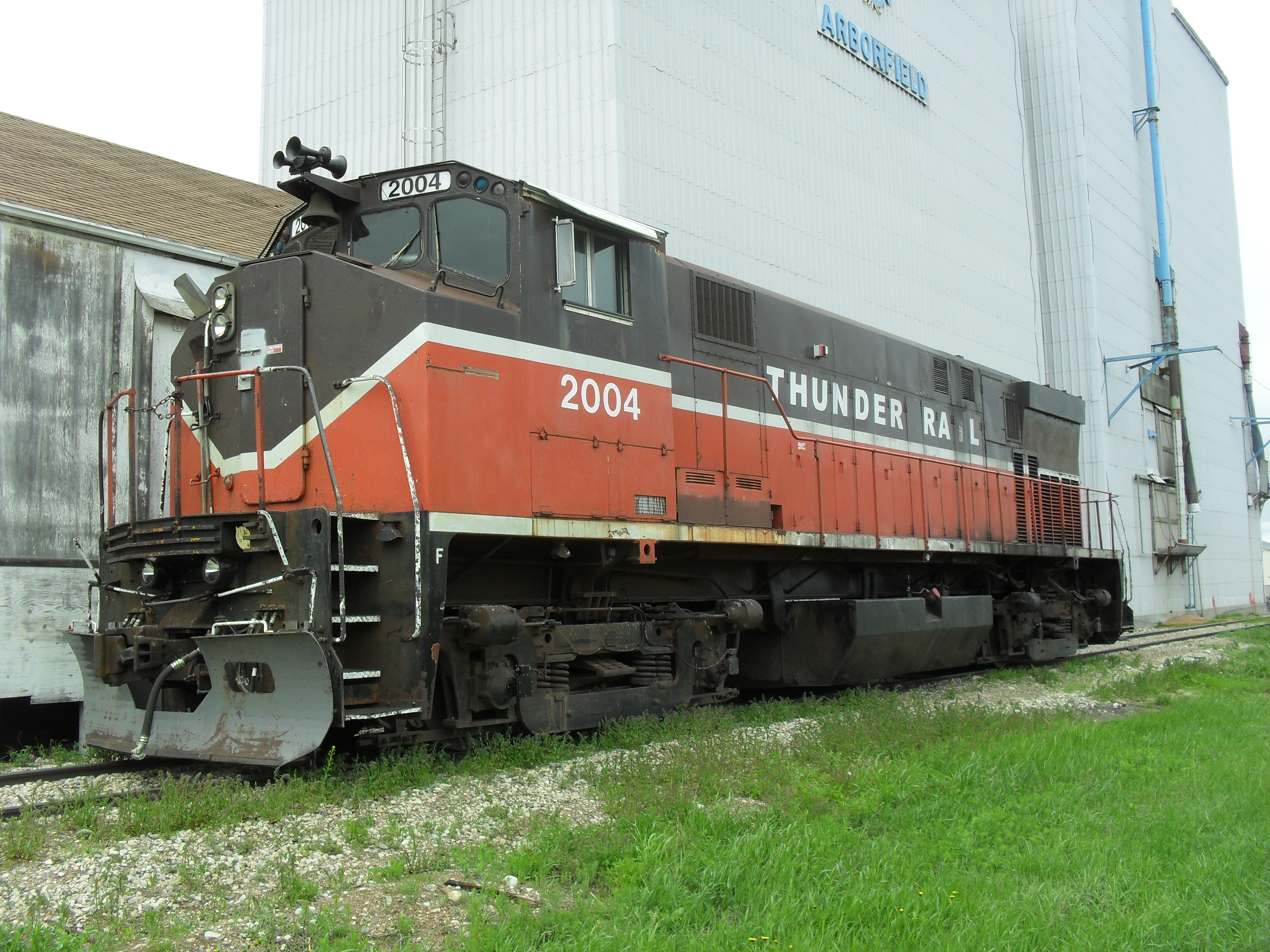
A Thunder Rail M-420R in 2010, still wearing Providence and Worcester Railroad colors

Following their retirement from CN, P&W, and BC Rail, some M-420 units were scrapped, but many were sold to shortline railways across North America for continued service. Omnitrax purchased several units, including some of the M-420B units from BC Rail. Larger shortlines such as Omnitrax have begun to scrap or sell their MLW units as a result of increased maintenance and reliability issues. The St. Lawrence and Atlantic Railroad used a fleet of eleven former CN M-420 units as road power from 1998 to 2001. The Great Western Railway in Saskatchewan used an entire roster of MLW M-420s until 2017 when they announced that they are replacing the MLW fleet with GE fleet.

== Original owners ==
M-420

Image	Railroad	Quantity	Road numbers	Notes
	Canadian National	80	2500–2579	
	British Columbia Railway	16	640-647 & 681-688	681-688 are cabless B units
	F.C. de Venezuela	2	M001, M002	
	Providence and Worcester Railroad	5	2001–2005	M-420R
	Roberval & Saguenay	2	26, 27	M-420TR
	Ferrocarril del Pacífico	15	522-536	M-420TR

M-424

Image	Railroad	Quantity	Road numbers	Notes
	Ferrocarril del Pacífico	16	560-575	
	Ferrocaril Unidos del Sureste	3	525-527	
	National de Mexico	53	9500-9552	

== See also ==
- List of MLW diesel locomotives
