= EMD GP10 =

Rebuilt locomotive class

EMD/Illinois Central GP10
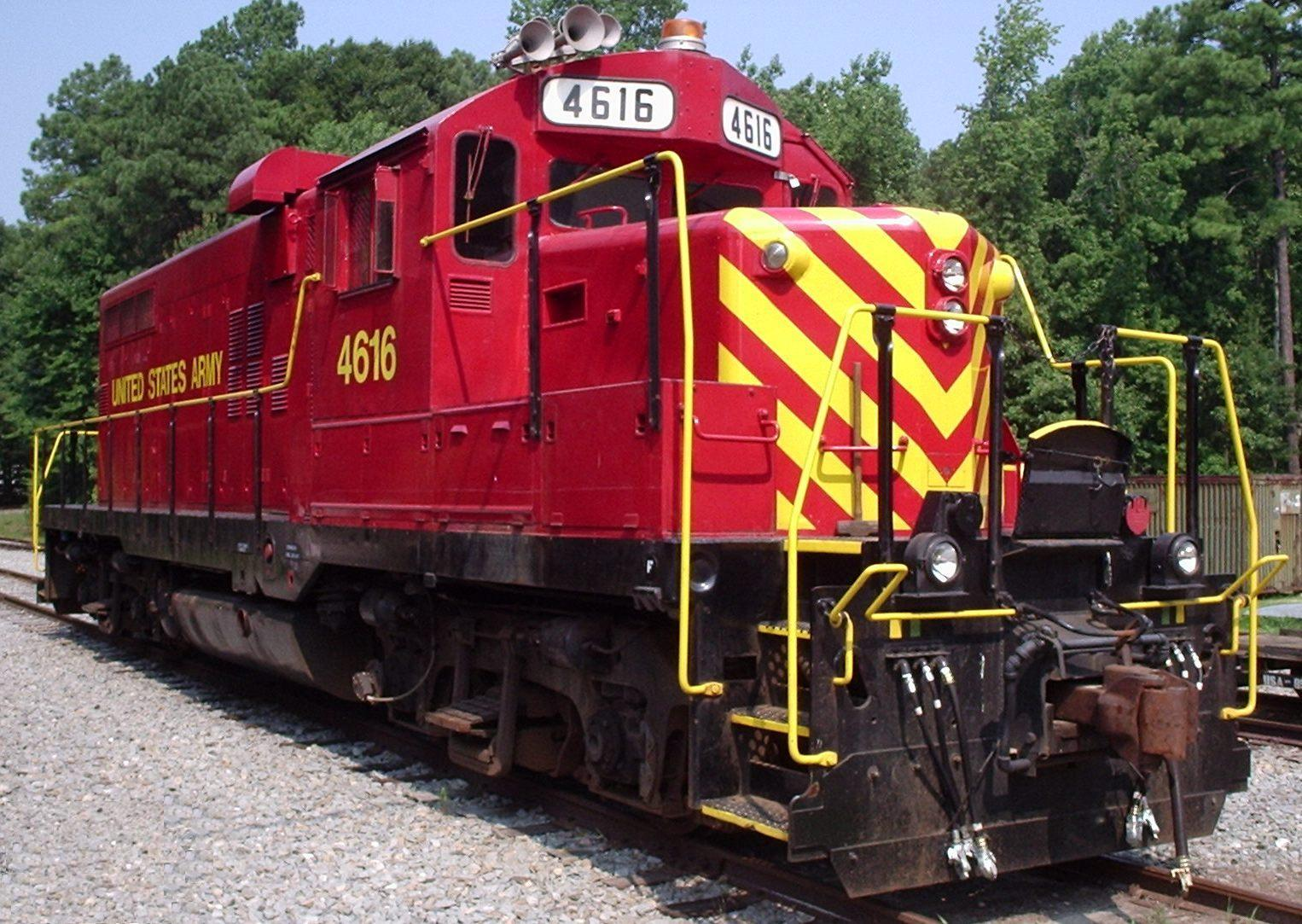
Type and origin
- Power type: Diesel-electric
- Builder: General Motors Electro-Motive Division (EMD)
- Build date: 1967–1979
- Rebuilder: General Motors Electro-Motive Division (EMD); Illinois Central Railroad's Paducah, Kentucky shops
Specifications
- Configuration
  - AAR: B-B
- Gauge: 4 ft 8 1/2 in (1,435 mm)
- Prime mover: EMD 16-567C
- Train brakes: Air, schedule 26-L
Performance figures
- Power output: 1,750 or 1,850 hp (1.30 or 1.38 MW)

The EMD GP10 is a diesel-electric locomotive that is the result of rebuilding a GP7, GP9 or GP18.

The Illinois Central Railroad had three separate rebuild programs to upgrade their old EMD GPs and GPs that they had purchased from equipment dealers such as Precision National Corporation in Mount Vernon, Illinois. The first was the GP8, second the GP10 and third the GP11. All were rebuilt at IC/ICG's Paducah Shops in Kentucky.

Core units for the GP10 program were from IC/ICG GP7, GP8, GP9 and GP18, B&M GP9, B&O GP9, CRR GP9, C&O GP7 and GP9, D&RGW GP9, DT&I GP7 and GP9, FEC GP9, GTW GP18, P&LE GP7, Potlach Forests Inc. GP7, QNS&L GP9, RDG GP7, St.J&LC GP9, SLSF GP7, SP GP9, SSW GP7, and UP GP9B.

Two IC GP9s were rebuilt to GP10s and sold directly to the Ashley, Drew and Northern Railway. Nine Alaska Railroad GP7s were rebuilt to GP10s by Paducah, and renumbered 1801-1809 (these rebuilds received EMD angled cabs but kept their AAR Type B road trucks from Alco RS-1s).

A total of 76 Conrail GP9s were rebuilt to GP10s. The Paducah Shops rebuilt 53 Conrail GP9s to GP10s. The first 16 Conrail GP9s were rebuilt to the equivalent of a GP10 in 1976. In 1978 another 21 Conrail GP9s were rebuilt at Paducah, followed by 16 more GP9s rebuilt to GP10 in 1979. The 1978–79 Conrail GP9 rebuilding program by Paducah was engine and electrical gear only with no carbody modification (the high short hoods were kept). The Precision National Corporation Shops at Mount Vernon, Illinois rebuilt six Conrail GP9s to GP10s in 1978. The Morrison-Knudsen Boise Shops rebuilt 17 Conrail GP9s to GP10s in 1978–1979. Six units were rebuilt by Boise in 1978, with an additional 11 units completed in 1979. The GP9 rebuilding program by Boise was engine and electrical gear only with no carbody modification.

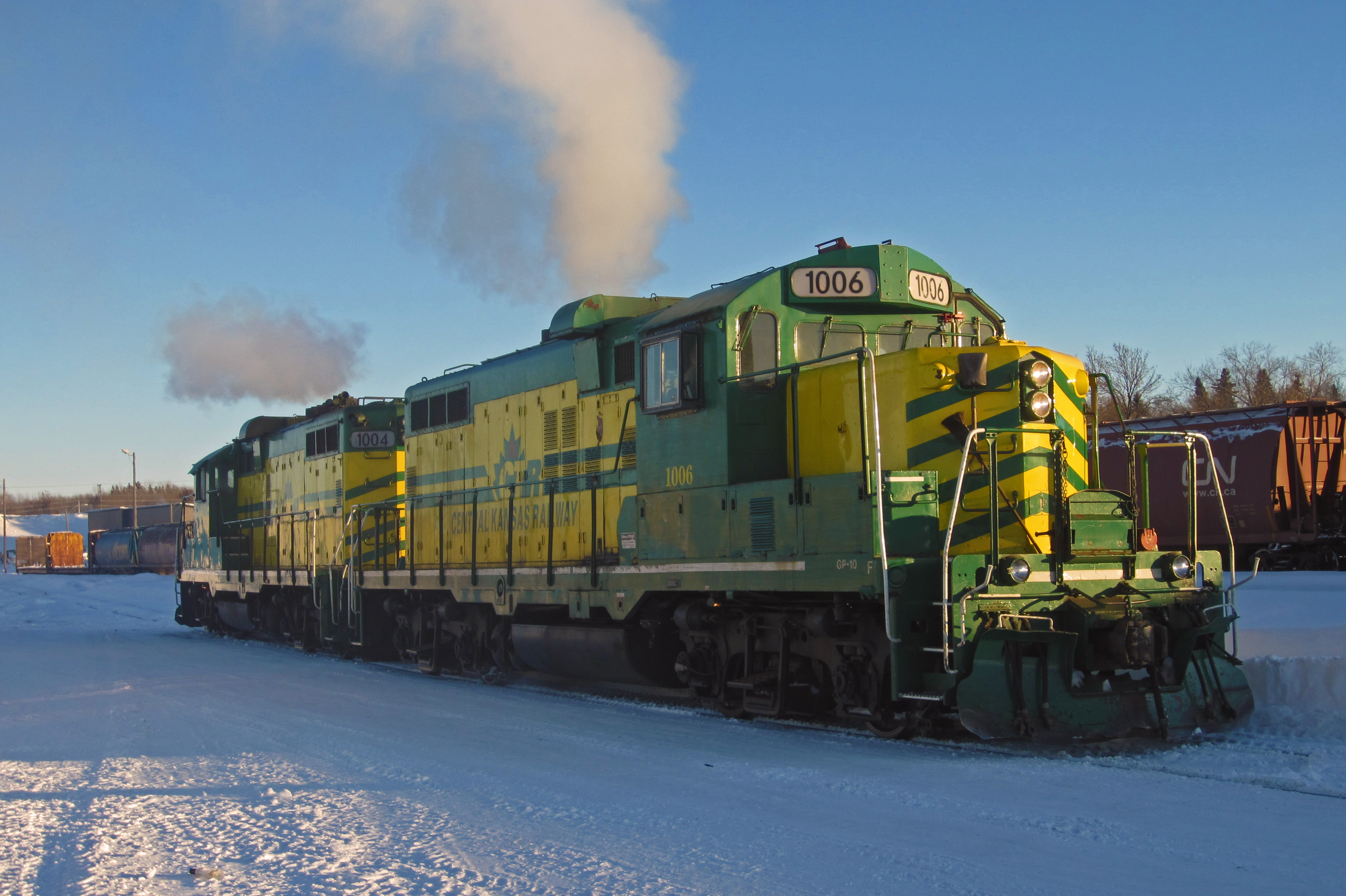
A pair of ex-IC GP10 on Carlton Trail Railway

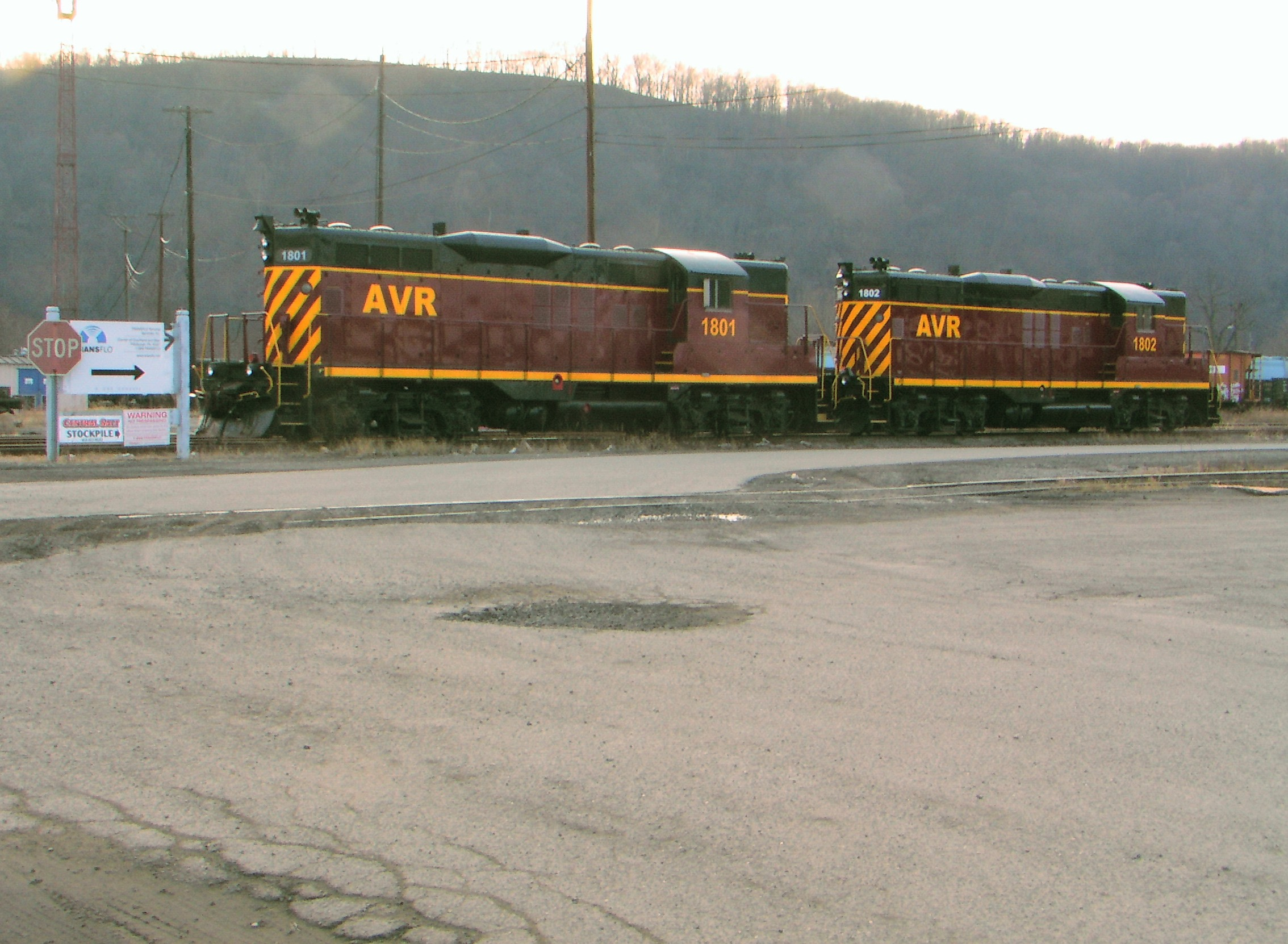
Two ex-Conrail high short hood GP9 on the Allegheny Valley Railroad (1995)

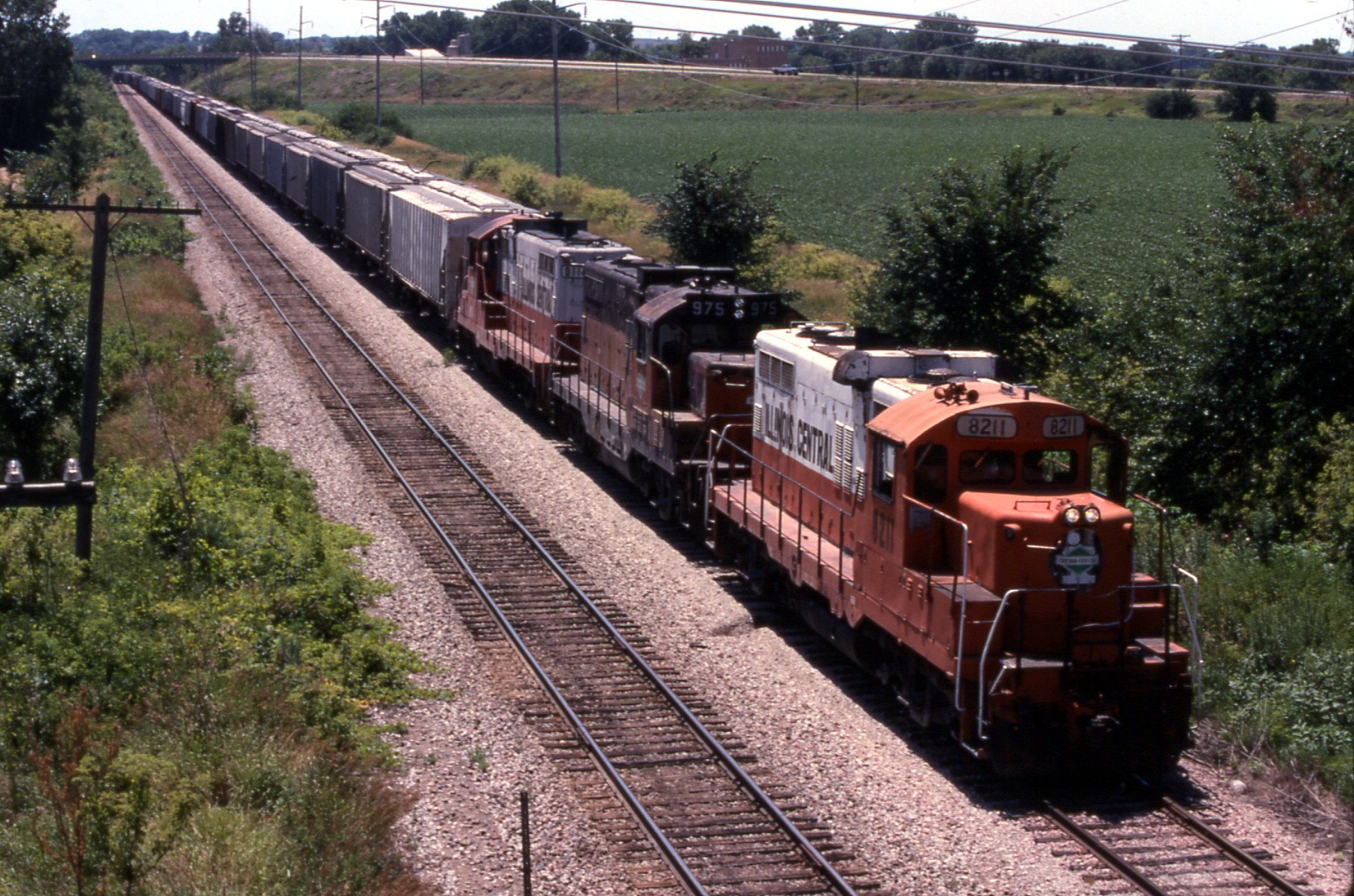
Three ex-IC GP10 (two of them still in the IC livery), sold to the Chicago Central and Pacific Railroad

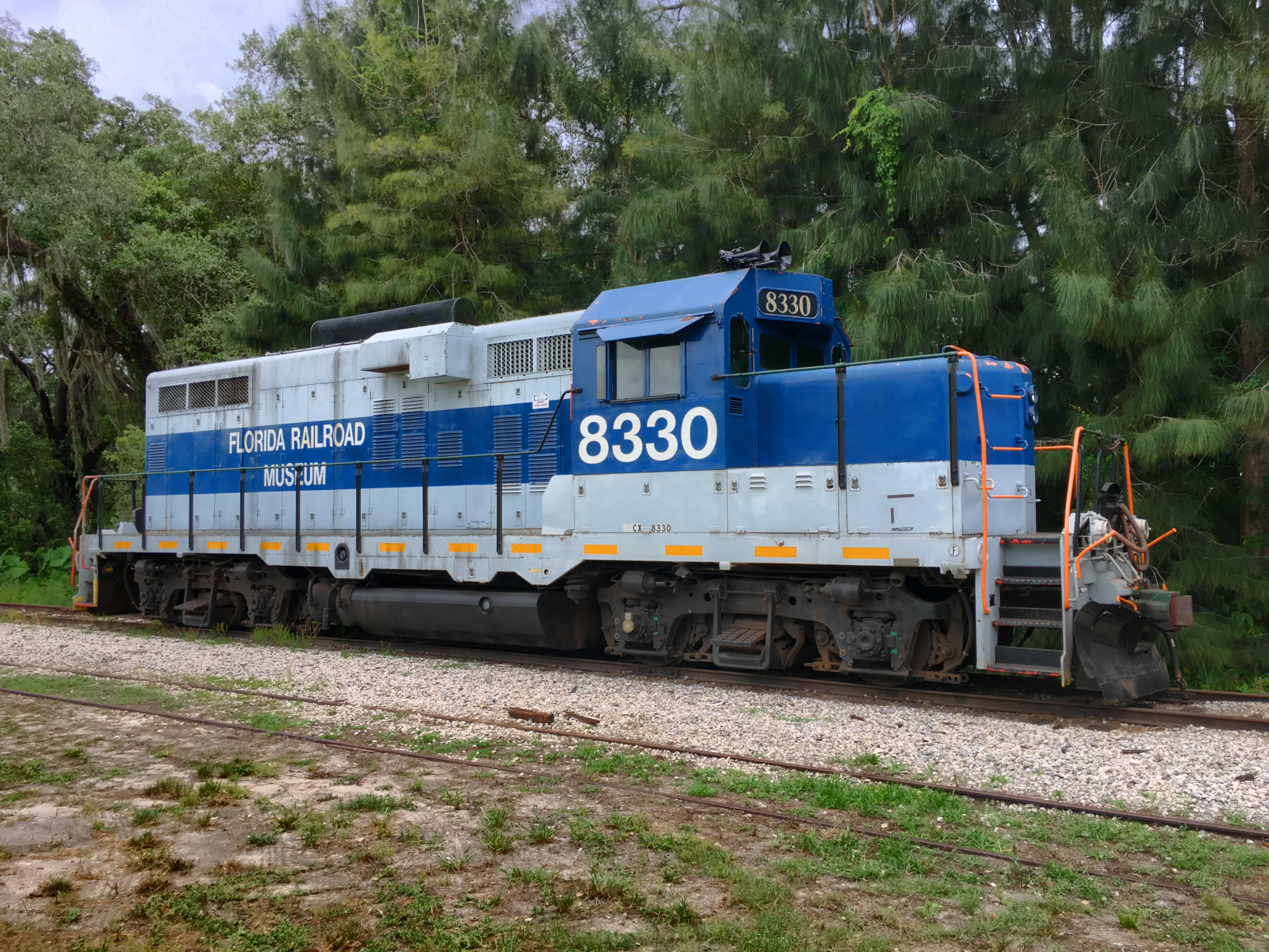
Ex-Illinois Central GP10 #8330 at the Florida Railroad Museum

== See also ==
- List of GM-EMD locomotives
- Data from Extra 2200 South Issue #93 pages 18–36.
- Diesel data from Diesel Era March April 2003.
