= ALCO RSD-15 =

American diesel-electric locomotive

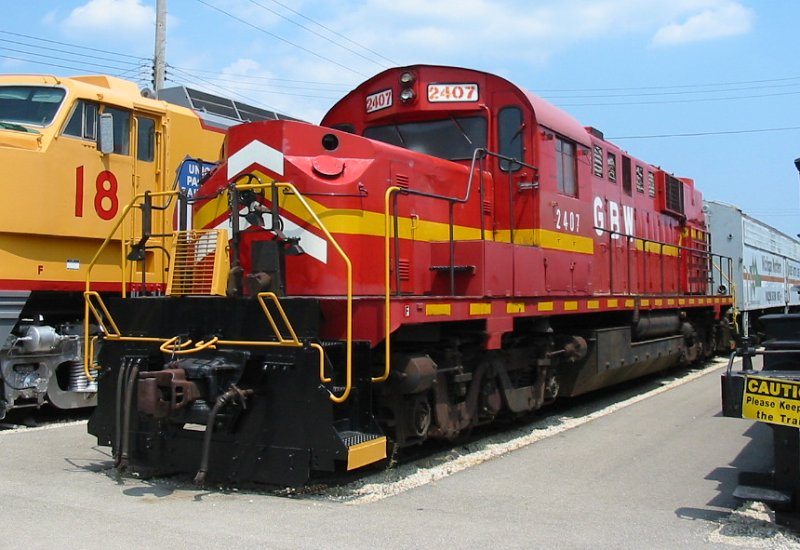
- Green Bay and Western 2407, preserved at the Illinois Railway Museum
Type and origin
- Power type: Diesel-electric
- Builder: ALCO
- Model: DL600B
- Build date: August 1956 – June 1960
- Total produced: 75
Specifications
- Configuration
  - AAR: C-C
  - UIC: Co′Co′
- Gauge: 4 ft 8 1/2 in (1,435 mm) standard gauge
- Trucks: Alco trimount
- Wheel diameter: 40 in (1,016 mm)
- Length: 66 ft 7 in (20.29 m)
- Width: 10 ft 2 in (3.10 m)
- Height: 14 ft 11 in (4.55 m)
- Loco weight: 335,000 lb (151,953.4 kg)
- Fuel capacity: 3,350 US gallons (12,700 L; 2,790 imp gal)
- Prime mover: ALCO 16-251B
- Engine type: V16 Four-stroke diesel
- Generator: GE GT586
- Traction motors: GE 752 (6x)
- Cylinders: 16
Performance figures
- Maximum speed: 65 mph (105 km/h)
- Power output: 2,400 hp (1.79 MW)
- Tractive effort: Starting: 95,600 lbf (425.2 kN) at 25% adhesion; Continuous: 79,500 lbf (353.6 kN) at 12 mph (19 km/h)

The ALCO RSD-15 is a diesel-electric locomotive built by the American Locomotive Company (ALCO) of Schenectady, New York between August 1956 and June 1960, during which time 75 locomotives were produced. The RSD-15 was powered by an ALCO 251 16-cylinder four-cycle V-type prime mover rated at 2,400 horsepower (1.79 MW); it superseded the almost identical ALCO 244-engined RSD-7, and was catalogued alongside the similar but smaller 1,800 hp (1.34 MW) RSD-12, powered by a 12-cylinder 251-model V-type diesel engine.

The locomotive rode on a pair of three-axle Trimount trucks with all axles powered by General Electric model 752 traction motors. These trucks have an asymmetrical axle spacing because of the positioning of the traction motors. The six-motor design allowed higher tractive effort at lower speeds than an otherwise similar four-motor design.

The RSD-15 could be ordered with either a high or low short hood; railfans dubbed the low short hood version "Alligators", due to their unusually long low noses.

== RSD-17 ==
A single example of the very similar model RSD-17 was built by the Montreal Locomotive Works in 1957. After demonstrating on the Canadian Pacific (as #7007), the Canadian National (as #3899), and the Pacific Great Eastern (as #624), the locomotive was purchased by the Canadian Pacific (as #8921). Nicknamed "The Empress of Agincourt", by Pete Fairfull, who was its primary operator for many years, (for its common presence around Toronto's Agincourt yard), the locomotive served the railway until 1995, when truck problems forced its retirement.

== Original owners ==
Image	Railroad	Quantity	Road numbers	Notes
	Atchison, Topeka and Santa Fe Railway	50	800–849	Low nose
	Duluth, Missabe and Iron Range Railroad	6	50–55	Later Bessemer and Lake Erie Railroad 881-886 Cartier acquired the six units (91-96) 6/1972. All 6 units were converted to low hoods. #96 in service as Susquehanna and Maryland RR (SMD) #96
	Pennsylvania Railroad	6	8611–8616	Later Penn Central 6811–6816. Conrail rebuilt four of them to MT6s 1125–1128. After the dividing of Conrail, 2 went to CSX as 1017 and 1018, and 2 went to Norfolk Southern as 1114 and 1115.
	Southern Pacific Railroad	3	250–252	Low nose
	St. Louis Southwestern Railway	10	850-859	Renumbered 5150 – 5159 in 1965 Low nose
	Canadian Pacific Railway	1	8921	RSD-17

== Surviving examples ==
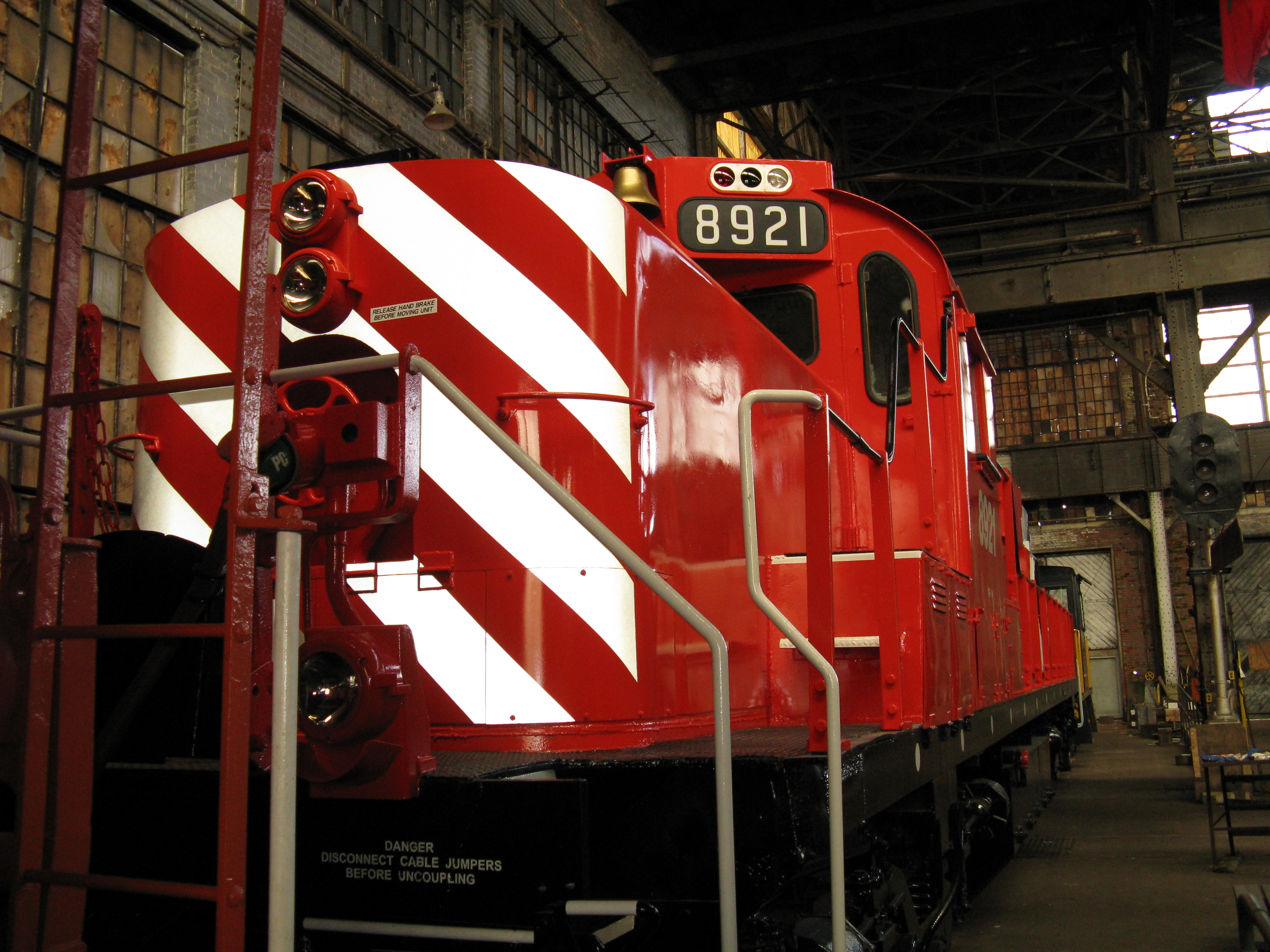
RSD-17 locomotive in Elgin County Railway Museum, St. Thomas, Ontario.

Five RSD-15s survive in preservation; all are ex-Santa Fe units.

- Santa Fe #843 is preserved at the Arkansas Railroad Museum in Pine Bluff, Arkansas.
- Santa Fe #9820 is preserved at the California State Railroad Museum in Sacramento, but is not publicly displayed.
- Austin and Texas Central #442 (ex-ATSF #842) is preserved at the Austin Steam Train Association (ASTA) in Cedar Park, Texas. It's painted in a modified Southern Pacific "Black Widow" scheme. As of 2024, it is out of service undergoing repairs
- Green Bay and Western #2407 (ex-ATSF #841) is preserved and operational at the Illinois Railway Museum.
- Utah Railway #401 (ex-ATSF #823) is preserved at the Utah State Railroad Museum in Ogden, Utah.
- The RSD-17 demonstrator, Canadian Pacific #8921, is preserved at the Elgin County Railway Museum, St. Thomas, Ontario, Canada.

== Models ==
The RSD-15 has been produced in N scale by Mehano of Yugoslavia and Broadway Limited of the United States.

The RSD-15 has been produced in HO scale by Broadway Limited Imports and handmade brass. Alco Models (DL600b) high and Low hoods. Also (Overland Models).

The RSD-15 has been produced in O scale by Atlas O in their Trainman line.

The RSD-17 has not been mass-produced in any scale; however, in 2008 Broadway Limited Imports did produce a limited run of the high-hood CP 8921 in HO scale.

== See also ==
- List of Alco diesel locomotives
- List of MLW diesel locomotives
