= ALCO RS-3 =

Model of diesel-electric locomotive

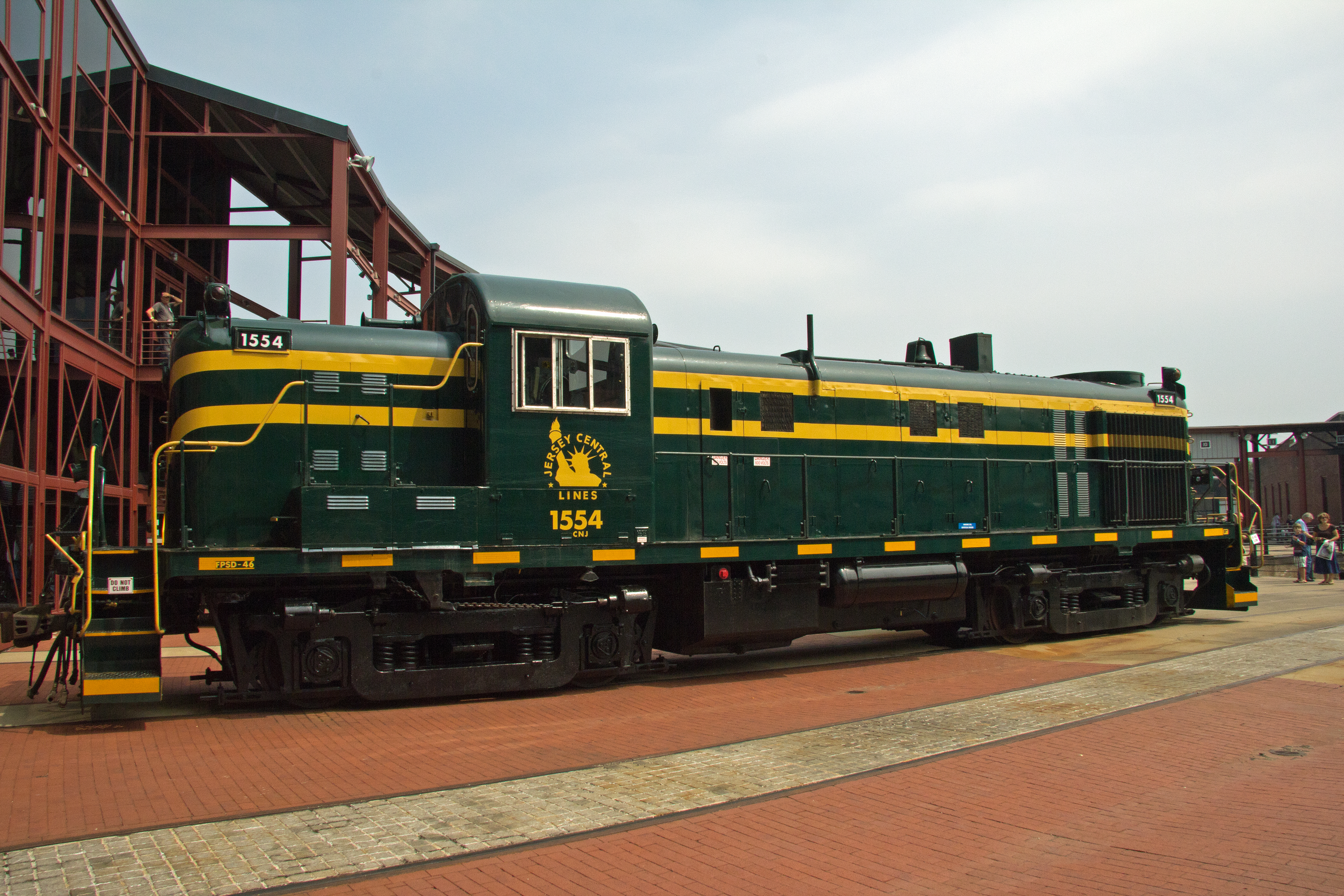
- A former Central Railroad of New Jersey ALCO RS-3 at Steamtown National Historic Site
Type and origin
- Power type: Diesel-electric
- Builder: American Locomotive Company; Montreal Locomotive Works
- Model: RS-3
- Build date: May 1950 – August 1956
- Total produced: 1,418
Specifications
- Configuration
  - AAR: B-B
- Gauge: 4 ft 8 1/2 in (1,435 mm); 5 ft 3 in (1,600 mm) for Brazil
- Trucks: AAR type B
- Wheel diameter: 40 in (1,016 mm)
- Minimum curve: 21°
- Wheelbase: 39 ft 4 in (11.99 m)
- Length: 56 ft 6 in (17.22 m)
- Width: 10 ft 1 5/8 in (3.09 m)
- Height: 14 ft 5 1/8 in (4.40 m)
- Loco weight: 247,100 lb (112,100 kg)
- Prime mover: ALCO 244
- Engine type: V12 Four stroke diesel
- Aspiration: Turbocharger
- Generator: GE GT-581
- Traction motors: (4) GE 752
- Cylinders: 12
- Cylinder size: 9 in × 10 1/2 in (229 mm × 267 mm)
Performance figures
- Maximum speed: 65–85 mph (105–137 km/h)
- Power output: 1,600 hp (1.2 MW)
- Tractive effort: 61,775 lb (28,021 kg)
Career
- Locale: North America; Spain (purchased from US railroads); Brazil (MLW);

The ALCO RS-3 is a 1,600 hp (1.2 MW), B-B diesel-electric locomotive manufactured from May 1950 to August 1956 by American Locomotive Company (ALCO) and its subsidiary Montreal Locomotive Works (MLW). A total of 1,418 were produced: 1,272 for American railroads, 98 for Canadian railroads, 48 for Brazilian railroads, and 7 for Mexican railroads.

The RS-3 greatly resembled the earlier RS-2 and somewhat resembles the RS-1, but it had 100 more horsepower thanks to its 12-cylinder, 1,600 hp ALCO Model 244 engine. It also had some changes to the fuel system and body shape.

Much like the RS-1, many RS-3s served for decades; some are still in use as of 2022.

== Variants ==
RSC-3: an RS-3 that used 3-axle trucks instead of 2-axle trucks. The middle axle on each truck was unpowered. This variant was designed for service on light track, as the extra axles better spread the weight of the locomotive. The RSD-4 and RSD-5 were similar units but with all 6 axles powered.

RS-3m: an RS-3 whose engine was replaced with the more reliable EMD engine. Various railroads had repowering programs, most using 567B (and later 567C) engines from retired E-units in their RS-3's. The New York Central RR rebuilds were nicknamed "DeWitt Geeps", after the shop that did the conversions.

Various Alco production variations occurred depending on the specifications by the customer. A small handful were built with steam generators in an extended-height short hood, nicknamed "Hammerhead" RS3's. Some had dynamic brakes located in the short hood. Some NYC units had one of their air tanks mounted on top of the long hood. Carbody vents, doors, and louvres also changed over the production span.

== Competition ==
ALCO built the RS-3 to compete with EMD, Fairbanks-Morse, and Baldwin Locomotive Works—and in particular with EMD's GP7, introduced in 1949.

The arrival of the 1,500-hp GP7 led ALCO, Fairbanks-Morse, and Baldwin to increased the power of an existing locomotive line from 1,500 to 1,600 hp (1.1 to 1.2 MW) and add more improvements to create new locomotive lines. In 1950, Fairbanks-Morse introduced the 1,600 hp (1.2 MW) H-16-44, while Baldwin introduced the 1,600 hp (1.2 MW) Baldwin AS-16. ALCO's 1,500 hp (1.1 MW) line was the RS-2, although 31 were built in 1950 with 1,600 hp (1.2 MW). Fairbanks-Morse's 1,500 hp (1.1 MW) line was the H-15-44. Baldwin's 1,500 hp (1.1 MW) line was the Baldwin DRS-4-4-1500. EMD kept its GP7 at 1,500 hp (1.1 MW) until 1954, when it introduced the GP9, rated at 1,750 hp (1.30 MW).

In the end, EMD won the road switcher production race. EMD produced 2,729 GP7s. ALCO produced 377 RS-2s, and 1,418 RS-3s. Fairbanks-Morse produced 30 H-15-44s, and 296 H-16-44s. Baldwin produced 32 DRS-4-4-15s, and 127 AS-16s.

== Exports ==
=== Brazil ===
In 1952, the Brazilian railway the Estrada de Ferro Central do Brasil purchased forty six new RS-3s from the Montreal Locomotive Works. Some are still active as work train engines for CPTM, Supervia, and CBTU – BH respectively São Paulo's, Rio de Janeiro's and Belo Horizonte's commuter railways. In Brazil these units were nicknamed Canadians or Hot Tails.

=== Spain ===
In 1964, the Spanish railway the Ferrocarril de Langreo purchased four RS-3s from the Terminal Railroad Association of St. Louis. A fifth unit, number 1604, was purchased in 1971 from the Burlington Northern Railroad (BN), a piece of surplus Great Northern Railway stock from the 1970 merger that formed BN. The locomotives served until 1984, when the line was converted to 1,000 mm (3 ft 3 3/8 in) metre gauge.

== Preservation ==
- Boston & Maine #1508 is owned by the Railroad Museum of New England in Thomaston, Connecticut. It is currently stored awaiting restoration.
- Central of Georgia #109 is owned by the Tennessee Valley Railroad Museum in Chattanooga, Tennessee. It is undergoing restoration.
- Central Railroad of New Jersey #1554 is preserved at Steamtown in Scranton, Pennsylvania. It also sees revenue service on the Delaware Lackawanna shortline railroad.
- Connecticut DOT RS3m #605 is preserved at the Danbury Railway Museum in Danbury, Connecticut.
- Delaware & Hudson #4085 is owned by the Saratoga, Corinth, & Hudson Railway and is under restoration.
- Delaware & Hudson #4103, 4118 operate on the Saratoga, Corinth, & Hudson Railway

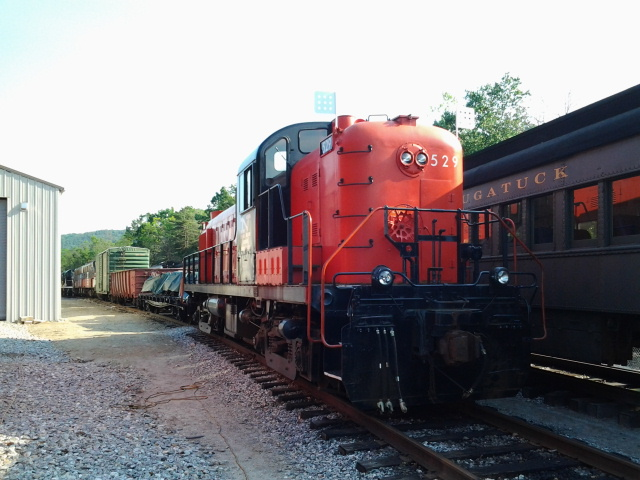
Alco RS-3 at the Railroad Museum of New England

- Great Northern #229 is preserved at the Museum of Innovation and Science in Schenectady, New York.
- Green Bay & Western RS3m #308 is preserved at the Monticello Railway Museum in Monticello, Illinois.
- Kennecott Copper #2 is preserved at the Western Pacific Railroad Museum in Portola, California.
- Lehigh Valley RS3m #211 is preserved at the Rochester & Genesee Valley Railroad Museum in Monroe County, New York.
- Long Island Railroad #1556 is preserved at the Railroad Museum of Long Island in Riverhead, New York.
- Magma Arizona #3 is owned by the Grand Canyon Railway in Williams, Arizona. It is in storage.
- Maine Central #557 is preserved at the Railroad Museum of New England in Thomaston, Connecticut.
- Minnesota Transfer Railway #200 is preserved at the Illinois Railway Museum in Union, Illinois.
- Missouri-Kansas-Texas RS3m #142 is owned by the Midland Railway in Baldwin City, Kansas and used to power excursion trains.
- Missouri Pacific #4502 is preserved at the National Museum of Transportation in Kirkwood, Missouri.
- Nevada Northern #109 is preserved on the Nevada Northern Railway in Ely, Nevada
- New Haven #529 is preserved at the Railroad Museum of New England in Thomaston, Connecticut. It is currently stored awaiting restoration.
- New York Central #8255 is owned by the Adirondack Railway Preservation Society and is under restoration as of 2025.
- New York Central Railroad #8223 was run by Adirondack Scenic railroad; now stored at Union Station Utica NY in the midst of a legal dispute.
- Norfolk & Western #300 is preserved at the Virginia Museum of Transportation in Roanoke, Virginia.
- Ohio Central #1077 is preserved at the Age of Steam Roundhouse Museum in Sugarcreek, Ohio.
- Reading #467 is preserved at Steamtown in Scranton, Pennsylvania.
- Reading #485 is preserved at the Reading Company Museum in Hamburg, Pennsylvania. It is awaiting restoration.
- Western Maryland #195 is preserved at the National Museum of Railroad History & Innovation in Baltimore, Maryland.

== See also ==
- List of ALCO diesel locomotives
- List of MLW diesel locomotives
