= ALCO RS-2 =

Model of US/Canadian diesel-electric locomotive

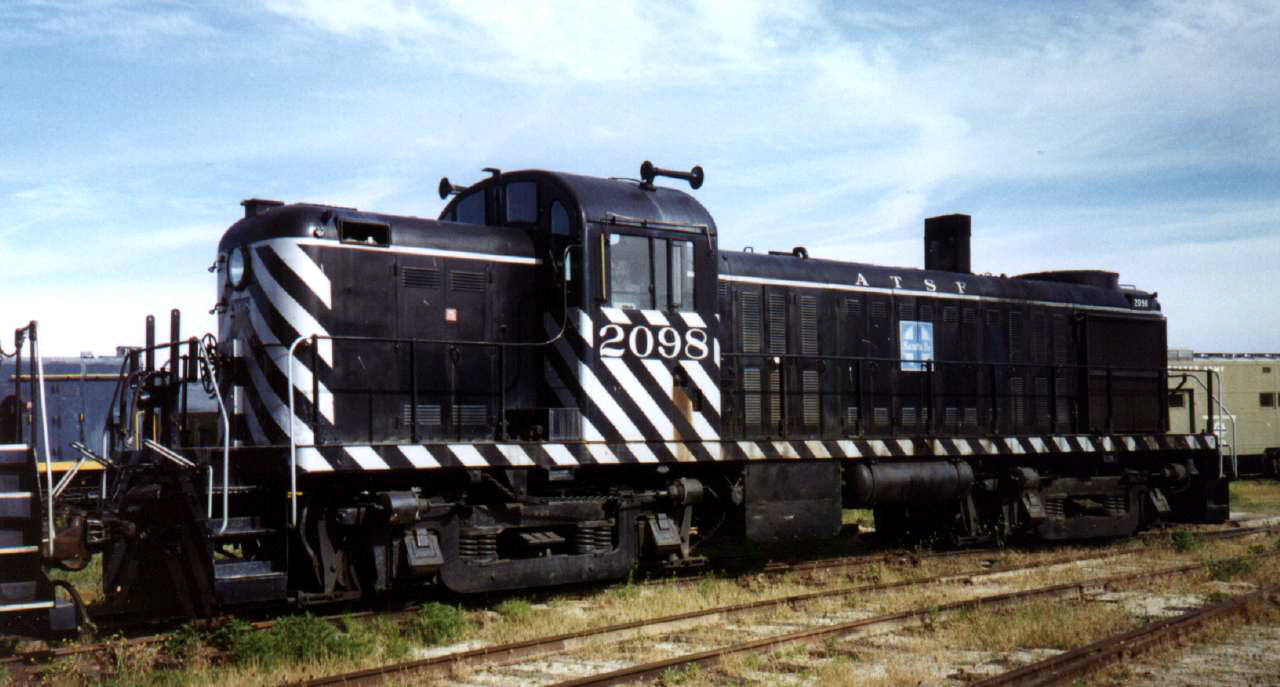
- Santa Fe Railway #2098
Type and origin
- Power type: Diesel-electric
- Builder: American Locomotive Company; Montreal Locomotive Works
- Model: RS-2
- Build date: October 1946 – May 1950
- Total produced: 377
Specifications
- Configuration
  - AAR: B-B
- Gauge: 4 ft 8 1/2 in (1,435 mm) standard gauge
- Trucks: AAR type B
- Wheel diameter: 40 in (1,000 mm)
- Minimum curve: 57° (104.79 ft or 31.94 m)
- Wheelbase: 39 ft 4 in (11.99 m)
- Length: 56 ft (17 m)
- Width: 10 ft (3.0 m)
- Height: 14 ft 5 in (4.39 m)
- Loco weight: 249,600 lb (113,200 kg)
- Fuel capacity: 800 US gal (3,000 L; 670 imp gal)
- Prime mover: ALCO 244
- Engine type: V12 Four-stroke diesel
- Aspiration: Turbocharger
- Generator: GE 5GT-564B-1
- Traction motors: (4) GE 752-A
- Cylinders: 12
- Cylinder size: 9 in × 10 1/2 in (229 mm × 267 mm) bore x stroke
Performance figures
- Power output: 1,500 hp (1.119 MW) @ 1,000rpm later models 1,600 hp (1.193 MW)
- Tractive effort: 62,500 lb (28,300 kg)
Career
- Locale: North America

The ALCO RS-2 is a 1,500–1,600 horsepower (1,100–1,200 kW) B-B diesel-electric locomotive built by the American Locomotive Company (ALCO) from 1946 to 1950. ALCO introduced the model after World War II as an improvement on the ALCO RS-1. Between 1946 and 1950, 377 examples of the RS-2 were built, primarily for American and Canadian customers.

ALCO discontinued the RS-2 in 1950 in favor of the very similar RS-3, which was more popular. Several examples have been preserved.

== Design and development ==
The RS-2 was a further development of the road switcher concept inaugurated with the RS-1. Externally, the RS-2 bodywork was more rounded. A more significant change was the switch from the RS-1's ALCO 539T engine to the ALCO 244, adding horsepower to better handle heavy road service. The new engine was a turbocharged four-stroke V12 diesel engine with a 9 in × 10 1/2 in (229 mm × 267 mm) bore and stroke developing 1,500 (later 1,600) hp at 1,000 rpm. Compared to the 539, it had a smaller cylinder and higher cylinder speed. Production of the RS-2 was delayed several months while ALCO worked out the new four-pipe divided low-rise manifold for the GE constant-pressure RD-1 turbocharger. The 244 engine was not a reliable design, however, and was replaced in less than ten years by the ALCO 251 engine.

== History ==
A total of 377 RS-2s were produced: 368 by the American Locomotive Company and nine by ALCO subsidiary Montreal Locomotive Works in Canada. Eight of the ALCO RS-2s were exported to Canada.

The RS-2 has a single, 12-cylinder, model 244B engine, developing 1,500 horsepower (1,100 kW).

Thirty-one locomotives built by Alco between February and May 1950 were powered by a 12-cylinder 244C 1,600 horsepower (1,200 kW) engine.

ALCO built the RS-2 to compete with EMD, Fairbanks-Morse, and Baldwin Locomotive Works. In 1947, Fairbanks-Morse introduced the 1,500 hp (1.1 MW) H-15-44. Also in that year, Baldwin introduced the 1,500 hp (1.1 MW) DRS-4-4-1500. In the case of ALCO, Fairbanks-Morse, and Baldwin, each company increased the power of an existing locomotive line from 1,500 to 1,600 hp (1.1 to 1.2 MW), and added more improvements to create new locomotive lines.

EMD, however, kept its competing GP7 at 1,500 hp (1.1 MW). In 1954, EMD introduced the GP9. It was rated at 1,750 hp (1.30 MW).

EMD produced 2,734 GP-7s. ALCO/MLW produced 377 RS-2s, and 1,418 RS-3s. Fairbanks-Morse produced 30 H-15-44s, and 296 H-16-44s. Baldwin produced 32 DRS-4-4-1500s, and 127 AS-16s.

The Delaware and Hudson Railway rebuilt 13 of its RS-2s for passenger service, including on the Laurentian. The D&H added a steam generator and 1,600-US-gallon (6,100 L; 1,300 imp gal) water tank.

== Original owners ==
ALCO and Montreal Locomotive Works in Canada built 377 locomotives. Cited and mirrored roster

Image	Railroad	Quantity	Road numbers	Notes
Manufactured by ALCO
	American Locomotive Company (demonstrators)	4	1500, 1500:2, 1501, 1600 (Note: ALCO had two demonstrators numbered 1500.)	
	Alton and Southern Railway	15	28–42	
	Atlantic and Danville Railway	6	101–106	
	Belt Railway of Chicago	9	450–458	
	Birmingham Southern Railroad	1	150	
	Boston and Maine Railroad	9	1501–1504, 1530–1534	
	Canadian Pacific Railway	5	8400–8404	
	Carolina & North-Western Railway	4	1–4	
	Chesapeake and Ohio Railway	2	5500–5501	
	Chicago and North Western Railway	1	1503	
	Chicago Great Western Railway	8	50–57	
	Chicago, Indianapolis and Louisville Railroad	7	21–27	
	Chicago, Rock Island and Pacific Railroad	5	450–454	
	Danville and Western Railway	2	1–2	
	Delaware and Hudson Railway	26	4000–4025	
	Detroit and Mackinac Railway	6	466–469, 4610, 481	
	Elgin, Joliet and Eastern Railway	10	800–809	
	Erie Railroad	19	900–913, 1000–1004	
	Great Northern Railway	20	200–219	
	Green Bay and Western Railroad	4	301–304	
	Gulf, Mobile and Ohio Railroad	14	1501–1514	
	Kennecott Copper Corporation	9	100–102, 104–107, 902–903	
	Lake Superior and Ishpeming Railroad	3	1501–1503	
	Lehigh and New England Railroad	13	651–663	
	Lehigh Valley Railroad	5	210–214	
	Macon, Dublin and Savannah Railroad	3	1700–1702	
	Maine Central Railroad	5	551–555	
	Missouri-Illinois Railroad	1	61	
	New York, New Haven and Hartford Railroad	17	0500–0516	
	New York Central Railroad	23	8200–8222	
	Oliver Iron Mining Company	8	1100–1107	
	Ontario Northland Railway	2	1300–1301	
	Roberval and Saguenay Railway	1	19	
	St. Louis and Belleville Electric Railway	1	70	
	St. Louis-San Francisco Railway	5	550–554	
	Seaboard Air Line Railroad	29	1600–1628	
	Southern Railway	30	2101–2130	
	Spokane, Portland and Seattle Railway	3	60–62	
	Texas and Pacific	1	23	
	Texas Pacific-Missouri Pacific Terminal Railroad of New Orleans	2	21–22	
	Toledo, Peoria and Western Railway	7	200–206	
	Union Pacific Railroad	5	1191–1195	
	Union Railroad	12	601–612	
	Western Maryland Railway	5	180–184	
	Youngstown and Northern Railroad	1	231	
	Total	368		
Manufactured by Montreal Locomotive Works
	Canadian Pacific Railway	4	8405–8408	
	Napierville Junction Railway	2	4050–4051	
	Ontario Northland Railway	2	1302–1303	
	Roberval and Saguenay Railway	1	20	
	Total	9		

== Survivors ==
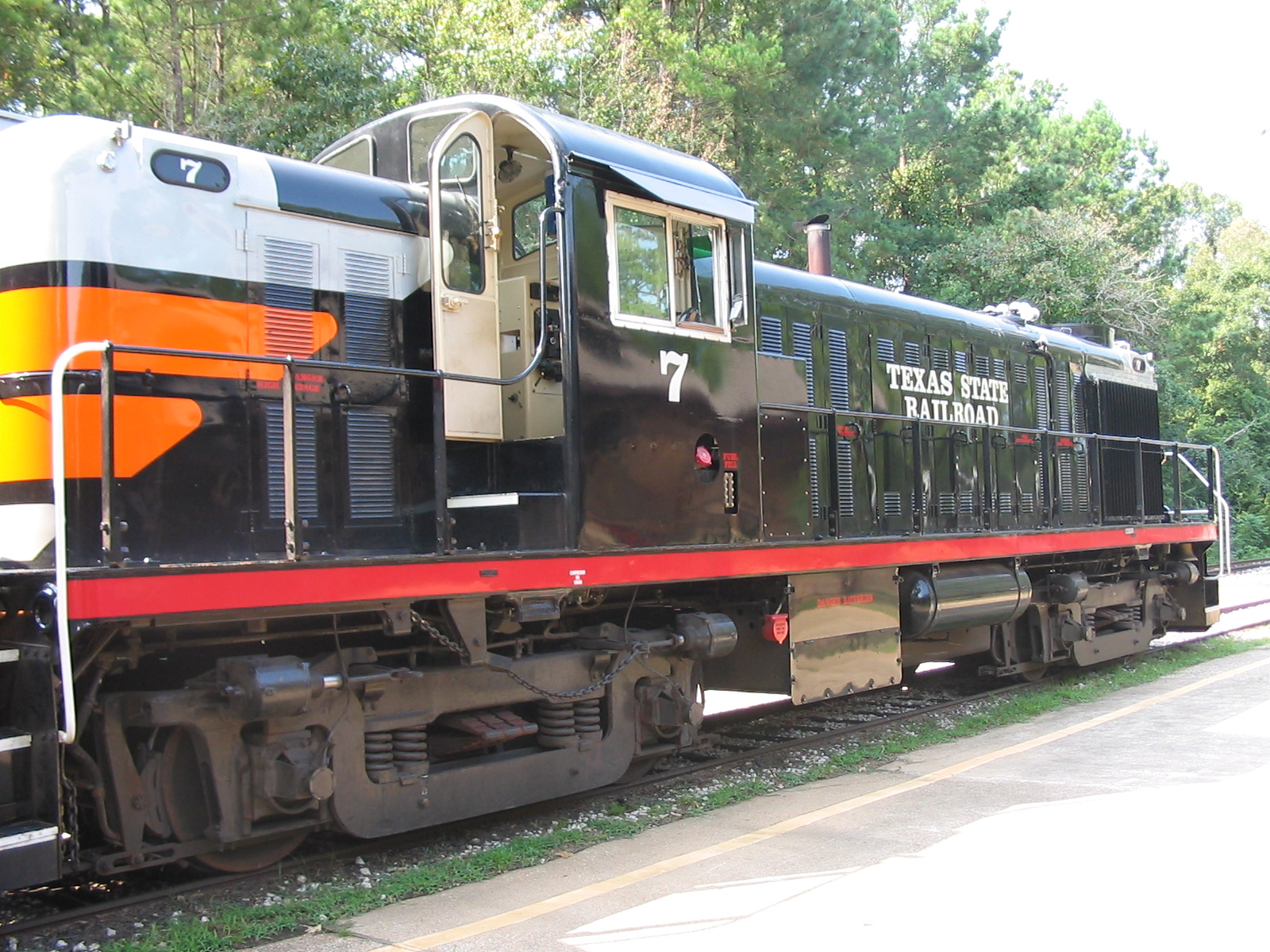
Texas State Railroad's ALCO RS-2

Very few RS-2s survive today. Three former Kennecott Copper locomotives are preserved, including Kennecott Copper 908 (former number 104) at the Western Pacific Railroad Museum at Portola, California. KCC 908 once served the mines out of Ely, Nevada along the Nevada Northern Railway. Nevada Northern 105 is at Ely, Nevada, it was formerly the Kennecott Copper 105. Kennecott Copper 103 is at the San Diego Railroad Museum in Campo, California. It is painted as Santa Fe 2098. Another RS-2 is in active service on the Texas State Railroad (rebuilt as an RS-2-CAT). It is the former Union Railroad 608. The first production RS-2, originally sold to the Detroit & Mackinac RR as their number 466, was fully operable in freight service on the Michigan Southern Railroad (1989) until a few years ago. As of September 2005, the 466 was stored out of service near the Michigan Southern's office in White Pigeon, Michigan, it was finally scrapped in December 2011. The former Detroit & Mackinac 469 was sold to Waymore Power and may be restored. The former Elgin Joliet and Eastern 801 is preserved in Jala, Mexico as a Las Encinas SA de CV 801. And MLW built Roberval and Saguenay 20 is at the Canadian Railway Museum.

== See also ==
- List of ALCO diesel locomotives
- List of MLW diesel locomotives
- Baldwin DRS-4-4-1500 - contemporary design by Baldwin
- EMD GP7 - contemporary design by EMD
- FM H-15-44 - contemporary design by Fairbanks-Morse
