= ALCO RSD-4 =

Diesel-electric locomotive

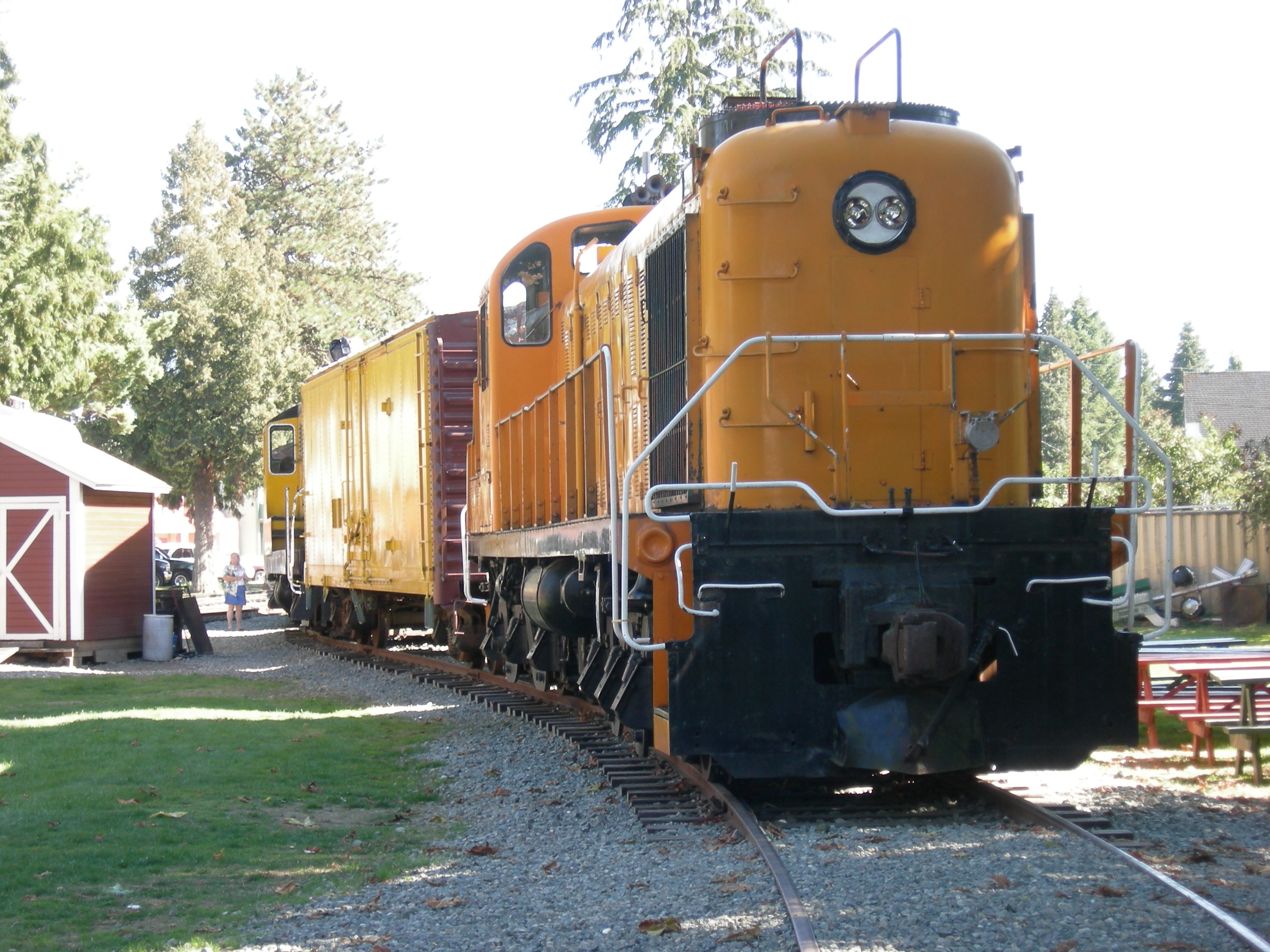
- Kennecott Copper Corporation locomotive 201 on display at Snoqualmie Depot, Snoqualmie, Washington
Type and origin
- Power type: Diesel-electric
- Builder: ALCO
- Model: RSD-4 (Specification E1663)
- Build date: 1951–1952
- Total produced: 36
Specifications
- Configuration
  - AAR: C-C
- Gauge: 4 ft 8 1/2 in (1,435 mm) standard gauge
- Trucks: ALCO trimount
- Wheel diameter: 40 in (1,000 mm)
- Minimum curve: 21° (274.37 ft or 83.63 m)
- Wheelbase: 42 ft 3 in (12.88 m)
- Length: 56 ft 6 in (17.22 m)
- Width: 10 ft 1 7/8 in (3.096 m)
- Height: 14 ft 5 1/4 in (4.401 m)
- Loco weight: 278,860 lb (126,490 kg)
- Fuel capacity: 800 US gal (3,000 L)
- Prime mover: ALCO 244
- RPM range: 1000 (max)
- Engine type: V12 Four-stroke engine diesel
- Aspiration: Turbocharger
- Displacement: 8,016 cu in (131.36 L)
- Generator: GE 5GT-581A1
- Traction motors: (6) GE 5GE752-C1
- Cylinders: 12
- Cylinder size: 9 in × 10.5 in (229 mm × 267 mm)
Performance figures
- Power output: 1,600 hp (1.2 MW)
- Tractive effort: 69,700 lb (31,600 kg)
Career
- Disposition: 1 preserved, remainder scrapped

The ALCO RSD-4 was a 1,600 horsepower (1.2 MW) six axle diesel-electric locomotive built by the American Locomotive Company between 1951 and 1952. It was a derivative of the four-axle ALCO RS-3, with two additional powered axles which allowed better tractive effort at lower speeds. Due to the inadequate capacity of the main generator, this model was later superseded in production by the ALCO RSD-5.

== Original owners ==
Image	Railroad	Quantity	Road numbers	Notes
	Atchison, Topeka and Santa Fe Railway	10	2100–2109	
	Chicago and North Western Railway	5	1515–1517, 1619–1620| |	
	Central Railroad of New Jersey	14	1601–1614	
	Kennecott Copper Corporation	1	201	Preserved
	Utah Railway	6	300–305	
	Total	36		

== Preserved units ==
The only ALCO RSD-4 that has survived is Kennecott Copper Corporation #201. It resided at the Northwest Railway Museum until November 2021 (formerly known as the Puget Sound & Snoqualmie Valley Railway) in Snoqualmie, Washington in its orange Kennecott paint scheme. As of 2021, it has been returned to Ely, Nevada to the Nevada Northern Railway Museum.
