= St. Louis Southwestern Railway (Cotton Belt Route) Caboose No. 2325 =

American historic railway caboose

St. Louis Southwestern Railway (Cotton Belt Route) Caboose #2325
- Manufacturer: St. Louis Southwestern Railway
- Constructed: 1920
- St. Louis Southwestern Railway (Cotton Belt Route) Caboose #2325
- U.S. National Register of Historic Places
- Location within Arkansas Location within the United States
- Location: 2815 Dixie Woods Blvd., Pine Bluff, Arkansas
- Coordinates: 34°16′4″N 92°3′34″W
- Built: 1920
- NRHP reference No.: 06000074
- Added to NRHP: May 19, 2006

The St. Louis Southwestern Railway (Cotton Belt Route) Caboose #2325 is a historic railroad caboose. It was built in 1920 by the St. Louis Southwestern Railway (aka the Cotton Belt) at its Pine Bluff, Arkansas shop, and is one of only a few surviving 2300-series cabooses. It was used by the railroad on its Paragould-Blytheville route and was acquired by the Paperton Junction Southern Railway in 1980 and restored.

The caboose was listed on the National Register of Historic Places in 2006. At that time, it was located at the Paperton Junction Southern Railway rail yard in Pine Bluff. As of May 2024, the caboose has been moved from the Paperton Junction Southern Railway to the Arkansas Railroad Museum and is currently stored on the first shop track directly across from the main visitor's entrance.

== See also ==
- National Register of Historic Places listings in Jefferson County, Arkansas
