= ALCO RSD-5 =

Diesel-electric locomotive

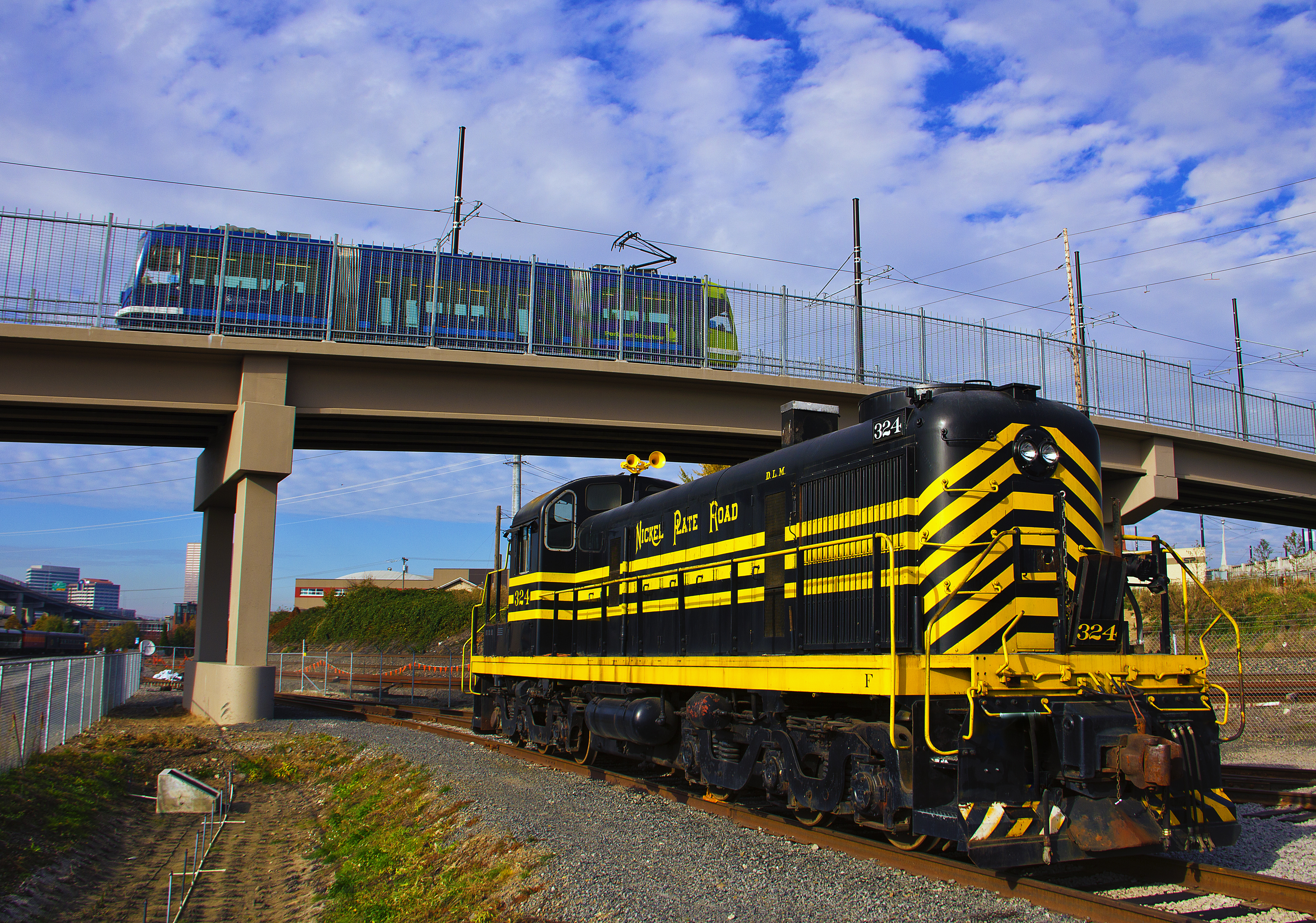
- Preserved Nickel Plate No. 324 (originally Utah Railway No. 306) at the Oregon Rail Heritage Center in 2013
Type and origin
- Power type: Diesel-electric
- Builder: ALCO
- Model: RSD-5
- Build date: 1952–1956
- Total produced: 204 (167 USA, 37 Mexico)
Specifications
- Configuration
  - AAR: C-C
- Gauge: 4 ft 8 1/2 in (1,435 mm) standard gauge
- Trucks: ALCO trimount
- Wheel diameter: 40 in (1,016 mm)
- Minimum curve: 21° (274.37 ft or 83.63 m
- Wheelbase: 42 ft 3 in (12.88 m)
- Length: 56 ft 6 in (17.22 m)
- Width: 10 ft 1 5/8 in (3.089 m)
- Height: 14 ft 8 1/4 in (4.477 m)
- Loco weight: 287,000 lb (130,000 kg)
- Fuel capacity: 1,300 US gal (4,900 L; 1,100 imp gal)
- Prime mover: ALCO 244
- RPM range: 1000 (max)
- Engine type: V12 Four-stroke engine diesel
- Aspiration: Turbocharger
- Displacement: 8,016 cu in (131.36 L)
- Generator: GE GT566
- Traction motors: (6) GE 752
- Cylinders: 12
- Cylinder size: 9 in × 10.5 in (229 mm × 267 mm)
Performance figures
- Maximum speed: 65 mph (105 km/h)
- Power output: 1,600 hp (1.2 MW)
- Tractive effort: 71,750 lb (32,550 kg)

The ALCO RSD-5 is a diesel-electric locomotive rated at 1,600 horsepower (1.2 MW), that rode on a pair of three-axle trucks, having a C-C wheel arrangement.

Basically an upgraded version of the earlier ALCO RSD-4, and used in much the same manner as its four-axle counterpart, the ALCO RS-3, the six-motor design allowed better tractive effort at lower speeds.

== Original owners ==
Image	Railroad	Quantity	Road numbers	Notes
	American Locomotive Company (demonstrator)	1	1606	to ATSF 2157
	Atchison, Topeka and Santa Fe Railway	52	2110–2156, 2158–2162	
	Birmingham Southern Railroad	1	160	
	Chesapeake and Ohio Railway	26	5570–5595	
	Chicago and North Western Railway	10	1665–1667, 1684–1690	
	Central Railroad of New Jersey	1	1615	
	Chicago, Milwaukee, St. Paul and Pacific Railroad (Milwaukee Road)	6	2150–2155	Renumbered 570–575
	Pennsylvania Railroad	6	8446–8451	
	St. Louis Southwestern Railway	3	270–272	
	Southern Pacific Company	36	5294–5307, 5336–5339, 5445–5448, 5494–5507	21 of them traded back to Alco in 1960 and rebuilt into Alco RSD-12's
	Southern Pacific (Texas and New Orleans Railroad)	24	155–176, 185–186	
	Utah Railway	1	306	to DLMX 324
	Ferrocarril del Pacífico	35	801–835	
	Ferrocarriles Nacionales de México	2	6900–6901	
	Total	204		

== Preserved units ==
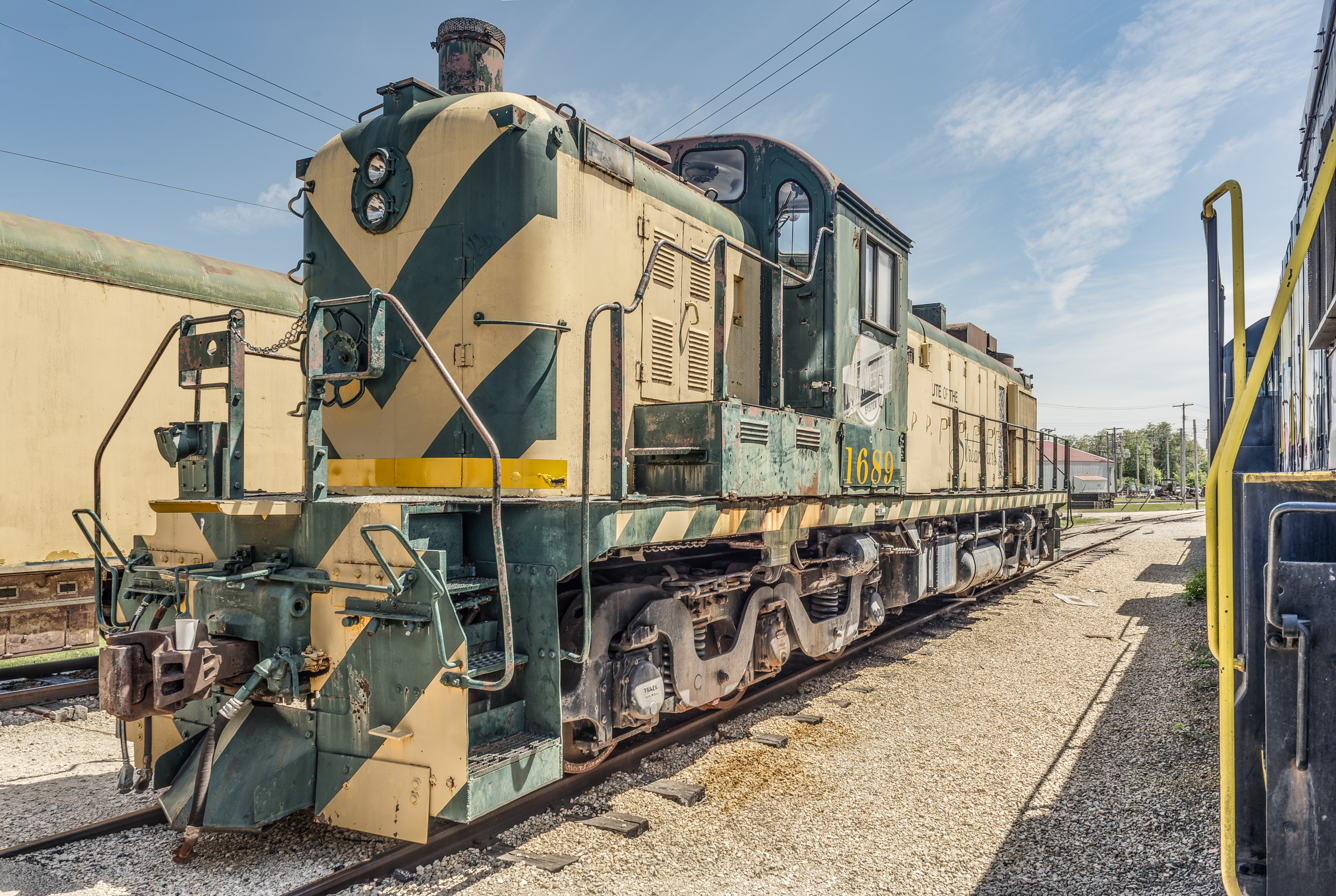
A three-quarter view of Illinois Railway Museum's unrestored Alco 1954 Chicago & North Western 1689 Diesel-Electric RSD-5

As of 2024, there are only two unrebuilt RSD-5s known to be in existence.

- CNW #1689 is preserved and operational at the Illinois Railway Museum.
- Utah Railway #306 is preserved at the Utah State Railroad Museum awaiting a planned restoration to its Utah Railway colors. It is currently painted as Nickel Plate Road #324, from its former owner, Doyle McCormack of the Oregon Rail Heritage Foundation.

Two former RSD-5s (rebuilt as RSD-12's) built for the Southern Pacific survive at the Southern California Railway Museum (SP #2954 and SP #2958).
