= Class 40 =

Class 40 or 40 class may refer to:

- British Rail Class 40
- Electroputere LE5100, otherwise known as CFR Class 40/41/42
- New South Wales 40 class locomotive
- Class40, a class of monohull sailboat and a yacht primarily used for short handed offshore and coastal racing
