= FM H-16-44 =

Model of American diesel locomotives

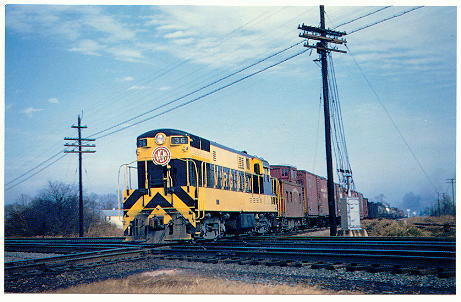
- Virginian Railway #36 in South Norfolk, Virginia.
Type and origin
- Power type: Diesel-electric
- Builder: Fairbanks-Morse
- Model: H-16-44
- Build date: April 1950 – February 1963
- Total produced: 299
Specifications
- Configuration
  - AAR: B-B
  - UIC: B′B′
- Gauge: 4 ft 8 1/2 in (1,435 mm)
- Length: 51 ft 0 in (15.54 m)
- Loco weight: 250,000 lb (113.4 tonnes)
- Prime mover: FM 38D-8 1/8
- Engine type: Two-stroke diesel
- Aspiration: Roots blower
- Displacement: 8,295 cu in (135,930 cm^{3})
- Cylinders: 8 (Opposed piston)
- Cylinder size: 8.125 in × 10 in (206 mm × 254 mm)
- Transmission: DC generator, DC traction motors
- Loco brake: Straight air
- Train brakes: Air
Performance figures
- Maximum speed: 65 mph (105 km/h)
- Power output: 1,600 hp (1.19 MW)
- Tractive effort: 42,125 lbf (187.4 kN)
Career
- Locale: North America

The FM H-16-44 was a diesel-electric locomotive produced by Fairbanks-Morse from April 1950 – February 1963. The locomotive shared an identical platform and carbody with the predecessor Model FM H-15-44 (but not the FM H-20-44 end cab road switcher which used a different carbody and frame and a larger prime mover), and were equipped with the same eight-cylinder opposed piston engine that had been uprated to 1,600 horsepower (1,200 kW). The H-16-44 was configured in a B-B wheel arrangement, mounted atop a pair of two-axle AAR Type-B road trucks with all axles powered. In late 1950, the AAR trucks were almost exclusively replaced with the same units found on the company's "C-liner" locomotives.

As with many of their F–M contemporaries, the H-16-44s produced through 1954 featured numerous Raymond Loewy design touches, in this case largely manifested in the form of sloping body lines and a noticeable protrusion in the long hood around the radiator shutters. Cab side window units include inoperable "half moon"-shaped panes, resulting in an oblong-shaped assembly. To reduce manufacturing costs, the curved window panes were eliminated from later models, and from 1953 onward the raised, elongated headlight mounting was omitted. Units built in the "Spartanized" fashion can be spotted by their straight ends, coupled with the lack of superfluous trim. Ventilation slots were added at the battery box to reduce the possibility of explosions. The final production phase, which commenced in March 1955, turned out units that most closely resembled the Fairbanks–Morse "Train Master" series.

209 were built for American railroads, 58 were manufactured from March 1955 – June 1957 by the Canadian Locomotive Company for use in Canada, and 32 units were exported to Mexico.

== Units produced by Fairbanks-Morse (1950–1963) ==
Image	Railroad	Quantity	Road numbers
	Akron, Canton and Youngstown Railroad	8	201–208
	Alabama Great Southern Railroad	6	6545–6550
	Atchison, Topeka and Santa Fe Railway	20	2800–2819
	Baltimore and Ohio Railroad	10	906, 907, 925–927, 6705–6709
	Bosques de Chihuahua	2	501, 1000
	Central Railroad of New Jersey	4	1514–1517
	Chicago, Milwaukee, St. Paul and Pacific Railroad	37	2450–2516
	Chihuahua al Pacífico	30	501–525, 600–605
	Delaware, Lackawanna and Western Railroad	6	930–935
	Long Island Rail Road	8	1501–1509
	Missouri-Kansas-Texas Railroad	5	1591, 1731–1734, all re-engined by Baldwin-Lima-Hamilton in 1960 with I8 608A
	New York Central Railroad	13	7000–7012 to Penn Central 5100-5112
	New York, New Haven and Hartford Railroad	25	560–569, 1600–1614, 1600s to Penn Central 5160-5174
	Pennsylvania Railroad	10	8807–8816 to Penn Central 5150-5159
	Pittsburgh and West Virginia Railroad	4	90–93
	Southern Railway	10	2146–2155
	Union Pacific	3	DS1340–DS1342
	Virginian Railway	40	10–49

== Units produced by the Canadian Locomotive Company (1955–1957) ==
Image	Railroad	Quantity	Road numbers
	Canadian National Railway	18	1841–1858
	Canadian Pacific Railway	40	8547–8556, 8601–8610, 8709–8728

== Preservation ==
Two intact examples and one partially intact example of the H-16-44 are known to survive today, all in Mexico.

- Chihuahua al Pacifico #602 is preserved as FNM #602 at the National Rail Museum in Puebla. It was formerly displayed at the Chihuahua al Pacífico shops in Mexico.
- Chihuahua al Pacifico #524 is partially preserved as part of a memorial at Temoris, Chihuahua.
- Chihuahua al Pacifico #525 is preserved in Nuevo Casas Grandes, Chihuahua.

Former Canadian Pacific 8554, which had been set aside for preservation by CP in the 1970's, was scrapped in December 2023.
