= Bosques de Chihuahua =

Logging railroad

Basques de Chihuahua, full name Bosques de Chihuahua Sociedad de Responsabilidad Limitada de Capital Variable was a small logging railroad located in the state of Chihuahua, Mexico. The approximately 32 km line ran from a lumber mill at Mesa Del Huracán in Madera Municipality to a connection with the Ferrocarril Chihuahua al Pacífico. Abandoned in 1988, this railroad rostered three diesel locomotives, an EMD SW1 and two Fairbanks-Morse H-16-44's. The railroad is notable as the last that actively operated the H-16-44 model in revenue service.

== See also ==
- List of Mexican railroads
