= Bob Grubba =

Robert "Bob" Grubba was the director of engineering for Lionel Trains in the late 1990s.

He started Broadway Limited Imports in 2001 with partners Tony Wenzel of Oriental Limited and Bob Zimet of QS Industries, maker of QSI sound systems. Broadway Limited Imports was the first company to offer sound and remote control equipped HO trains, and won the Model Railroader Magazine 2002 and 2003 Product of the Year and HO Model of the Year awards. Mr. Zimet and Mr. Wenzel sold their shares to Mr. Grubba in 2004 and the company was moved to Ormond Beach, Florida.

In 2004, Grubba founded Precision Craft Models, Inc. which was the first company to install sound systems and remote control in the smaller N scale model trains.

Robert Grubba holds the following US patents:

	Patent No.	Title
1	7,307,394	Control and motor arrangement for use in model train
2	7,298,103	Control and motor arrangement for use in model train
3	7,215,092	Radio-linked, bi-directional control system for model electric trains
4	7,211,976	Control and motor arrangement for use in model train
5	6,765,356	Control and motor arrangement for use in model train
6	6,616,506	Inserted molded traction tire for a model toy train
7	6,485,347	Puffing fan driven smoke unit for a model train
8	6,441,570	Controller for a model toy train set
9	6,186,074	Drive assembly for model train
10	5,188,173	Pressure control system and cable guiding device for use in drilling wells
