= Arkansas Railroad Museum =

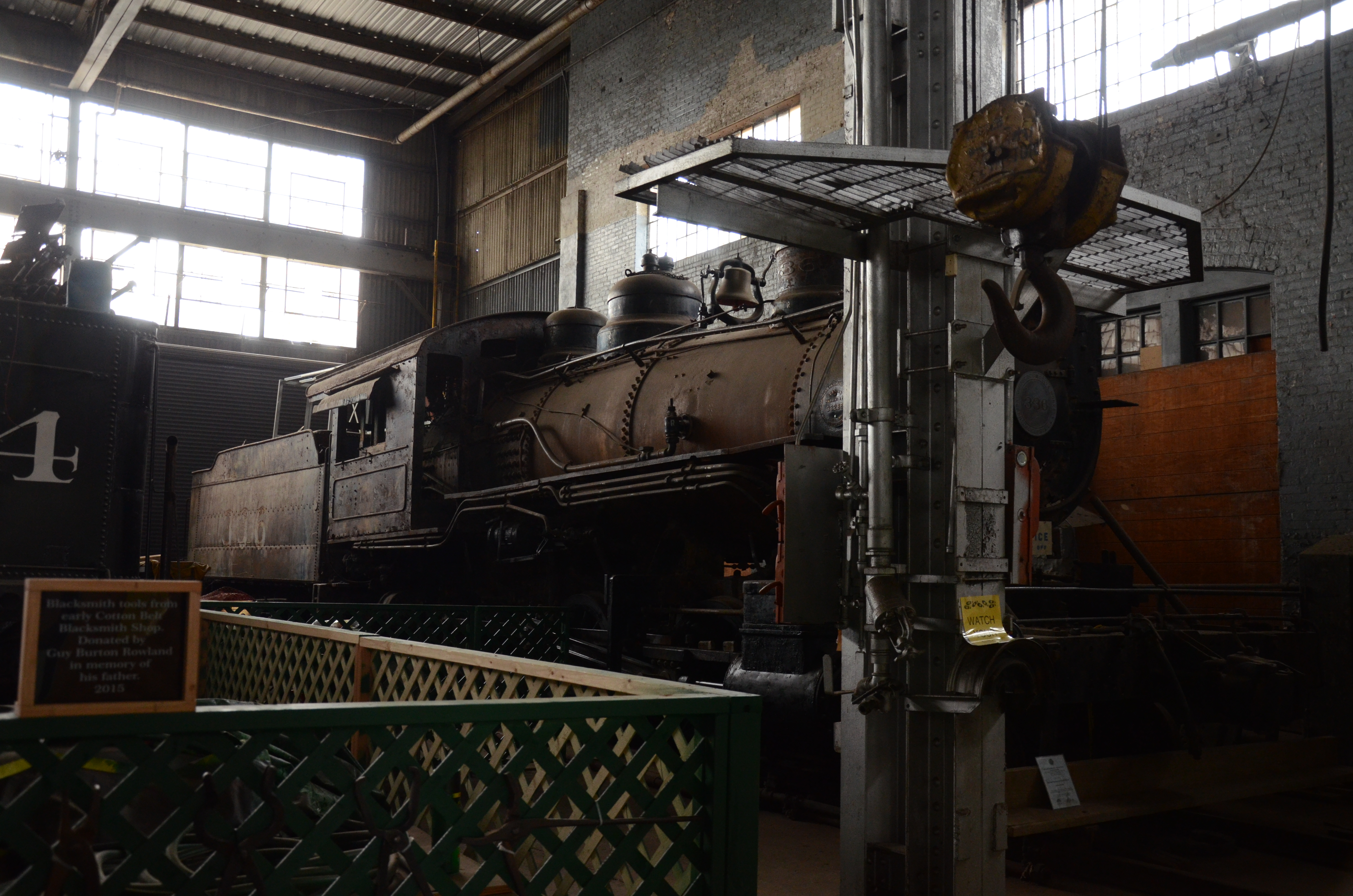
- St. Louis Southwestern Railway (Cotton Belt Route) Steam Locomotive 336
- Location: 1700 Port Road; Pine Bluff, Arkansas
- Type: Railroad museum
- Website: arkansasrailroadmuseum.org

Arkansas Railroad Museum is located on Port Road in Pine Bluff, Arkansas at the former Cotton Belt (SSW) yard.

The former SSW shops are occupied by the historic collection of railroad equipment. This museum is about an hour's drive from Little Rock, AR, and is one of the largest displays of historic railroad equipment in Arkansas. The Museum is operated by the Cotton Belt Rail Historical Society and local volunteers. The Museum is open Thursday through Saturday from 10 AM to 2 PM and other hours can be arranged by appointment.

== Specific equipment ==
- St. Louis Southwestern Railway Steam Locomotive #819
- U.S. National Register of Historic Places
- Location within Arkansas Location within the United States
- Location: 1720 Port Rd., Pine Bluff, Arkansas
- Coordinates: 34°13′37″N 91°59′5″W
- Built: 1943
- Architect: St. Louis Southwestern Railway
- NRHP reference No.: 03000401
- Added to NRHP: May 18, 2003

Arkansas Railroad Museum is most famous for stabling SSW #819, the last steam locomotive built by the Cotton Belt. The 819 was restored to operation in 1986 and operated in excursion service until the early 1990s, but is currently out of service. A collection of historical passenger cars, including lightweight equipment, is also kept for use behind 819. The 819 is listed on the National Register of Historic Places.

The following equipment is at the museum:

- St. Louis Southwestern Railway (Cotton Belt Route) Steam Locomotive #336
- U.S. National Register of Historic Places
- Location: 1700 Port Rd., Pine Bluff, Arkansas
- Built: 1909
- Architect: Baldwin Locomotive Works
- NRHP reference No.: 06001276
- Added to NRHP: January 24, 2007

Cotton Belt 336, a D3 Mogul built by Baldwin in 1909, is in poor condition and will be cosmetically restored. This locomotive is also listed on the National Register.

- St. Louis Southwestern Railway (Cotton Belt Route) Relief Train
- U.S. National Register of Historic Places
- Location: 1700 Port Rd., Pine Bluff, Arkansas
- Built: 1940
- Architect: Industrial Brownhoist
- NRHP reference No.: 07000471
- Added to NRHP: May 25, 2007

The following cars are part of the St. Louis Southwestern Railway (Cotton Belt Route) Relief Train, also listed on the National Register:

- SSW 96005 a 200 Ton Industrial Brownhoist Steam Relief Crane.
- SSWMW 5682 Boom Car
- SSWMW 98501 Generator Flat Car
- SSWMW 94129 Kitchen Car
- SSWMW 96216 Tool Car
- SSWMW 96209 Crew Sleeper

Other equipment at the museum includes:

- Union Pacific 2907 – Alco C-630
- Lake Superior and Ishpeming 2300 – GE U23C
- Cotton Belt 5006 – EMD GP30
- Little Rock and Western #102 (ex L&N #1306) - Alco C420
- KLIX #2003 (ex SSW #815) EMD GP20
- Rescar GE 25-tonner, listed on the National Register (reference number 07000442)
- West Tennessee #2054 (ex-SP 7012) – ALCO RSD-12
- AT&SF 843 – Alco RSD-15
- Wabash Alloys GE 25-tonner, listed on the National Register (reference number 07000444)
- The tender of SSW 814 sister engine to SSW 819
- 1942 Tool Car ex-SP Baggage car St. Louis Car Co.
- 1944 Power Car ex-SP Baggage 6616
- G56 Guard Car ACF hospital car from WW2, listed on the National Register (reference number 07000441)
- SN87 Jordan Snow Plow U S Army, listed on the National Register (reference number 06001273)
- 1947 Apple Blossom ex-GN 1121
- SSW 2214 – Wood Cupola Caboose
- SSW 83 – Bay Window Caboose
- SP 125 – Bay Window Caboose built November 1966
- AM 1410 – 60-ft Mechanical Reefer ex-EL
- 3480 Pegasus Baggage Dorm ex-AT&SF Budd 1938 Transition Car
- CBHS 819336 Tank Car

== Facility ==
The equipment is mostly housed in the former SSW shops, which was the main heavy repair and erection shop for SSW during the steam era. The shop has such heavy repair equipment as pits, massive overhead cranes, and tools for servicing large railroad equipment. On the east side of the former shops is a transfer table that is still operable. The transfer table is used to move exhibits from time to time. The best time to see the exhibits outside is the first weekend in April (unless that weekend is Easter) when the Museum has its annual show. Many of the exhibits are taken outside so that tables can be set up inside the museum for vendors.
