= ALCO RSC-3 =

1600-hp 6-axle diesel-electric locomotive

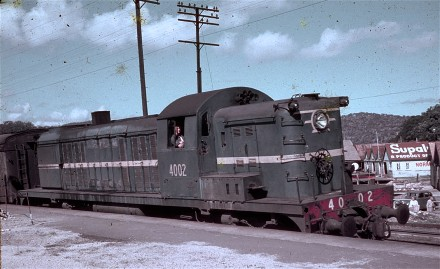
- New South Wales Government Railways 4002
Type and origin
- Power type: Diesel-electric
- Builder: ALCO; MLW
- Model: RSC-3
- Build date: November 1950 – June 1955
- Total produced: 99
Specifications
- Configuration
  - AAR: A1A-A1A
- Gauge: 4 ft 8 1/2 in (1,435 mm) standard gauge and others
- Length: 53 ft 1 in (16.18 m)
- Width: 10 ft (3.05 m)
- Height: 14 ft 5 in (4.39 m)
- Loco weight: 254,840 lb (115,590 kg)
- Fuel capacity: 800 US gal (666 imp gal; 3,028 L)
- Prime mover: ALCO 12-244
- Engine type: V12 Four-stroke diesel
- Aspiration: Turbocharged
- Displacement: 8,016 cu in (131.36 L)
- Generator: DC generator
- Traction motors: DC traction motors
- Cylinders: 12
- Cylinder size: 9 in × 10 1/2 in (229 mm × 267 mm)
- Transmission: Electric
- Loco brake: Straight air
- Train brakes: Air
Performance figures
- Maximum speed: 65 mph (105 km/h)
- Power output: 1,600 hp (1,190 kW)
- Tractive effort: 42,470 lbf (188.92 kN)
Career
- Locale: North America, Central America, South America, Portugal, Australia, Pakistan

The ALCO RSC-3 was a diesel-electric locomotive of the road switcher type rated at 1,600 horsepower (1,200 kW), that rode on three-axle trucks, having an A1A-A1A wheel arrangement.

Used in much the same manner as its four-axle counterpart, the ALCO RS-3, though the axle load was spread out for operation on light rail such as are found on branch lines. This locomotive had much better success as an export unit than in the domestic market.

== Original owners ==
=== Locomotives built by ALCO ===
Railroad	Quantity	Road numbers	Notes
Algerian Railways	5	DG1–DG5	
Ferrocarril Central del Uruguay	3	1601–1603	1,435 mm (4 ft 8 1/2 in) gauge (last one, 1602, withdrawn in 1993)
North Western Railway of Pakistan	26	3301–3326	to Pakistan Railways 1,676 mm (5 ft 6 in) gauge
Panama Railroad	3	901–903	5 ft (1,524 mm) gauge
São Paulo Railway, Brazil	12	550–561	1,600 mm (5 ft 3 in) gauge
Caminhos de Ferro Portugueses	5	1521–1525	1,668 mm (5 ft 5 21/32 in) gauge
Consolidated Railways of Cuba	6	1606-1611	
Seaboard Air Line Railroad	7	1537–1543	to Seaboard Coast Line 1111–1117
Soo Line Railroad	4	372–374, 2380	2380 owned by Wisconsin Central Railway
Total	71		

=== Locomotives built by Montreal Locomotive Works ===
Image	Railroad	Quantity	Road numbers	Notes
	New South Wales Government Railways	20	4001–4020	NSW 40 class
	Pacific Great Eastern Railway	8	561–568	to British Columbia Railway
	Total	28		

== Preserved ==
This list is incomplete. Please help expand it.

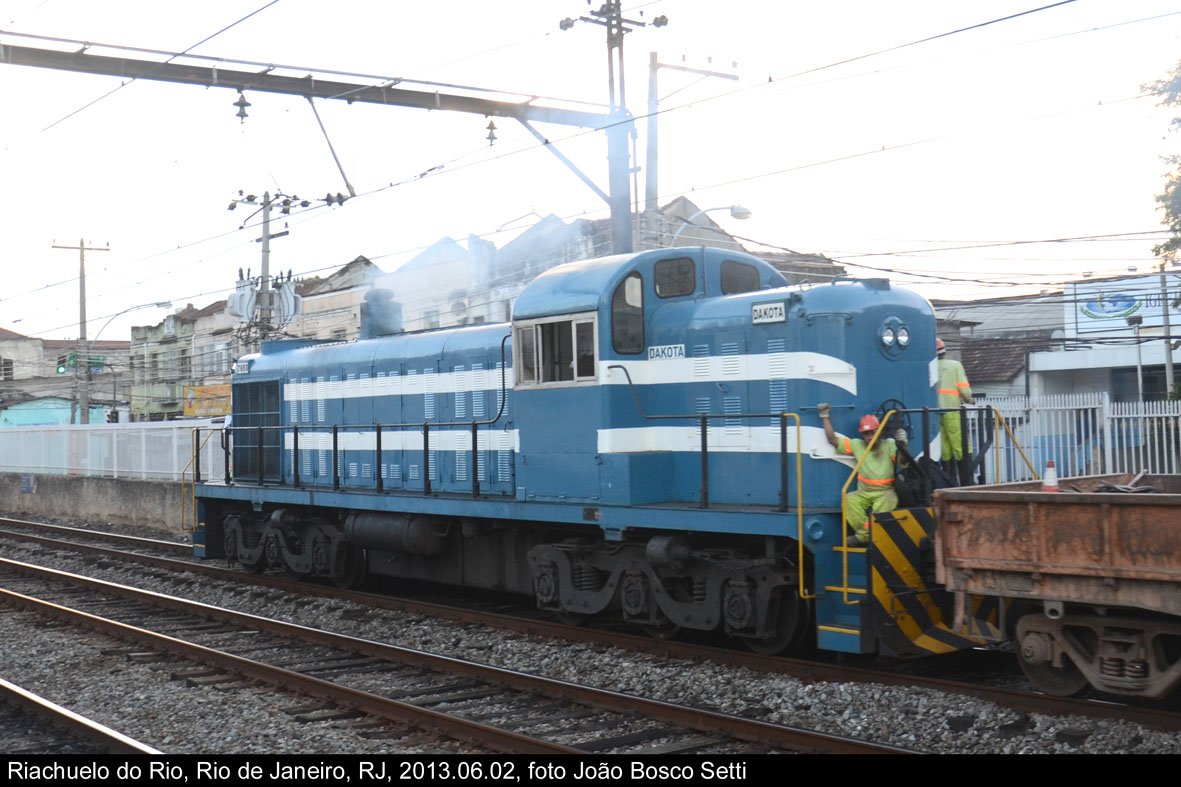
Locomotive ALCO RSC-3 7653, originally manufactured for CPEF, having operated in FEPASA, Ciminas and SPA Engenharia. Currently belongs to IRON and operates in rented Supervia.

Australia

- 4001 Preserved at the NSWRTM Thirlmere
- 4002 Preserved at the PRHS Western Australia
- 4006 On static display Wickham WA

Brazil

- 7653 operating in Supervia

Canada

- PGE 561 operating in Squamish at the Railway Museum of British Columbia

Portugal

- 1525 operating in SOMAFEL

== See also ==
- List of ALCO diesel locomotives
- List of MLW diesel locomotives
