= ALCO RSD-7 =

Diesel-electric locomotive

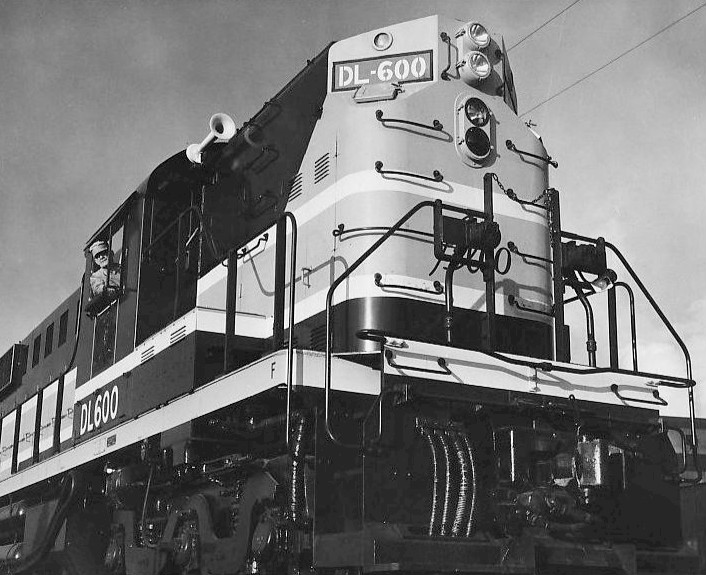
- RSD-7 demonstrator DL-600, the first example built by ALCO.
Type and origin
- Power type: Diesel-electric
- Builder: ALCO
- Model: RSD-7
- Total produced: 29
Specifications
- Configuration
  - AAR: C-C
  - UIC: Co′Co′
- Gauge: 4 ft 8 1/2 in (1,435 mm)
- Prime mover: ALCO 16-244
- Cylinders: V16
Performance figures
- Power output: DL-600: 2,250 hp (1,678 kW; 2,281 PS); DL-600A: 2,400 hp (1,790 kW; 2,433 PS)
Career
- Disposition: All scrapped

The ALCO RSD-7 was a diesel-electric locomotive of the road switcher type built by ALCO at Schenectady, New York between January 1954 and April 1956. Two versions were built, with the same RSD-7 model designation but different specifications and power ratings, although both used the ALCO 244 engine in V16 configuration. Specification DL-600, of which only two were built, developed 2,250 hp (1,678 kW; 2,281 PS) and used the 244G engine. The revised specification DL-600A, numbering 27 locomotives, was rated at 2,400 hp (1,790 kW; 2,433 PS) and used the 244H engine. The RSD-7 was superseded by the ALCO 251-engined ALCO RSD-15, which looks very similar. The RSD-7 was the last ALCO diesel built with a 244 engine.

Both rode on a pair of three-axle trucks with all three axles on each truck powered; this is a C-C wheel arrangement. These trucks have an unequal axle spacing due to traction motor positioning; the outer two axles on each truck are closer together than the inner two. The RSD-7 used the GE 752 traction motor. The six-motor design allowed better tractive effort at lower speeds.

== Demonstrators ==
The two RSD-7 demonstrators were significant for ALCO. They were built with the intention of challenging the Fairbanks-Morse Train Master H-24-66, which entered the market in 1953. When built in early 1954 the RSD-7 delivered the highest continuous tractive effort of all diesel locomotives then available, and could also boast 75% more dynamic braking capacity than any standard freight unit available at the time. The superlatives of the RSD-7 allowed two units to do the work of three conventional 4-motor units.

The dynamic brake system was mounted on top the long hood, leaving room in the short hood for a steam generator. The RSD-7 included a number of firsts for ALCO: it was the first ALCO built with the notched corner sand fills, the first ALCO to use the coiled air brake intercoolers mounted just above and ahead of the radiator intakes, and the first ALCO to use the then new Model 710 water cooled turbocharger in a 16-cylinder engine.

The two demonstrators were numbered DL600 and DL601. The DL600 weighed 360,000 pounds, giving it a weight of 60,000 pounds per axle. The DL601 weighed 390,000 pounds, with 30,000 pounds added to test the gains in adhesion from the extra weight. Additional experimentation by ALCO included new fuel injection pumps and nozzles, increased fuel rack settings, and an aftercooler to reduce engine air inlet temperature. The aftercooler allowed higher density inlet air into the engine, which promoted greater fuel burning efficiency. The aftercooler became the feature that allowed the 244 to be pushed to 2400 horsepower, with a new designation of 244H. The 244H is also known as the Alco 250 engine to disassociate it from the troubled 244 engine series.

The maroon, yellow and gray painted RSD-7 demonstrators began a 23-railroad, 50,000 mile demonstration tour in the Spring of 1954. The tour concluded in September 1954 and the two units were refurbished before sale to the Atchison, Topeka and Santa Fe Railway.

None survived into preservation.
