= Broadway Limited Imports =

Scale model manufacturer

- Company type: LLC
- Founded: 2001
- Founder: Anton Wenzel, Bob Zimet and Bob Grubba
- Headquarters: Ormond Beach, FL
- Key people: Bob Grubba, President/CEO; Ken Silvestri, VP of Sales
- Products: Model railroad locomotives and rolling stock
- Revenue: $10 Million (Est.)
- Number of employees: 12 (US) 350 (Korea)
- Website: Broadway Limited Imports, LLC

Broadway Limited Imports, LLC (BLI) designs and manufactures limited-run HO scale and N scale model railroad locomotives and rolling stock. BLI products, produced in extremely limited quantities, are equipped with Digital Command Control decoders and the ability to reproduce the recorded sounds of actual trains.

The company was founded in 2001 by Anton Wenzel, Bob Zimet and Robert Grubba. In 2004, Grubba bought out the interest of his partners, moving the company to Ormond Beach, Florida the following year. On April 8, 2007, BLI combined their website with Precision Craft Models, Inc.

The company expanded its offering in 2007 with the addition of its "Blueline" product line. The Blueline HO-scale train models offer digital sound systems but lack the DCC remote control and sell for about half the price of the company's Paragon series models. The purchaser can add the remote control later with a plug-in decoder module.

In 2009, the offered product line expanded again. The new Paragon2 line utilizes an integrated DCC decoder that can be operated on DC track as well, as well as DCC sound capability and steam generating units on many locomotives.

In 2015 the company introduced Rolling Thunder, US patent #7,634,411, a system that transmits the low frequency bass sounds from a locomotive to a subwoofer located beneath the model train layout. The bass sounds play in synchronization with the audio as it plays through the on-board speakers housed in the locomotive.
