= ALCO 244 =

Diesel prime mover

The ALCO 244 was a diesel prime mover built by the American Locomotive Company (ALCO). An evolution of the earlier 241 diesel engine, it powered ALCO's first generation of production road locomotives. The 244 engine was developed to create an engine capable of being used in railroad freight and passenger locomotives. The 244 engine was also used in a very limited basis as a marine power plant in ships and as a stationary power generator.

In early 1944, with the 241 engine undergoing testing, design work began on the 244; later that year, ALCO management appropriated the program separate funding, and subsequently chose to commit to bringing the 244 to production as soon as possible, dropping plans to use the 241 in commercial service. Alco management was very disappointed with the progress of the 241 engine tests at Auburn. Alco created a new diesel engine engineering team at Schenectady, New York and began a new diesel engine design. This new diesel engine was called the 244 and it would have the same 9 inch by 10.5 inch bore and stroke as the 241 engine. To avoid the problems caused by the expensive to build 241 engine, the 244 was rushed into production at Auburn, New York without an extensive and lengthy testing process. Alco began negotiations with the government to purchase buildings 144, 145, and 149 at Schenectady, New York. These buildings were built in 1941 for war production. Alco needed these additional facilities to begin diesel engine and diesel locomotive manufacturing at Schenectady.

Initially, major differences between the 241 and 244 included an engine block modified for mass production, redesigned connecting rods, and redesigned main bearings. Based on testing of the 241, General Electric redesigned their turbocharger used on the engine. In August 1945, the first completed engines were released for testing. The first Auburn built 12V-244 engine was shipped to Schenectady on October 22, 1945. The second engine followed on November 13. One of these engines was put on a 600-hour test inside Building 37 at Schenectady. The test started on November 23 and concluded on December 17 with six shutdowns to fix minor problems. Positive test results were reported at an Alco sales meeting conducted December 17th through 20th. Production of the first FA-1s and FB-1 commenced before the testing of the 244 engine was completed.

The first 12-cylinder 244 engines destined for commercial service in the FA freight locomotives were completed in January 1946, followed in June by the first 16-cylinder versions for the PA passenger locomotives. Friday January 4, 1946, was the date the demonstrators were photographed at Alco's Schenectady Assembly Plant. The demonstrators units were released for testing on the D&H Railroad on Wednesday January 9, 1946. In mid-1946, the cast iron crankshafts used in the initial run of engines were replaced with a new forged steel crankshaft.

== Alco's 1946 Diesel Line ==
Six new Alco road diesels were introduced in 1946 built around the 244 engine. These were the FA-1, FB-1, PA-1, PB-1, RS-2 and RSC-2. In late 1945, the 244A went into production with the 12 cylinder at Auburn, New York. The Gulf Mobile and Ohio RR had a standing order with Alco for 80 freight diesels. The 244 engines that were first installed in locomotives for testing were V12 designs of 1500 horsepower for the first FA-1s and FB-1. The January 1946 production of the first three demonstrators and another FA-1 was halted by a steel strike by mid month. Additional FA-1 locomotives were not completed until May 1946. The 16 Cylinder 244 engines installed in the first PA-1 and PB-1 were delayed until late June 1946. The new road switchers, the RS-2 and RSC-2 were delayed several months while the hi-rise manifold was redesigned to allow for a lower long hood.

Due to the speed with which the 244 engine was moved from design to production, engines failed in service with high frequency in 1946 and 1947. For example, the first 20 of the 244 engines installed in GM&O freight units had to be rebuilt with new forged crankshafts. Despite the redesign of crankshafts, the new forged versions continued to fail, particularly in the 12-cylinder engines; this problem was traced to metallurgical flaws in components from a supplier. Flaws in welding main bearing saddles to the engine block resulted in about 600 blocks replaced, while both the saddles and bearings themselves required redesign and replacement. GE air-cooled RD-1 turbocharger assemblies also required repeated redesign of both manifolds and turbines. By early 1948, ALCO had spent $4.3 million on field repairs and modifications of 244 engines. In 1950, the first engines with upgrades new from the factory, dubbed the 244D, were installed in locomotives, beginning with the RS-3. In 1953, the RD-1 and RD-2 turbochargers were replaced with GE water-cooled RD-3 and RD-4 models, followed the next year by ALCO-designed and built 510 and 710 turbos. This corresponded with the refinement of the 244 to versions 244G and 244H. The Alco 244H engine is also known as the Alco 250 engine. This was done by Alco to disassociate the 250 from the troublesome 244 engine. The 250 was produced for a short time from 1955 into 1956. It was also used as a standard to rebuild older 244 engines at Schenectady.

In 1949, in the midst of continued failures of 244 engines, ALCO engineers began work on a clean-sheet diesel engine. After an extended testing period, in 1956 the company introduced a new line of locomotives powered by the new engine, named the 251, marking the end of 244 production.

== Power generation ==
The V-12 designs of 1,600 hp (1,190 kW) version of the 244 engine was used in Alco's high end power generation for a short time.

The 244 engine was still used in higher-end power generation packages until it too was replaced by 251-engined power generation equipment in 1956.

== 244 locomotive uses ==
Engine type	Power (hp)	Locomotive(s)
V-12 244	1400	RSC-24.
V-12 244	1500	FA-1, FB-1, RS-2, RSC-2.
V-12 244C	1600	FA-1, FB-1, FA-2, FB-2, RS-1, RSD-1, RS-2, RSC-2, RS-3, RSC-3, RSD-4, RSD-5, MRS-1, RS-10, RSC-24, ALCO FCA-3, ALCO DL-500A, MLW DL-500.
V-16 244	2000	PA-1, PB-1.
V-16 244G	2250	PA-2, PB-2, RSD-7.
V-16 244H	2400	RSD-7.
