= New South Wales 40 class locomotive =

Class of Australian diesel locomotives

New South Wales 40 class
- Preserved example 4001 at Central in October 2026
Type and origin
- Power type: Diesel-electric
- Builder: Montreal Locomotive Works, Canada
- Serial number: 77732–77751
- Model: ALCO RSC-3
- Build date: 1951/52
- Total produced: 20
Specifications
- Configuration
  - UIC: (A1A)(A1A)
- Gauge: 4 ft 8 1/2 in (1,435 mm) standard gauge
- Wheel diameter: 40 in (1,016 mm)
- Length: Over headstocks`: 52 ft 0 in (15.85 m), Over coupler pulling faces: 56 ft 7 1/4 in (17.25 m)
- Width: 9 ft 11 1/8 in (3.03 m)
- Height: 14 ft 0 5/8 in (4.28 m)
- Axle load: 18 long tons 10 cwt (41,400 lb or 18.8 t)
- Loco weight: 111 long tons 0 cwt (248,600 lb or 112.8 t)
- Fuel type: Diesel
- Fuel capacity: 1,200 imp gal (5,500 L; 1,400 US gal)
- Lubricant cap.: 164 imp gal (750 L; 197 US gal)
- Coolant cap.: 217 imp gal (990 L; 261 US gal)
- Sandbox cap.: 28 cu ft (0.79 m^{3})
- Prime mover: Alco 12-244
- RPM range: 350-1000
- Engine type: V12
- Aspiration: Turbocharged
- Generator: General Electric 5GT 581 PA2
- Traction motors: General Electric 753
- Cylinders: 12
- Cylinder size: 9 in × 10.5 in (229 mm × 267 mm)
Performance figures
- Maximum speed: 75 mph (121 km/h)
- Power output: Gross: 1,750 hp (1,305 kW), For traction: 1,650 hp (1,230 kW)
- Tractive effort: Continuous: 46,000 lbf (204.62 kN) at 11 mph (18 km/h)
Career
- Operators: NSW Department of Railways
- Number in class: 20
- Numbers: 4001-4020
- Nicknames: Submarines
- First run: 30 November 1951
- Retired: December 1971
- Preserved: 4001, 4002, 4006
- Disposition: 3 preserved, 17 scrapped

The 40 class are a class of diesel locomotives built by Montreal Locomotive Works, Canada for the New South Wales Department of Railways in 1951/52.

== History ==
The 40 class were the first mainline diesel electric locomotives to be built for the New South Wales Department of Railways. Built by the Montreal Locomotive Works in 1951/52, they were based on the ALCO RSC-3 design.

There were subtle deviations from the standard RSC-3 built by the American Locomotive Company. These included cab sides that angled inwards from just below the cab window-sill level upwards to reduce the width of the locomotive at the eaves of the cab roof, and placement of the handrails on the car body rather than the standard walkway arrangement.

They were originally used on heavy freight services from Sydney to Broadmeadow and later on North Coast services to Brisbane and Main South line services to Albury. All were delivered in grey undercoat and painted in verdant green at Eveleigh Carriage Workshops. For the 1954 Royal Tour of Queen Elizabeth II 4001 and 4002 were repainted blue. In the 1960s all were repainted Indian red.

With major electrical work required and their lack of power compared to other diesels, the 40 class were withdrawn from May 1968 with the last being taken out of service in December 1971. Some had parts recycled in to the new build 442 class locomotives.

== Preservation ==
The NSW Rail Museum preserved 4001. It was returned to traffic in October 2010 painted in the blue livery it received in 1954 to haul the Royal Train. Robe River Iron Associates purchased 4002 and 4006 for use on construction trains and later as shunters in the Pilbara region of Western Australia where they were renumbered 9405 and 9401. These were withdrawn in 1979 with 4002 donated to the Pilbara Railways Historical Society and returned to working order while 4006 was donated to the Wickham Lions Club and placed on a plinth at the tourist information bay.

== Modeling ==
The 40 class was produced in HO scale as two different runs of brass models by David Anderson. They are produced as ready to run by Eureka Models. It was released in late 2017. A representation of the 40 class has previous been made by modifying an Atlas RSD-4/5 model both in HO and later in O scale, primarily by replacing the cab and making several detail changes, though retaining the incorrect unequal axle spacing of the Co type bogie instead of the correct A1A type.

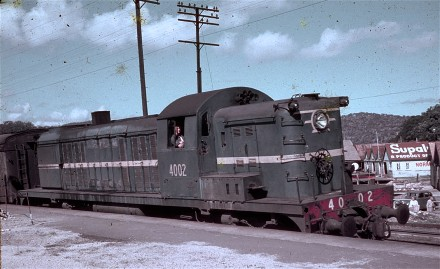
Blue 4002 heading south through Hawkesbury River station

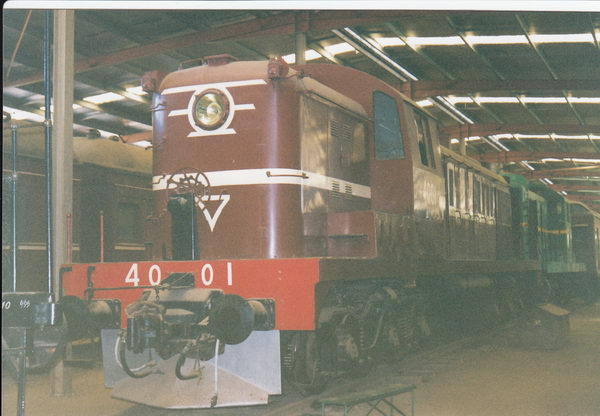
4001 at the New South Wales Rail Transport Museum in 2001 before being restored
