= ALCO RSD-12 =

C-C diesel-electric locomotive

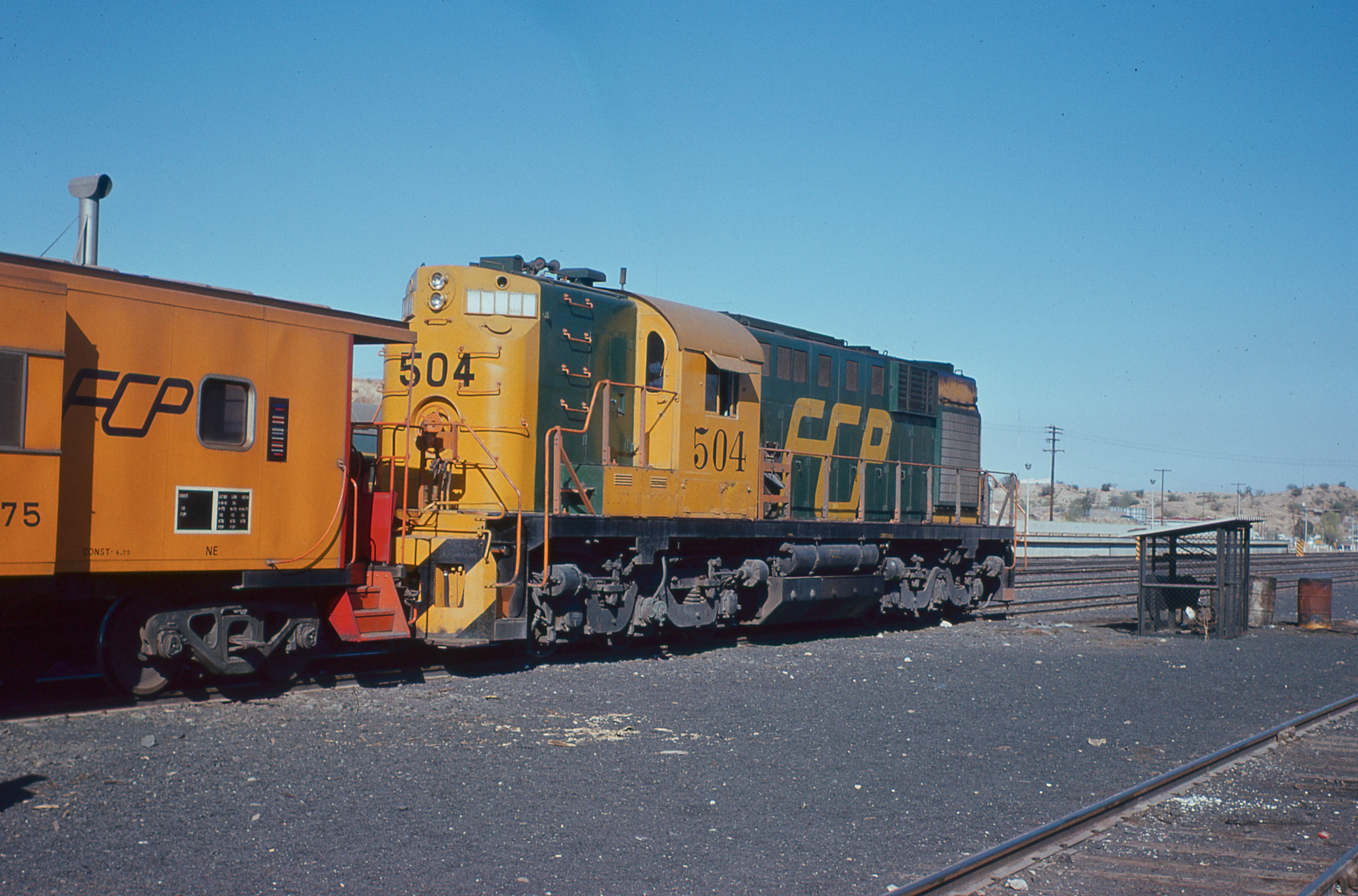
- Ferrocarril del Pacifico 504 in Nogales, Sonora, Mexico, in March 1979
Type and origin
- Power type: Diesel-electric
- Builder: American Locomotive Company; Montreal Locomotive Works
- Model: RSD-12
- Build date: April 1956 – March 1963
- Total produced: 171
Specifications
- Configuration
  - AAR: C-C
- Gauge: 4 ft 8 1/2 in (1,435 mm) standard gauge
- Prime mover: ALCO 12-251B
- Engine type: V12 Four-stroke diesel
- Aspiration: Turbocharged
- Cylinders: 12
Performance figures
- Maximum speed: 75 mph (121 km/h)
- Power output: 1,800 hp (1,300 kW)
- Tractive effort: 78,750 lb (35,720 kg)

The ALCO RSD-12 was a C-C diesel-electric locomotive rated at 1,800 horsepower (1.34 MW). 171 locomotives were produced. They were used in much the same manner as its four-axle counterpart, the ALCO RS-11, although the six-motor design allowed for better tractive effort at lower speeds.

== Original buyers ==
Image	Railroad	Quantity	Road numbers	Notes
	Chesapeake and Ohio Railway	10	6700–6709	Renumbered 2007–2016, 2014 and 2016 were sold to Baltimore and Ohio Railroad, then were purchased by Utah Railway on February 23, 1976.
	Lake Superior and Ishpeming Railroad	4	1801–1804	
	New York, Chicago and St. Louis Railroad (“Nickel Plate Road”)	9	325–333	to Norfolk and Western Railway 2325-2333 in 1964
	Pennsylvania Railroad	25	8655–8679	to Penn Central 6855–6879; then to Conrail 1101-1123 and rebuilt into Alco mt6. 14 went to Norfolk Southern and 9 to CSX 1006-1016 with two retired upon Conrail purchase. All retired in 2020. SEE: Winchester and Western 107 and 120, EX CR MT 4's are in Gore, Va. 107 has an ex IHB SW cab and controls added so it can operate its mother unit.
	Southern Pacific Company	21	7000–7020	Renumbered 2950–2970, rebuilt from RSD-5 locomotives with a new motor and carbody, retaining generators and bogeys
	Ferrocarril del Pacífico	19	1502–1508, 509–520	
	Ferrocarriles Nacionales de México	73	7400–7472	
	Companhia Siderúrgica Nacional (Brazil)	10	3501–3510	Built by MLW, 1,600 mm (5 ft 3 in); to RFFSA
	Total	171		

== Preservation ==
- Lake Superior & Ishpeming #1804 partially survives in a shipyard in Escanaba, Michigan. It has no prime mover.
- Nickel Plate Road #329 is preserved at the Mad River & NKP Railroad Museum in Bellevue, Ohio.
- Southern Pacific #2954 and #2958 are preserved at the Southern California Railroad Museum in Perris, California. Both units are undergoing cosmetic restoration, with the possibility of future operational restoration. Both of these units are rebuilt from RSD-5s.
- Southern Pacific #2962 is preserved as Paperton Junction Southern #7012 at the Arkansas Railroad Museum in Pine Bluff, Arkansas.

== Gallery ==
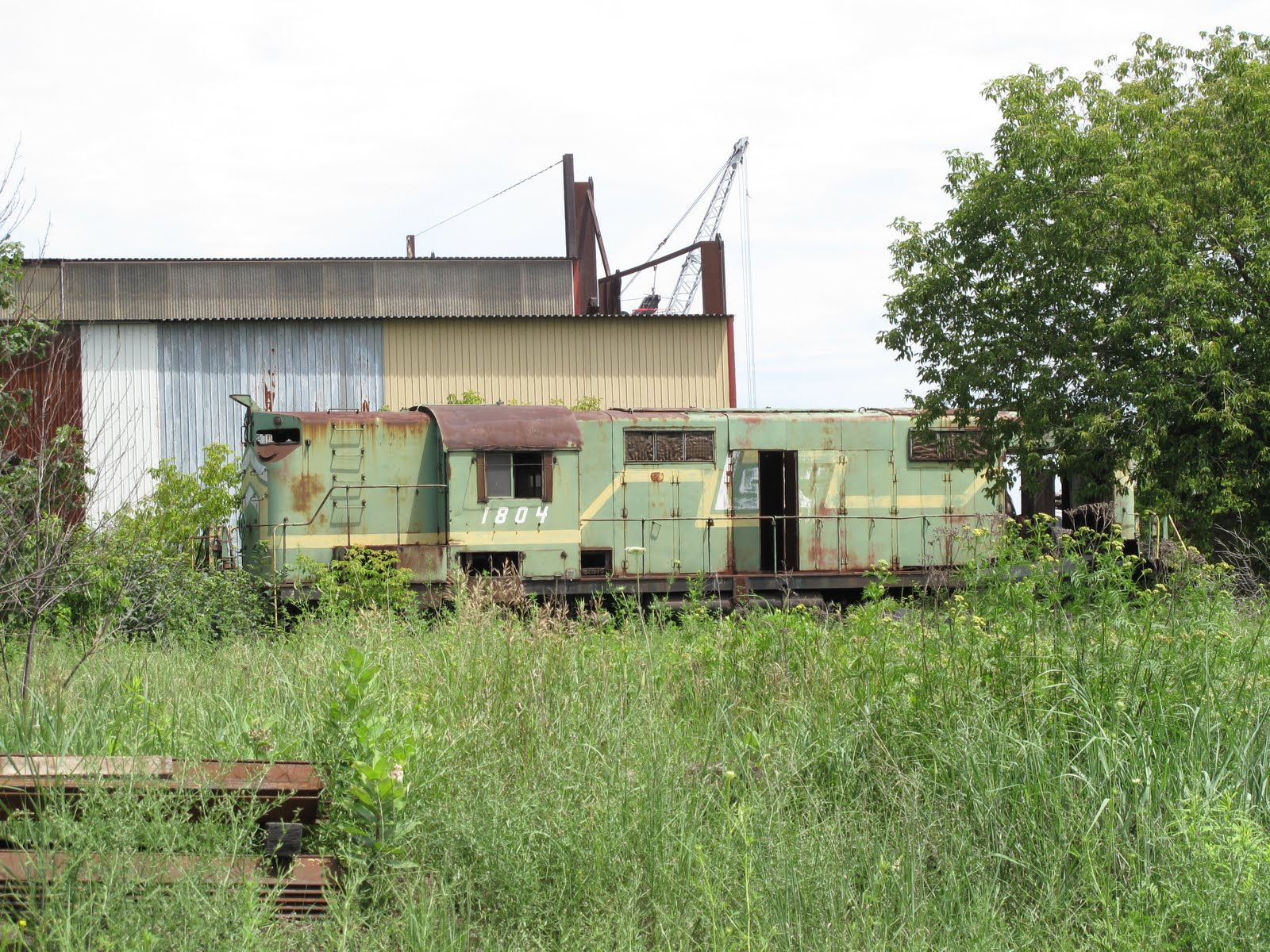
ALCO RSD-12 Lake Superior & Ishpeming RR No. 1804 resting in a shipyard in Escanaba Michigan in 2010.

== See also ==
- List of ALCO diesel locomotives
- List of MLW diesel locomotives
