= GE U23C =

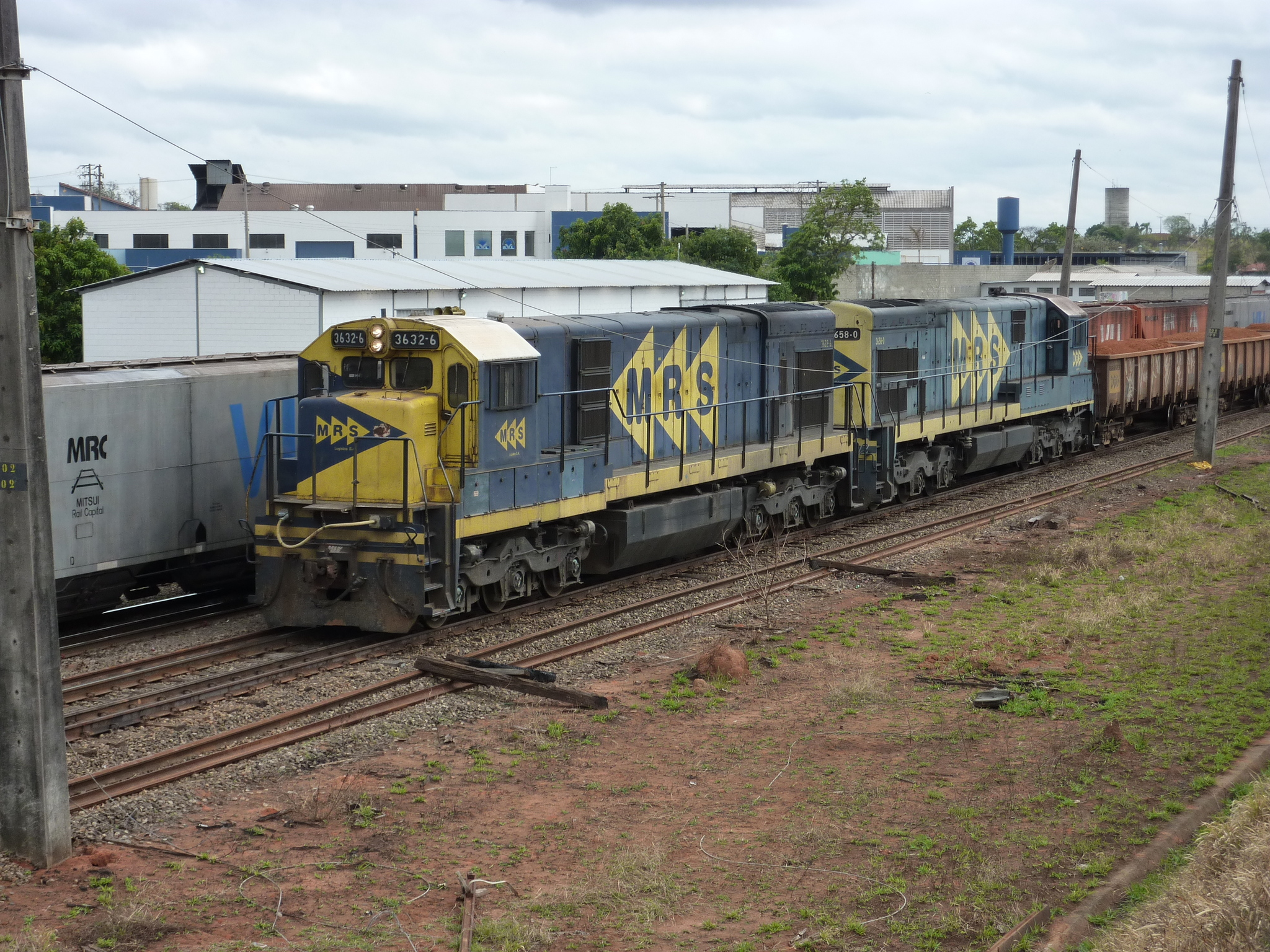
- MRS Logística No. 3632-6 at Itu, São Paulo in 2012
Type and origin
- Power type: Diesel-electric
- Builder: GE Transportation Systems; GE do Brasil
- Model: U23C
- Build date: March 1968 – 1976
- Total produced: 223
Specifications
- Configuration
  - AAR: C-C
- Gauge: 4 ft 8 1/2 in (1,435 mm) standard gauge 1,600 mm (5 ft 3 in), Brazil
- Prime mover: GE FDL-12
- Engine type: V12 diesel
- Cylinders: 12
Performance figures
- Maximum speed: 70 mph (113 km/h)
- Power output: 2,250 hp (1,680 kW)
- Tractive effort: 90,000 lb (41,000 kg)

The 2300 horsepower GE U23C diesel-electric locomotive model was first offered by GE in 1968, and featured a V-type 12 cylinder version of the standard GE FDL diesel motor. Designed as a competitor to EMD's SD38 and SD39 series, it was intended for heavy transfer, drag and hump service where speed was not a priority. Other than six tall hood doors matching six power assemblies per side, there are very few features which distinguish the U23C from the GE U30C.
