= FM H-20-44 =

Diesel-electric locomotive

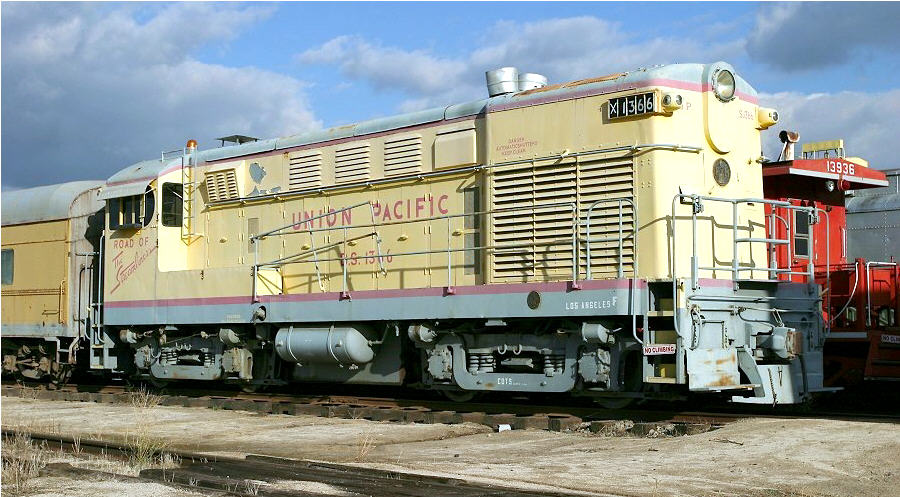
- An FM H-20-44 locomotive, retired Union Pacific #1366
Type and origin
- Power type: Diesel-electric
- Builder: Fairbanks-Morse
- Model: H-20-44
- Build date: June 1947 — March 1954
- Total produced: 96
Specifications
- Configuration
  - AAR: B-B
  - UIC: B′B′
- Gauge: 1,435 mm (4 ft 8 1/2 in)
- Length: 51 ft 0 in (15.54 m)
- Loco weight: 254,000 lb (115.2 tonnes)
- Prime mover: FM 38D-8 1/8
- Engine type: Two-stroke diesel
- Aspiration: Roots blower
- Displacement: 10,369 cu in (169,920 cm^{3})
- Cylinders: 10 (Opposed piston)
- Cylinder size: 8.125 in × 10 in (206 mm × 254 mm)
- Transmission: DC generator, DC traction motors
- Loco brake: Straight air
- Train brakes: Air
Performance figures
- Maximum speed: 70 mph (113 km/h)
- Power output: 2,000 hp (1.49 MW)
- Tractive effort: 42,125 lbf (187.38 kN)
Career
- Locale: North America
- Disposition: Two preserved, one former preserved unit scrapped in 2025, remainder scrapped

The FM H-20-44 was a diesel locomotive manufactured by Fairbanks-Morse from June 1947 – March 1954. It represented the company's first foray into the road switcher market. The 2,000 hp (1,490 kW), ten-cylinder opposed piston engine locomotive was referred to by F-M's engineering department as the "Heavy Duty" unit. It was configured in a B-B wheel arrangement mounted atop a pair of two-axle AAR Type-B road trucks with all axles powered. H-20-44s shared the same platform and much of the same carbody as the lighter-duty FM H-15-44, which began its production run three months later.

In the same manner as other F-M switcher models, the H-20-44 started out displaying a variety of Raymond Loewy-inspired contours, only to have the majority of these superfluous trim features stripped from the last few units built as a cost-cutting measure. Only 96 units were built for American railroads, as few firms saw sufficient value in moving freight in greater quantities or at a higher speeds than was possible with the typical 1,500 and 1,600 horsepower (1,200 kW) four-axle road switchers of the era. Also limiting the model's utility as a true road unit was its lack of a short hood, which the (ironically) lighter-duty H-15-44 did have. Two intact examples of the H-20-44 are known to survive today; all are preserved at railroad museums. These were former Southwest Portland Cement units donated in the early 1980s. Unfortunately, SWPC 410, or AC&Y 500, was scrapped in August 2025 at the Galveston Railroad Museum. It was rendered inoperable due to severe storm damage inflicted by Hurricane Ike in 2008. It was also the last Akron, Canton and Youngstown locomotive preserved.

A six axle version for better traction was catalogued, but no orders were placed, and no demos were built.

== Preservation ==
- Union Pacific #1366 (later Southwest Portland Cement #409) is preserved at the Illinois Railway Museum in Union, Illinois.
- Union Pacific #1369 (later Southwest Portland Cement #69) is preserved at the Pacific Southwest Railway Museum in Campo, California.
- A third unit, Akron, Canton and Youngstown Railroad #500 was preserved at the Galveston Railroad Museum in Galveston, Texas, who repainted it as a Union Pacific locomotive. It would unfortunately suffer severe damage from Hurricane Ike and was rendered inoperable afterwards, and in August 2025, the locomotive was scrapped on Museum Grounds.

== Units produced ==
Image	Railroad	Quantity	Road numbers	Notes
	Akron, Canton and Youngstown Railroad	6	500–505	500 sold to Southwest Portland Cement in the 1960s. Donated to the Galveston Railroad Museum in 1984 and repainted as "Union Pacific 410." "410" was scrapped in August 2025 due to storm damage.
	Fairbanks-Morse (demonstrator units)	1	2000	Serial number #L1032; sold to the UP later in 1947 and assigned #DS1366. Sold to Southwest Portland Cement in 1963 and renumbered 409. Donated to the Illinois Railway Museum in 1984. Still in SWPC paint.
	New York Central Railroad	19	7100–7118	
	Pennsylvania Railroad	38	8917–8942, 9300–9311	#8931 and #8939 to Penn Central #7731 and #7739 in 1968, retired August 1970
	Pittsburgh and West Virginia Railway	22	50–71	
	Union Pacific Railroad	10	DS1360–DS1365, DS1367–DS1370	DS 1369 sold to Southwest Portland Cement in 1962 and renumbered 69. Donated to the Pacific Southwest Railway Museum in 1984. Repainted back to UP colors in 1998.
		96		
