= FM H-15-44 =

- Denver and Rio Grande Western Railroad #151, an FM H-15-44 road-switcher, leads a westbound freight train out of Denver, Colorado in July 1952. One of the first units produced, it displays the Loewy design cues that were a signature feature of many early Fairbanks-Morse locomotives.
Type and origin
- Power type: Diesel-electric
- Builder: Fairbanks-Morse
- Model: H-15-44
- Build date: September 1947–June 1950
- Total produced: 35
Specifications
- Configuration
  - AAR: B-B
- Gauge: 4 ft 8 1/2 in (1,435 mm)
- Length: 51 ft 0 in (15.54 m)
- Loco weight: 250,000 lb (113.4 t)
- Prime mover: FM 38D-8 1/8
- Engine type: Two-stroke diesel
- Aspiration: Roots blower
- Displacement: 8,295 cu in (135.93 dm^{3})
- Cylinders: 8 (Opposed piston)
- Cylinder size: 8.125 in × 10 in (206 mm × 254 mm)
- Transmission: DC generator, DC traction motors
- Loco brake: Straight air
- Train brakes: Air
Performance figures
- Maximum speed: 65 mph (105 km/h)
- Power output: 1,500 hp (1.12 MW)
- Tractive effort: 42,125 lbf (187.4 kN)
Career
- Locale: North America
- Disposition: All scrapped

The FM H-15-44 was a diesel locomotive manufactured by Fairbanks-Morse from September 1947 to June 1950. The locomotive was powered by a 1,500-horsepower (1,100 kW), eight-cylinder opposed piston engine as its prime mover, and was configured in a B-B wheel arrangement mounted atop a pair of two-axle AAR Type-B road trucks with all axles powered. The H-15-44 featured an offset cab design that provided space for an optional steam generator in the short hood, making the model versatile enough to work in passenger service as well as freight duty.

Raymond Loewy heavily influenced the look of the unit, which emphasized sloping lines and accented such features as the radiator shutters and headlight mounting, as is found on CNJR #1501 and KCS #40. The cab-side window assembly incorporated "half moon"-shaped inoperable panes which resulted in an overall oblong shape. The platform (underframe) was shared with F-M's 2,000-horsepower (1,500 kW) end cab road switcher, the FM H-20-44, as was the carbody to some extent. The platform and carbody was also utilized by the H-15-44's successor, the FM H-16-44.

Only 35 units were built for American railroads and none exist today.

== Original buyers ==
Image	Railroad	Quantity	Road numbers	Notes
	Fairbanks-Morse (demonstrators)	2	1500	to Central Railroad of New Jersey 1500
	Fairbanks-Morse (demonstrators)	2	1503	Up-rated to 1,600 hp (1,200 kW) and sold Long Island Rail Road #1503
	Akron, Canton and Youngstown Railroad	1	200	
	Central of Georgia Railway	5	101–105	
	Central Railroad of New Jersey	13	1501–1513	
	Chicago, Indianapolis and Louisville Railway (“Monon”)	2	36–37	Renumbered 45–46
	Chicago, Rock Island and Pacific Railroad	2	400–401	Re-engined by Electro-Motive Division
	Denver and Rio Grande Western Railroad	3	150–152	
	Kansas City Southern Railway ("Louisiana and Arkansas Railway")	2	40–41	
	Union Pacific	5	DS1325–DS1329	Fitted with steam generator; DS prefix dropped in 1955
	Total	35		
